= Jeremy Scott (actor) =

American actor and model (1961–1994)

- Born: Troy Andrew Myers; 17 October 1961; San Diego, California, United States
- Died: 28 May 1994 (aged 32); Rockford, Illinois, United States
- Other name: Troy A. Myers
- Occupations: Actor; model; dancer
- Years active: 1976–1994
- Agent: Nova Films
- Partner: James Leon Larsen Jr. (1988–1994)

Troy Andrew Myers (October 17, 1961 – May 28, 1994), known professionally as Jeremy Scott, was an American adult film actor and model who appeared in gay adult films during the late 1970s, 1980s, and early 1990s. He is recognized by adult film historians as one of the early, defining figures of the "twink" archetype in gay adult cinema. Scott performed during a distinct transition era in adult media, prior to the widespread implementation of safe-sex practices and mandatory condom use in the industry. Over the course of his career, he appeared in approximately forty films and was featured in numerous physique and adult magazines.

== Early life and education ==
Troy Andrew Myers was born on October 17, 1961, in San Diego, California, and was raised in a Mormon household in the Los Angeles area. His father ran a hair salon in Costa Mesa, California. While attending high school, Myers was described by peers as a kind, optimistic, and stylish individual, often noted for wearing leather jackets and cowboy boots. He was sexually active from his early teens.

At the age of 16, Myers began working as a nude model for various art schools in Laguna Beach and throughout Orange County. By age 17, a photographer friend working for Blue Boy magazine convinced him to transition into professional physique photography. Shortly thereafter, Myers traveled to Los Angeles to shoot sessions for the photography studio Thomas of Hollywood. After graduating from high school, he relocated to New York City, where he worked as a nude dancer and performed in live stage sex acts.

== Career ==
While reviewing photo proofs from his Blue Boy sessions, Myers was approached by adult film filmmaker and cinematographer William Higgins, who had recently completed the films Boys of Venice and Married Men. In the summer of 1979, Myers accepted Higgins' offer to join Nova Films, a studio that produced content for distributors such as Catalina Video and Laguna Pacific. Adopting the stage name Jeremy Scott, he initially spent three years working in an administrative office role for the company before transitioning to on-camera performing.

Scott made his feature film debut in The Class of '84 Part 1, performing several solo scenes as well as the film's final sequence alongside performer Derrick Stanton. He achieved major industry prominence with the 1982 release of Pacific Coast Highway. Directed by Higgins, the film positioned Scott as the centerpiece of the studio's "all-American boy" aesthetic and established him as a major star within the genre. Contemporaries and friends from that era frequently compared his industry potential to that of established adult performer Kip Noll.

Scott went on to appear in roughly forty films throughout the 1980s and early 1990s, working primarily with Higgins and Nova Films. His notable film credits included Giants, The Size Counts, Foreplay, and The Boys of San Francisco. His final performances included roles in films such as Sleazy Dick Pigs, some of which were released posthumously.

== Personal life ==
Scott was involved in several high-profile personal relationships within the adult entertainment industry. He was in a romantic relationship with director William Higgins during the early part of his career, though the two later broke up. He was also romantically involved with filmmaker and singer Ian Ayers; following the end of their romance, the two remained close friends. Scott was in a committed relationship with his partner, James Leon Larsen Jr., which lasted until Scott's death.

Outside of his film and modeling career, Scott was an avid musician who enjoyed playing the guitar. He maintained close personal friendships with fellow adult industry performers of the era, including Kip Noll and J.W. King.

== Death ==
Scott was diagnosed with AIDS and began showing visible signs of illness around 1991. He died from complications of the disease on May 28, 1994, in Rockford, Illinois, at the age of 32. Following his death, his remains were cremated, and his ashes were scattered at a cemetery in Rockford.

== Filmography ==
=== Film ===
Year	Title	Role	Notes
1980	The Class of '84 Part1	Kit	Debut
1981	Pacific Coast Highway	Jeremy	
1981	Place of Pleasures	Student	
1981	Kip Noll Superstar	Sexy Guy	
1981	Kyd Stuff	Matt	
1981	The Class of '84 Part 2	Kip	
1981	The Boys of San Francisco	UCLA Student	
1982	Kip Noll Superstar: Part 1	Jeremy	
1983	Giants	Scott	
1983	Little Brother's Coming Out	Younger brother	
1983	Rock Creek Gang	Jerry	
1984	The Arousers	Trent's friend	
1984	Mind Games	Beautiful teenager	
1984	Juice	The Office Boy	
1984	Jock Empire	Jeremy Stone	
1984	Mind Games	Andy	
1985	Never Big Enough	Andrew	
1985	Move Over Johnny, Here Comes Big Dan	Jeremy	
1985	Making It Huge	Toby Reese	
1985	Men and Steel	Jeremy	
1985	L.A. Boiling Point	Handsome Boy	
1985	Shooting Stars 4: Jeremy Scott	Jeremy Scott	
1985	Two By Ten	Jamie	
1986	Foreplay	Restroom Guy	
1986	Bad Boys Dormitory	Jeremy	
1986	Hot Shots 3: The Contest	Luke	
1986	Hot Shots 4: The Contest Continues	Luke	
1986	P.S. Connection 2	Handsome Boy	
1986	Size Counts	Justin	
1987	Manholes 2	Jeremy	
1988	Hot Hung and Hard	Scott	
1988	Split Decision	Jeremy	
1988	Hard Line	Jeremy Scott	
1988	Black Force	Prisoner	
1988	Hot Shots 21: Big Ones	Teenager Boy	
1988	Stroke 26: Anywhere, Anytime	Jeremy	
1988	Workin' Hard For The Money	Jeremy Scott	
1989	Black & Blond: Probe Volume 4	Boy	
1989	More Raw Rears: Hot Shots 29	Brandon	
1989	Sex in the Great Outdoors 1	Scott	
1989	Jocks Home Video 7	Jock	
1989	Easy Access	Jeremy	
1989	Manco Video 25	Jeremy	
1990	Glory Hole of Fame 1	Jeremy	
1991	Best of Kip Noll	Jeremy	
1991	Lone Star	Will	
1991	Sex In The Great Outdoors	Scott	
1992	The Size Counts	Justin	
1994	Manco Video 32	Jeremy	Posthumous release
1995	Sleazy Dick Pigs	Troy	Posthumous release
2000	Men in Motion 5	Jerry	Posthumous release
2000	Men in Motion 6	Jerry	Posthumous release
2004	Old School Man Tools	Jeremy	Posthumous release
2005	Road Thrill	Eric	Posthumous release
2006	Butt Pirates	Milo	Posthumous release
2007	Acockalipto	Jeremy	Posthumous release
2012	Flip Flop Boys	Jeremy	Posthumous release
2025	Daddy Dearest & Juice	Jeremy	Posthumous release
