= Derrick Stanton =

American pornographic actor and model (born 1955)

- Born: 1955; Baltimore, Maryland, U.S.
- Other names: Derek Stanton; Mister Reliable; Derrick 'Megaload' Stanton; Elliot; Ted
- Occupations: Actor; Model; Activist; Advocater
- Years active: 1976 – present
- Agent: Jaguar Productions

Derrick Stanton (born 1955) is an American adult film actor, model and HIV/AIDS advocate. Active primarily from the late 1970s through the late 1990s, Stanton was a prolific figure during the "Golden Age" of gay cinema. Known by the nicknames "Mister Reliable" and "Derrick 'Megaload' Stanton", he was celebrated by directors for his professionalism, physical stamina, and longevity in an industry frequently disrupted by the AIDS epidemic.

== Early life ==
Stanton was born in 1955 in Baltimore, Maryland. In the mid-1970s, he lived a relatively quiet life, working the night shift as a custodian (janitor). In 1976, seeking to explore his sexuality and supplement his income, he was introduced by a friend to photographer Barry Knight, the founder of Jaguar Productions.

== Career ==
=== Early years and Jaguar Productions (1976–1979) ===
Stanton's debut came in the 1978 film Hard Hat. He was originally cast in a minor capacity, but when a lead performer became incapacitated on set, Stanton stepped in to fill the role. His enthusiastic performance and physical consistency immediately impressed Knight. During this era, Jaguar Productions was a pioneering but legally vulnerable company, often targeted by West Hollywood police for distributing gay content.

=== "Mister Reliable" and the Golden Age ===
Stanton became a staple of 1980s gay cinema, appearing in over 30 films. Directors, most notably William Higgins, frequently praised his work ethic. Higgins famously stated that Stanton was one of the "easiest people to work with," noting that if a camera crew missed a shot, Stanton was physically capable of performing again within ten minutes. While often cast in supporting roles, he was known for "stealing scenes" with his high energy. In the 1981 film Performance, he gained notoriety for a live-act stunt involving a large dildo. He appeared in Hard Hat (1978), The Boys of Venice (1978) the film is credited with bringing him significant public notice, Brothers Should Do It (1981) starring alongside Jon King, whom Stanton cited as the co-star he was most attracted to, Route 69 (1984), Strange Places... Strange Things! (1984), and Family Values (1997).

=== Professional relationships ===
Stanton worked alongside the era's biggest icons, including Casey Donovan and Al Parker. He famously recalled serving as a "go-to fluffer" for Parker, assisting the superstar when he struggled with the pressures of being on camera. He cited J.W. King as his favorite co-star, describing him as the "most fun to work with".

=== Later years ===
Stanton resides in Los Angeles. In 2025, he experienced a resurgence in public interest following an interview with filmmaker Matt Cullen for the series Our Queer Life. He is active on social media, particularly Reddit, where he provides historical context on vintage gay cinema and shares anecdotes from his career.

== Personal life ==
=== The AIDS Crisis and Caregiving ===
The arrival of the AIDS crisis in the early 1980s brought the industry to a "screeching halt". Stanton witnessed many friends and colleagues pass away and eventually tested positive for HIV himself. In 1991, he met his long-term partner, Quan, at the Los Angeles bar Faces. The two remained together for 23 years. As Quan developed AIDS-related dementia, Stanton became his full-time caregiver until Quan's death in 2014. Immediately following this, Stanton provided end-of-life care for his mother, who suffered from Alzheimer's disease.

== Filmography ==
=== Film ===
| Year | Title | Role | Notes |
|---|---|---|---|
| 1977 | Men Under the Hardhat (aka Hardhat) | Derek | Debut |
| 1979 | The Grease Monkeys | Blazer | |
| 1979 | Bad, Bad Boys (aka Bad Boys) | Billy | |
| 1979 | Jocks | Jock | Featured Jack Wrangler |
| 1979 | The Boys of Venice | Will | |
| 1979 | L.A. Tool & Die | The Stranger | |
| 1979 | The Idol | Shower Boy | |
| 1980 | The Class of '84, Part 1 | Bob | |
| 1980 | Wet Shorts | Derek Stanton | |
| 1980 | Rear Deliveries | Ted | Directed by William Higgins |
| 1981 | Brothers Should Do It | Jamie | With Jon King |
| 1981 | Performance | Derrick | Features dildo live-act stunt |
| 1981 | Kip Noll, Superstar 1 | Derrick Stanton | |
| 1981 | The Class of '84, Part 2 | Bob | |
| 1981 | Tricking | Derek Stanton | |
| 1981 | Face to Face | Derek Stanton | |
| 1982 | Ah Men | Ted | |
| 1982 | Members Only | Derek | |
| 1982 | Printer's Devils | Muse | |
| 1983 | Class Reunion, William Higgins' | Bob | |
| 1983 | These Bases Are Loaded 1 | Tony | |
| 1984 | Xtra Large | Bill | |
| 1984 | Route 69 | Steven | |
| 1985 | Strange Places... Strange Things! | Jack | |
| 1987 | Deep Fantasies: Stroke 5 | Derek Stanton | |
| 1987 | Strokers | Derek | |
| 1988 | The Best of the Biggest: Stroke 6 | Derrick Stanton | |
| 1989 | Manco Video 27 | Elliott | |
| 1989 | Sex in the Great Outdoors 1 | Thomas | |
| 1990 | The Best of Stud 1 | Sam | |
| 1990 | Glory Hole of Fame 1 | Derek | |
| 1990 | The Best of Jon King | Derrick Stanton | |
| 1990 | Catalina Orgies 1 | Scott | |
| 1990 | Love a Man with a Mustache 2 | Benny | |
| 1991 | The Best of Kip Noll | Derek Stanton | |
| 1994 | Sausage Suckers | Tommy | |
| 1995 | Tommy Boy | Derek Stanton | |
| 1997 | Family Values | Phil Sampson | Award-winning performance |
| 1997 | Hard Core | Derrick Stanton | |
| 1998 | William Higgins 2: Director's Best | Derrick Stanton | |
| 2000 | A Young Man's World | Derek | |
| 2002 | Young Men of the 80's 4 | Derek | |
| 2003 | Wild Young Fuckers | James | |
| 2006 | The Class of '84, Part 2: Hard Lessons | Bob | |
| 2014 | Cruisin | Derrick Stanton | |
| 2016 | Dangerous Sex in Public Places 1 | Derrick Stanton | |

== Awards and Honors ==
| Year | Award | Category | Work | Result | Ref |
|---|---|---|---|---|---|
| 1995 | Gay Erotic Video Awards (GayVN) | Hall of Fame | Contribution to Porn Cinema | Won | |
| 1998 | Men in Video Awards (MIVA) | Best Jack-off | Family Values | Won | |
| 1998 | Men in Video Awards (MIVA) | Best Actor | Family Values | Nominated | |

== Legacy ==
In 1995, he was induction into the Gay Erotic Video Awards Hall of Fame (now known as the GayVN Hall of Fame) solidified his place among the legends of the "Golden Age," recognizing his contributions across more than 30 films.
