= Fred Halsted =

American film director (1941–1989)

- Born: Fred Charles Halsted; July 17, 1941; Long Beach, California, U.S.
- Died: May 9, 1989 (aged 47); Dana Point, California, U.S.
- Occupations: Gay pornographic film director, actor, escort, publisher, sex club owner

Fred Charles Halsted (July 20, 1941 – May 9, 1989) was an American gay pornographic film director, actor, escort, publisher, and sex club owner. His films Sex Garage and L.A. Plays Itself are the only gay pornographic movies in the permanent collection of the Museum of Modern Art, where they were screened before a capacity audience on April 23, 1974. A screening of L.A. Plays Itself was sponsored by the San Francisco Museum of Modern Art on February 28, 2013, and another took place on December 16, 2011, at the Los Angeles art gallery Human Resources. His films have also been shown the Netherlands Film Museum and in competition at The Deauville Film Festival.

"Halsted more or less created the world of gay sexual art and experimentation. He then watched it, and himself, be destroyed by AIDS, a sanitizing of gay sexual tastes and the power of addiction."

Halsted was a sex radical. He believed that the erotic is transgressive and sacramental, that it is inherently violent and involves acts of violation. "Sex is not 'coming,' that is superficial sex," he once explained. "Mine is personal cinema. I don't fuck to get my rocks off. In the best scenes I've ever had, I haven't come. I am not interesting in coming. … I am interested in getting my head off, my emotions off."

== Early life and career ==
Halsted was born in Long Beach, California, in 1941. His father, Milton William Halsted, worked in construction, and his mother, Lillian Halsted (née Samoyloff), was a Doukhobor and did agricultural work. Milton abandoned the family when Fred was three. His mother was remarried to John Knight, who raped Fred when he was 8, which he described as "a turning point in his sexual identity." He attended high school in Bakersfield, California, and San Jose, California, and he described himself as a student politician, which led to his failing all his classes. Halsted studied botany at Cal State LA, and subsequently worked as a gardener and was in the nursery plant business; he owned a wholesale nursery in El Monte, California. He later said he looked back on his years as a gardener as the happiest days of his life. He never held a regular job nor had a Social Security number. His long-term lover (though with interruptions) was Joseph Yanoska, who appears in his movies under the name "Joe Yale"; they were called "sadomasochism's heaviest couple". Halsted wrote autobiographical pieces about his promiscuous gay sex life.

Halsted was a good friend of Kenneth Anger, and he loved Scorpio Rising. He said that "I consider myself a pervert first and a homosexual second." Also, he considered "sadism... more basic to my personality than homosexuality".

== L.A. Plays Itself (1972) ==
The movie begins with a shot of a sign at the city limits of Los Angeles, giving its population at the time (2,535,700). An overheard conversation contains the words "Los Angeles stinks." Mists over the canyons of Malibu are seen. A hiker, taking a walk in the forest, sees a naked blond, who offers to give him head. Their sexual encounter is interrupted by shots of approaching bulldozers. (Halsted was concerned about development destroying the wild areas of the Santa Monica Mountains.) In the second part of the movie, an older man (Halsted) tortures a young innocent (Halsted's lover Joseph Yale). A voiceover states that the youth is a cowboy hustler just arrived from Texas. The youth is bound, beaten, and kicked. At the climax, he is fisted, with a closeup of a can of Crisco, usual lubricant for fisting at that time. (Yale refused to be fisted and a double was used.)

According to Halsted, this was the first time fisting was shown on screen. At the end, he is bound and left helpless in a closet. The action is not one continuous scene; it is punctuated by Halsted driving through Griffith Park, a gay cruising spot also featured in John Rechy's City of Night. In the park unidentified men appear, the camera focusing on their dirty pants, especially crotches ("baskets," in gay slang) and asses. There are also interspersed newspaper headlines about weird cults and the Manson murders, ads pushing "101 varieties of meat", shots of hustlers, bums, vagrants, porn theaters. The film ends on shots of newspapers saying that a young man was found dead after being tortured.

According to the film's cinematographer "Tom", there was no screenplay. Random footage was shot, which Halsted was capable of sorting out and putting in a sequence. Halsted described it thus: "It was okay to be openly gay, but to get into S&M was another trip. One of the purposes of L.A. Plays Itself was to get S&M and allied perversions out on the screen where people could look at them, think about them, analyze them, let it affect them, whatever they wanted, but not have it hidden anymore, and leave it open where people can deal with it easily." He has been quoted as saying that the film was highly autobiographical.

L.A. Plays Itself was a huge sensation when it opened in New York. The movie was praised by Fernando Arrabal, William Burroughs, and Al Goldstein, but was misunderstood by most homosexuals and film critics. After seeing it, Burroughs sought out Halsted to discuss a collaboration (Terry Southern was also involved) to film Burroughs' The Wild Boys as a hard-core porn film. The project was abandoned as financially unviable.

A 2003 documentary, Los Angeles Plays Itself, takes its title from Halsted's movie.

The film was restored by the Museum of Modern Art (MoMA) in 2020 and released on DVD, Blu-ray, and VOD by Altered Innocence on December 28, 2021

== Sex Garage (1972) ==
Sex Garage was a 35-minute black-and-white short. It was produced after L.A. Plays Itself was completed, but before its release; it was intended to accompany the longer movie. It takes place in an auto repair facility (garage). As it begins a woman takes her car to the garage for service, and performs fellatio on her long-haired mechanic boyfriend. A male arrives with a car for service, scaring off the woman, who has just reached her climax. He starts servicing the mechanic, and is forced to put on the woman's discarded panties. A long-haired, bearded biker arrives, wearing a dirty jockstrap. He fucks the man wearing the panties; the mechanic thrusts his head into a toilet. The biker ejaculates onto the motorcycle seat. Bach's Jesu, Joy of Man's Desiring, performed on a piano, is background music, as is "When Tomorrow Comes" by The Emotions. There are many atmosphere shots of vehicles, of the Hollywood Freeway, and of billboards on Sunset Strip.

The film was restored by the Museum of Modern Art (MoMA) in 2020 and released on DVD, Blu-ray, and VOD by Altered Innocence on December 28, 2021

== Erotikus: A History of the Gay Movie (1974) ==
Erotikus is a history of the gay pornographic movie, directed by Tom DeSimone. It is narrated by Halsted, seated in a director's chair, at first fully clothed, then naked, then masturbating. A double was used in the latter part, not out of modesty but to have a bigger penis and a more impressive ejaculation. He reaches a climax during a montage of cum shots set to Ravel's Boléro. According to the box cover of the Bijou Video release, Halsted, "dick in hand, narrates this survey of gay pornography, starting with the Apollo Physique magazines, which eventually evolved into 8mm loops and eventually into hard-core full-length movies." It contains excerpts from Boys in the Sand, Dust unto Dust, L.A. Plays Itself, Confessions of a Male Groupie, Tarzan the Fearless, Classified Capers, The Collection, Assault, One (the first orgasm shown in a gay movie), and Yes (1969, the first explicit sex shown in theatres). The climactic fisting scene from L.A. Plays Itself was first included but deleted in later versions.

Halsted never forgave DeSimone for reducing his compensation because a "double penis" had been used. Also, DeSimone reused the shot of the Los Angeles Times headline "New Weird Cult, Link to Tate Murder" from L.A. Plays Itself but suggests, as L.A. Plays Itself did not, that there was a link between gay BDSM and the Manson murders. This was offensive to Halsted, who denounced the film in conversation and in print.

According to Al Goldstein, publisher of the pornographic tabloid Screw, "frame for frame, it contains more sex than any gay film ever released".

== Sextool (1975) ==
Halsted's next feature, Sextool, was intended to be a crossover success. Like L.A. Plays Itself and Sex Garage, it was produced, written, directed, edited, photographed, and starred in by Halsted. It is centered around a party where a relatively innocent-married young man discovers the diverse sex practices of a dozen people. Sextool explores a fantasy Los Angeles populated by policemen, boxers, leathermen, a sailor, and one questionably straight man squiring his American transgender paramour. Whites are chauffeurs for the blacks, and two cops rape someone in the police station. The topic of the movie, according to Halsted, was "sexual politics." It has been described as an "art work" and not immediately appealing to those who watch gay porn for sexual purposes.

Halsted chose to use 35 mm film, hoping the movie would get shown in art houses, but the film only puzzled or offended the theater managers. Few of the theaters that did show gay pornographic movies had 35mm projectors. As a result, the film received very limited distribution. The use of the more expensive film meant Halsted was not able to shoot much transitional material, leading to a choppy effect.

The Museum of Modern Art, as a result of the success of the showing of L.A. Plays Itself and Sex Garage, acquired a copy of Sextool for its collection.

The film was restored by the Museum of Modern of Art (MoMA) in 2020 and released on DVD, Blu-ray, and VOD by Altered Innocence on December 28, 2021.

== Package (magazine) ==
In 1976 and 1977 Halsted edited and published a magazine, Package, "A Journal of Men, Fact & Opinion," according to its cover, containing sex news, contact ads, and stories of Halsted's erotic life. It is known to have published six issues.

== El Paso Wrecking Corp. (1977) ==
Halsted had an important role in El Paso Wrecking Corp., the second of the Working Man Trilogy directed by Joe Gage. After some drinking triggers a fight, Gene (played by Halsted) and Hank are fired from their job at the Kansas City Trucking Co.. Determined to land some other kind of blue-collar work, the two gay men begin looking and drive to El Paso but are often distracted by sex and water sports with the men they meet on their job search. Some of the scenes of the original movie are missing in recent video releases.

"When El Paso Wrecking Corp. first opened it caused big shock waves all across gay America, but since then it's picked up as easily as fashion, wear your jackets and chains. It's macho-ed up gay America which I think is a good thing."

== Straight play and movie ==
Halsted played a hustler in the play News for Tennessee by Joseph S. Caruso, produced at the Pilot Theater in Los Angeles in 1978. His lover Joseph Yanoska also had a part. Halsted had a cameo role in the 1979 movie Dribble (later released as Scoring).

== Halsted's (sex club) ==
Halsted's, located at 2453 Glendale Blvd., Silver Lake, Los Angeles, California, was, as he himself described it, a naked industrial space transformed into "a stand-up fuck club". Founded by Halsted, his lover Joseph Yale, and David Webb, the club had booths with glory holes, bunk beds, and a sling. Its most distinguishing characteristic was four truck trailers that were parked in the back inside a walled yard. (At the time, empty truck trailers were a popular venue for gay sex in the meatpacking district of New York City.) The club only lasted about a year; Halsted admitted that "Los Angeles did not have enough perverts" to support the club. Before it closed, he filmed there A Night at Halsted's.

== A Night at Halsted's (1982) ==
A Night at Halsted's does not have a plot; it consists of a series of sex scenes at the club of the same name, preceded by a brief introduction and followed by a similarly brief conclusion. Except for these two parts, the sound of the movie is all in voiceover.

The box cover of the movie states: "Only Fred Halsted could create a fantasyland where anything and everything goes, a place where you can meet the video stars of your dreams - and make them cum true! Glory holes, mirrors, slings, and other toys become a living playground for this orgy of tight, glistening flesh. Fred Halsted's crowning achievement."

== Later years ==
Halsted was never to make another hit movie. "By the late 1970s, Fred was falling apart". He used drugs and drank. His lover, Joseph Yanoska, died of AIDS in 1986, after having said to Fred "You did this to me." Fred was despondent after Joseph's death. He briefly advertised his services as an escort. He died in 1989 of an intentional overdose of sleeping pills. His suicide note said: "I had a good life... I've had looks, a body, money, success and artistic triumphs. I've had the love of my life. I see no reason to go on."

== Partial filmography ==
According to the Internet Adult Film Database and the Gay Erotic Video Index, Halsted appeared in the following movies:

- L.A. Plays Itself (1972)
- Erotikus: A History of the Gay Movie (1975)
- El Paso Wrecking Corp. (1977)
- Army of Lovers, or Revenge of the Perverts (1979) (documentary)
- Three Day Pass (1979)
- Pieces Of Eight (1980)
- A Night At Halsted's (1982)
- Nighthawk In Leather (1982)
- Fast Friends (1987)

and he directed the following films:

- Sex Garage (1972)
- Truck It (1973)
- Earth Man (1979)
- California Fox 1979
- Mustang (1979)
- Centurian (1980)
- Breaker Blue (1988)

He also appeared in the following compilations:

- Filth and the Fury (1990)
- Sack Wranglers (2005)
- Patriot Ass (2005)
- Queerfest (2006)

Fred's company Cosco distributed (and in most cases produced) twenty-four gay pornographic films between 1973 and 1985, such as Coverboy and Rick Donovan Is... King Size (both in 1984 and directed by Joseph Yale), and many shorts.
