= Richard Holt Locke =

American pornographic actor (1941-1996)

- Born: June 11, 1941; East Oakland, California
- Died: September 25, 1996 (aged 55); Sacramento, California
- Other name: Ty Winslow
- Occupation: pornographic film actor
- Years active: 1975–1983
- Height: 6 ft 2 in (188 cm)
- Family: Robert H. Locke

Richard Holt Locke (June 11, 1941 – September 25, 1996) was an American actor in gay erotic films of the 1970s and 1980s, who went on to become an AIDS educator and activist. As a performer in adult cinema, Locke has been credited with being one of the "earliest and most widely emulated VCR stars" in gay erotic cinema, as well as someone whose performance and physicality contributed to the evolution of gay sexual behavior in the 1970s and 1980s.

== Early life ==
Born on June 11, 1941, in East Oakland, California, Locke graduated from Pleasant Hill High School at eighteen, and spent the next three years in the army stationed in Germany as a tank mechanic. Returning to California, he earned a degree at California State University, Chico, majoring in History and Film.

Locke was open about his homosexuality with his family, to which he had close ties. His brother, Robert H. Locke, was also gay and wrote and gave interviews about his life with his brother Richard. Both parents were ultimately supportive of their sons' homosexuality, with their mother encouraging both to "be who [they] wanted to be."

== Career ==
One of Locke's first roles in adult film was Passing Strangers for the director Arthur Bressan in 1974, and that same year he was featured in Dreamer for the adult film director Jim West. He went on to have a prolific career in erotic cinema, particularly after his recurring lead role as "Hank" in Joe Gage's landmark "Working Man Trilogy" of films: Kansas City Trucking Co. (1976), El Paso Wrecking Corp. (1978), and L.A. Tool & Die (1979). His last adult film performance was in 1988, and in 1994, he was inducted into the Hall of Fame at the Gay Erotic Video Awards in Los Angeles. He returned to the screen in 1995 to play a non-sexual role in Jerry Douglas' The Diamond Stud, which was his last appearance in erotic film.

In a December 1992 interview for Manshots, recalling how he was asked to pick a screen pseudonym for billing, Locke said, "They asked me, 'What name do you want?, 'and I said, ‘My name.‘ I'm very proud of my work and everything I do. An artist signs his name to the canvas, and I sign my name."

Locke's age, musculature, dark hair, and hirsute frame have been credited with contributing to the popularity of "macho gay male" imagery in gay adult cinema and culture of the 1980s and 1990s. He is also regarded as having been an integral part of a highly developed star system in gay adult films, with a filmography and physique that helped define the parameters of gay adult film.

== Later life and death ==
Diagnosed HIV positive in 1983, Locke retired from adult cinema and became an HIV/AIDS activist. He received education from the American Red Cross, the Gay Men's Health Crisis in New York City, and Michael Callen and Richard Berkowitz's How to Have Sex in an Epidemic, one of the first safe sex materials developed for the gay community in the HIV/AIDS epidemic. While in New York, he also volunteered at the newly opened Bailey House, then known as the AIDS Resource Center. He used his name and celebrity to make personal appearances at "sensible sex" seminars around the country, advocating for safer sex practices in places like San Francisco, Los Angeles, Palm Springs, and New York. As one of the reasons for starting his "sensible sex" seminars and performances, he stated that "everybody loves a daddy, so if I can serve in that capacity to transmit information about good, clean, healthy sex, then I am more than happy to play that role."

Also around 1983, Locke became a regular visitor to Ward 5B, the first inpatient AIDS ward in the country, in San Francisco General Hospital. He entertained patients, served brunch, and gave massages to people with AIDS. This holistic therapeutic model towards HIV positive patients, put into use by practitioners and entertainers such as Locke, Rita Rockett, and Annie Sprinkle, was known as the San Francisco model of AIDS care. Locke, along with his care work for HIV positive patients, can be seen in clips from the documentary film 5B (Dan Krauss and Paul Haggis, 2018). As part of his care work, would routinely travel to Mexico for HIV drugs and distribute them in an underground clinic in Sacramento.

Along with this work, Locke was a frequent collaborator for the Bay Area Reporter, giving numbers of interviews and writing safe sex columns. He eventually collected his writing into an edited volume, In the Heat of Passion: How to have hotter, safer sex (1987), which was published with Leyland Press in San Francisco. He was working on two unfinished autobiographies, Living and Dying, and his one-act play, Loving, was filmed in 1995 in Toronto but was never released.

Eventually, Locke moved back to Desert Hot Springs near Palm Springs, California, after some years of traveling with his seminars and performances. In 1975, he had settled on an old soldier settlement property and built a geodesic domed home, powered by electricity from his own windmill. A proponent of what he called the "healing comfort" of geodesic domes and desert living, Locke had performed in Take One (1977), a docu-pornography by adult filmmaker Wakefield Poole, in which he excitedly described his life in the desert with his partner. He also did volunteer work from the Desert AIDS Project and gave weekly messages at the Villa Caprice Hotel in nearby Cathedral City.

When his health began failing in February 1996, he moved to an apartment in Sacramento to be close to his family and the medical facilities at UC Davis Medical Center. He died of AIDS complications on September 25, 1996, at UC Davis Medical Center near Sacramento, California. Services were held on September 29, 1996, in Sacramento, with interment at Benicia Cemetery outside Oakland.

== Filmography ==
- Dreamer (1974)
- Passing Strangers (1974)
- Pool Party (1975)
- The Sins of Johnny X (1975)
- Forbidden Letters (1976)
- Kansas City Trucking Co. (1976)
- Gemini (1977)
- Take One (1977)
- Two Days in a Hot Place (1977)
- El Paso Wrecking Corp. (1978)
- L.A. Tool and Die (1979)
- Best Of The Superstars (1981)
- Cruisin' the Castro (1981)
- Heatstroke (1982)
- Daddy Dearest (1984)
- Video Sin (1988)
- The Diamond Stud (1995)

== Awards ==
- 1994 Gay Erotic Video Awards Hall of Fame

== See also ==
- List of male performers in gay porn films
- Adult Erotic Gay Video Awards
- Gay Erotic Video Awards
