= Mike Henson =

Mike Henson may refer to:

- Mike Henson (snooker player)
- Mike Henson (actor)
