= L.A. Tool & Die =

1979 film by Tim Kincaid

- Promotional theatrical poster
- Directed by: Tim Kincaid (as Joe Gage)
- Written by: Tim Kincaid (as Joe Gage)
- Produced by: Sam Gage
- Starring: Richard Locke; Michael Kearns; Will Seagers; Paul Barresi (as Paul Baressi)
- Edited by: D.J. Davis
- Music by: Al Steinman
- Release date: 1979
- Running time: 88 min.
- Country: United States
- Language: English

L.A. Tool & Die is a 1979 American gay pornographic film directed by Tim Kincaid, credited as Joe Gage. It is the concluding film in Gage's "Working Man Trilogy", the first two being 1976's Kansas City Trucking Co. and 1978's El Paso Wrecking Corp.. It stars Richard Locke and features Will Seagers and Paul Barresi in a heterosexual scene with Becky Savage.

John Burger, the author of One-Handed Histories: The Eroto-Politics of Gay Male Video Pornography, describes the film as "the story of an unrequited love, in which Richard Locke follows the man of his dreams across the country. They eventually live happily ever after." Burger adds that this film came at the very end of the pre-AIDS filmmaking, when "all levels of erotic experience were faithfully documented by the porn industry... men could be whores, men could be monogamous or men could cruise the spectrum in between."

== Reception ==
L.A. Tool & Die was called "the best gay porn picture made to date" by Blueboy magazine.

== Cast ==
- Richard Locke as Hank
- Michael Kearns as Jim
- Joseph Kearns as Vic
- Richard Youngblood as Harry
- Will Seagers as Wylie
- Joe Walsh as Barry
- Calvin Culver as Fred (as Casey Donovan)
- Terri Dolan as Raven (as Terri Hannon)
- Derrick Stanton as The Stranger
- Shawn Victors as The Backpacker
- Paul Barresi as Sal (as Paul Baressi)
- Becky Savage as Elaine (as Becky Bitter)
- Johnny Falconberg as Pete
- Dan Pace as Coach
- Scott Sinclair as Mr. Carson
- Greg Dale as Windstorm Man (as Gregg Dale)
- Bob Damon as Windstorm Man
- Roy Harwood as Windstorm Man
- Bob Blount as Tank
- Chuck Cord as Gabe
- Matthew Forde as Jack
- Steve Rideout as Marine
- Reverend Spoonball as On the Radio (voice)
- Schutzen as Wylie's Dog
- Carlos Balajo
- Beau Lovejoy
- Tim Kincaid (as Joe Gage)
- Max Osterhaut
- Jose Solica
- Paul Guild
- Nels Stensgaard

== DVD release ==
The films comprising the "Working Man Trilogy" were restored and released on DVD by HIS Video.
