= Gay Male Pornography =

2004 book by Christopher N. Kendall

Gay Male Pornography: An Issue of Sex Discrimination
- Front cover art for the book Gay Male Pornography: An Issue of Sex Discrimination
- Author: Christopher N. Kendall
- Language: English
- Subjects: Gay pornography; opposition to pornography
- Publisher: University of British Columbia Press
- Publication date: 2004
- Publication place: Canada
- Media type: Print
- Pages: 270
- ISBN: 978-0-7748-1076-0

Gay Male Pornography: An Issue of Sex Discrimination is a 2004 book by the anti-pornography pro-feminist author Christopher N. Kendall.

== Background ==
The 2000 Little Sisters Book and Art Emporium v. Canada case in Canada was the first test of whether R. v. Butler applies to gay male and lesbian pornography. The court held that gay and lesbian pornography does constitute sex discrimination.

== Thesis ==
Christopher N. Kendall supports the conclusions of the Supreme Court of Canada in the Little Sisters Book and Art Emporium v. Canada decision. Supporting the case, Kendall argues that gay male pornography reinforces social attitudes that help create systemic inequality on the basis of sex and sexual orientation. He rejects the arguments of pro-pornography advocates, instead claiming that gay male pornography reinforces misogyny and homophobia. Because of this, Kendall believes that gay male pornography should be banned under Canada's anti-pornography laws.

== Reviews ==
William D. Araiza, writing for the Journal of the History of Sexuality, states that while the book makes a powerful argument, Kendall nonetheless "overstates his case. In particular, he undervalues, in my view, the role gay pornography can play in subverting ideas of male dominance and of socially constructed maleness in general."

Michelle Evans states,

There is no doubt that this book will rate as one of the most important texts on gay male pornography this century. This book is also critically important for victims of incest and sexual assault whose voices are consistently berated and silenced by those who enjoy pornography and who benefit financially from the pornography industry. It offers hope for all persons concerned about inequality and discrimination and paves a much needed path for a greater commitment by gay men to the feminist struggle against sexism and homophobia.

== See also ==
- Awol Marines, a reality-based, military-themed, gay pornographic website
