= Jon King (actor) =

American actor and model (1963–1995)

- Born: John Nelson Gaines; January 12, 1963; Jacksonville, Florida, U.S.
- Died: March 8, 1995 (aged 32); Santa Fe, New Mexico, U.S.
- Other names: John King; Nelson Gaines
- Occupations: Actor; model
- Years active: 1980–1995
- Agent: Falcon Studios

Jon King (born John Nelson Gaines; January 12, 1963 – March 8, 1995) was an American adult film actor and model, renowned as a prominent figure in gay adult cinema during the 1980s and early 1990s for his athletic build and "boy-next-door" appeal.

== Early life ==
He was born in Jacksonville, Florida, to Thomas and Katherine Gaines, Gaines moved to Los Angeles in 1980 at age 17 after an early teenage interest in the adult film industry.

== Career ==
=== Rise to prominence and legal hiatus (1981–1982) ===
He was discovered in Los Angeles, Gaines made his debut in William Higgins's Brothers Should Do It (1981). Marketed under the stage name Jon King due to his resemblance to performer J.W. King, he became a staple in Higgins' works while working side jobs like waitering. His career paused in 1982 following criminal charges and an 11-month prison sentence in Florida, which he later viewed as a major turning point.

=== Stardom, modeling, and retirement (1983–1995) ===
He returned to Los Angeles in 1983, King achieved peak stardom working with studios like Falcon Studios and directors like Kristen Bjorn. Notable films included Screen Play (1984) and Perfect Summer (1988). He was also a ubiquitous print model in adult lifestyle magazines. He later retired from full-time adult films in 1989 to train as a chef in Atlanta, though he returned for brief projects in the early 1990s, with posthumous releases extending into 1995.

== Personal life ==
Gaines maintained a highly private personal life despite his public profile. In interviews, he occasionally expressed discomfort with the scale of his adult industry fame, noting a strong preference for being recognized for his true character rather than his "Jon King" screen persona. He maintained a long-standing friendship with fellow adult film actor Shawn Mayotte.

== Death ==
After being diagnosed HIV-positive and experiencing declining health, he moved to Santa Fe, New Mexico. He died there from AIDS-related complications on March 8, 1995, at age 32. Per his wishes, his remains were cremated, mixed with his dog's ashes, and scattered in the Atlantic Ocean.

== Filmography ==
=== Film ===
Year	Title	Role	Notes
1981	Brothers Should Do It	Little Brother	Debut
1981	Kip Noll Superstar	Beautiful Boy	
1982	Bore 'N Stroke	Steve	Fox Studios
1982	Main Attraction	Jon	Nova Films
1982	Members Only	Jon King	
1982	Printer's Devil	Mike	
1982	These Bases Are Loaded	Jon	Laguna Pacific
1983	Biker's Liberty: Big Summer Surprise	Jogger	Falcon Studios
1984	Biggest One I Ever Saw	Prostitute	
1984	Boys of West Hollywood	Boy	
1984	Fade In	Johnny	
1984	Fade Out	Johnny	
1984	Giants 2	Handsome Lad	
1984	Hot Off The Press	Dennis	La Solon Inc.
1984	Hotel Hell	Jon	
1984	Screen Play	Jimmy	
1984	Trick Time	Vincent	
1985	Flip-Flop Fuckers	Jon	
1985	Getting It	John	
1985	Hot Shots 1: All Star Revue	Will	
1985	Inevitable Love	Gym Workout Friend	
1985	Wild Oats	Jon King	
1986	Daddies	Peter	
1986	Hot Shots 4: The Contest Continues	Jon	
1986	Star Shots 2: Jon King	Jon King	
1986	Tyger Tales	Waylon	
1987	Gotta Have It	Miles	
1988	Perfect Summer	Summer Boy	
1990	Best of Jon King	Jon King	
1991	Bi-guy	Jon King	
1991	Magnum Griffin Collection 12	Jon King	
1992	Boys On Call	Logan	
1992	Latin Tongues	Latino Boy	
1993	Assholes and Tongues	Jon	
1993	Solid Intake	Jon King	
1993	Wild Country	Country Boy	Falcon Studios
1994	Forever Hold Your Piece	Jon King	
1994	These Bases Are Loaded 2	Jenkins	Catalina Studios
1995	Pump it Up	Jon	
1997	Best of Dave Logan	Jon King	Posthumous released
1997	Hairy Hole Hounds	Jon King	Posthumous released
1998	Directors' Best William Higgins 2	Jon King	Posthumous released
1998	Locker Room Sex	Jon King	Posthumous released
1999	Catalina Orgies 3	Jon King	Posthumous released
2002	Young Men of the 80's 1	Jon King	Posthumous released
2003	Pre-Condom Mania	Jon King	Posthumous released
2003	Young Cum Pumpers	Jon King	Posthumous released
2004	Old School Man Tools	Jon King	Posthumous released
2006	Butt Pirates	Jon King	Posthumous released
2006	I Wanna Be Fellated	Jon King	Posthumous released
2007	Cock Value	Jon King	Posthumous released
2008	Hole Wreckers	Jon King	Posthumous released
2008	Journey To The Center of the Ass	Jon King	Posthumous released
2012	Flip Flop Boys	Jon King	Posthumous released
2019	Old School Threesomes and Moresomes	Jon King	Posthumous released
2020	Old School Threesomes and Moresomes	Jon King	Posthumous released
2021	Best of Manville Retro	Jon King	Posthumous released

== Notes ==
- Douglas, Jerry (1996). Manshots Vol. 8 No. 8 (Fade Out: Jon King Obituary). FirstHand, Ltd. OCLC 30846924.
