= A Young Man's World =

- DVD cover
- Directed by: Kevin Clarke
- Written by: Kevin Clarke
- Produced by: Barry Knight; Russell Moore
- Starring: Joe Landon; Ashton Ryan
- Cinematography: Barry Knight; Russell Moore
- Production company: Delta Production
- Distributed by: Paladin Video
- Release date: 2000
- Running time: 120 minutes
- Country: United States
- Language: English

Kevin Clarke's A Young Man's World is a 2000 American direct-to-video gay pornographic film written and directed by Kevin Clarke and starring Joe Landon and Ashton Ryan. It was produced and cinematographed by Barry Knight and Russell Moore of Delta Productions and distributed by Paladin Video. The film's duration is two hours; its date of production is July 22, 2000, and it was shot on high-definition video.

== Synopsis ==
Five middle-aged men—Ron Aron, Kevin Clarke, Barry Knight, Russell Moore, and Derrick Stanton; all of whom have non-sexual roles—celebrate Barry Knight's 50th birthday in a spectacular home. They reflect on what they did when they were about 18 and fantasize scenes of young men together.

Scenes

- One: Court Logan and Trent Sebastian; Ron Aron, fantasizing
- Two: Adam Bristol and Justin Roxx; non-sexual roles, fantasizing
- Three: Jonathan Prescott, Antonio Madiera, and Zach Rhodes; Russell Moore, fantasizing
- Four: Aston Ryan and Jace Hughes; Kevin Clarke and Barry Knight, fantasizing
- Five: Joe Landon, Dave Parker, and Adam Bristol; Kevin Clarke, fantasizing

== Cast ==
In order of cast appearance:

- Ashton Ryan
- Court Logan
- Zach Rhodes
- Dave Parker
- Jace Hughes
- Justin Roxx
- Antonio Madiera
- Jonathan Prescott
- Trent Sebastian
- Adam Bristol

Non-sexual

- Ron Aron
- Kevin Clarke
- Barry Knight
- Russell Moore
- Derrick Stanton

== Production ==
Kevin Clarke wrote and directed the film. Barry Knight and Russell Moore of Delta Productions produced and cinematographed the film in high-definition video.

== Reception ==
Giacomo Tramontagna from The Guide magazine awarded the film two stars, and said it was "the juxtaposition of five middle-aged guests with five young guys in swimsuits" and a "problematic tribute to the joys of youth". Tramontgana found the fictional middle-aged male characters demeaning to real-life middle-aged men, and considered this film suitable for either "narcissistic airhead brats who hate older men or youth-obsessed older men who hate themselves". He found the setup of the sex scenes "inconsistent and sometimes disorienting", but he picked scenes between Ashton Ryan and Jace Hughes as "the best of five erotic sequences", which he said were "sincere, spontaneous, lively, [and] passionate".

A reviewer from the Ambush Mag website praised the actors' performances, the music score and sex scenes, and wrote, "you're just gonna love the entire movie". Bo Champion from ManNet.com praised the sex scenes as mandatory to the video and wrote, "while the plot is interesting, the execution is at times too cute and sometimes confusing and, in the end, a bit disconcerting to some of us who are graciously considered Baby Boomers". A reviewer from FriskyFans.org awarded the film four out of five stars and wrote, "A Young Man's World fulfills anyone's desire to see the finest of the finest young men".

== Awards and nominations ==
Adam Bristol, Joe Landon, and Dave Parker

- (Winner) 2001 GayVN Awards — Best Threesome
- (Winner) 2001 Gay Erotic Video Awards — Best Three-way
- (Nominated) 2001 Grabby Awards — Best Threeway Sex Scene
