= L.A. Plays Itself =

1972 experimental gay pornographic film by Fred Halsted

- Title screen
- Directed by: Fred Halsted
- Written by: Fred Halsted
- Produced by: Fred Halsted
- Starring: Jim Frost; Rick Coates; Fred Halsted; Joey Yale (as Joe Yanichek)
- Cinematography: Fred Halsted
- Edited by: Fred Halsted
- Production company: Eight of Clubs
- Distributed by: Halsted Distribution
- Release date: April 1972
- Running time: 55 minutes
- Country: United States
- Language: English

L.A. Plays Itself is a 1972 American experimental gay pornographic film, directed and produced by Fred Halsted. The film is split into two acts, originally intended to be played out of order. The first act (Note: The act order was determined by the Museum of Modern Art restoration of the film and is consistent with other modern day showings.) stars Jim Frost and Rick Coates, whereas the second act stars Halsted and Joey Yale. Yale was Halsted's long-term partner.

At the film's screening, Salvador Dalí was reportedly quoted as saying, "new information for me".

== Plot ==
The film is split into a two-act structure and follows two different couples. L.A. Plays Itself was originally intended to be played out of order.

The first act begins with a sign showing Los Angeles' population. Footage from the mountains of Malibu are shown, accompanied by koto and classical music. Audio from a casual conversation about Los Angeles plays, mentioning cruising in the Malibu wilderness. A hiker walking through the mountains (Jim Frost) discovers a naked man (Rick Coates)—described by several sources as an elf—in a nearby stream. The two have a flirtatious interaction before Coates propositions Frost for oral sex. Frost accepts, and Coates performs oral sex on him. The couple, now both naked, walk around the surrounding nature and briefly go under a waterfall. Coates and Frost's sexual encounter then continues, including several shots of anal sex and further shots of oral sex. Their encounter is interrupted by approaching bulldozers.

The second act begins with Fred Halsted driving across Los Angeles. Shots of the Los Angeles streets are shown (including a billboard for the film Performance), accompanied by electronic music. Audio clips of a conversation between Halsted and another man (Joey Yale) play, revealing that Yale has recently moved to Los Angeles from Houston, and that he is homeless. Halsted offers to temporarily house Yale. Shots of Yale being sadomasochistically tortured by Halsted become interspersed with the aforementioned video of Los Angeles' streets. Halsted whips Yale with a belt, kicks him, forces Yale to perform oral sex while suffocating him with the belt, and makes Yale lick his boots. There is a brief montage focusing on the crotches and buttocks of anonymous men in Griffith Park, before the film cuts back to Yale being tied to a bed by Halsted. The film culminates in Yale getting fisted by Halsted.

== Cast ==
- Jim Frost
- Rick Coates
- Fred Halsted
- Joey Yale (as Joe Yanichek)
- Bob Blount (uncredited)
- Paul Barresi (uncredited)

== Production ==
Fred Halsted states that one of the motivations behind the making of L.A. Plays Itself (and his other films) was "to get S&M and allied perversions out on the screen where people could look at them, think about them, analyze them, let it affect them, whatever they wanted, but not have it hidden anymore, and leave it open where people can deal with it easily." He has been quoted as saying that the film was highly autobiographical.

L.A. Plays Itself was filmed in Malibu, Los Angeles, and Griffith Park. Joey Yale, upon being told of Halsted's plans for the fisting scene, refused to be fisted in an unsimulated manner and was replaced by a body double.

== Legacy ==
Chantal Akerman, who worked as a box office attendant at the 55th Street Playhouse, admitted to skimming over $4000 during L.A. Plays Itself's run. This financed her documentary film Hotel Monterey and her short film duology La Chambre.

The film is featured in Los Angeles Plays Itself, a documentary by Thom Andersen, which also borrows its name from the film.

== See also ==
- List of American films of 1972
