= Mike Henson (actor) =

American actor and model (1963–2002)

- Born: Kenneth John Seymour; October 4, 1963; Salinas, California, U.S.
- Died: September 6, 2002 (aged 38); Philadelphia, Pennsylvania, U.S.
- Resting place: Sacramento
- Other names: Michael Henson; Mike Hanson; Kenny Seymour
- Education: University of California, Los Angeles
- Occupations: Actor; model
- Years active: 1986–2000
- Agent: Falcon Studios

Mike Henson (born Kenneth John Seymour; October 4, 1963 – September 6, 2002) was an American adult film actor and model who rose to prominence during the "Golden Age" of gay adult cinema in the late 1980s and 1990s. He was best known for his clean-cut, boyish looks and his dramatic physical transformation, which established him as a premier star of the era.

== Early life and education ==
Born in Salinas, California, Henson served in the United States Army before settling in Los Angeles to pursue a career in the entertainment industry.

Henson initially answered an advertisement by producer John Summers for Falcon Studios but was rejected for being "too skinny". Henson reportedly told Summers he would work on his body and returned six months later with a significantly more muscular physique. Impressed by the rapid transformation, Summers hired him immediately.

Following his initial retirement in 1991, Henson focused on his health after being diagnosed as HIV-positive. Henson attended the UCLA School of Computer Sciences, graduating in 1994. He subsequently worked in the technology sector, managing computer operations for various businesses.

== Career ==
Henson began his career through David Forest's Brad's Buddies service. He debuted in the 1986 film Two Handfuls; his final scene in that film with Brian Maxon is considered one of the best and most iconic moments in the history of the industry. He quickly became a top-tier performer, often noted for his youthful good looks and athletic body.

In 1987, Henson won the Best Actor award from the X-Rated Critics Organization (XRCO) for his role in the William Higgins classic Big Guns. In 1990, he co-starred with Joey Stefano in More of a Man: The Safe Sex Video, the first gay adult video to emphasize condom use. Stefano, known for his vast industry knowledge, reportedly specifically requested Henson as his co-star. Throughout his peak years, Henson was a fixture in the nightlife scenes of both Los Angeles and San Francisco.

== Departure and intermittent returns ==
Henson first departed the industry in 1991 due to drug addiction, an HIV-positive diagnosis, and a desire to pursue higher education. However, he made intermittent returns over the following five years, appearing in titles such as Score 10 and Powertool 2: Breaking Out. While his physique remained in peak condition during these later appearances, his drug use had taken a visible toll on his youthful looks. This change led some fans to reject his return, as he no longer possessed the specific "boyish" charm that defined his early stardom. While his physique remained in good shape, his long-term drug use had taken a visible toll on his youthful looks, which had been the hallmark of his early appeal.

== Personal life ==
Henson was in a long-term relationship with a former Army buddy named Dennis. He eventually settled with his partner in Pennsylvania.

== Death ==
Henson died on September 6, 2002, in Philadelphia, Pennsylvania, at the age of 38. His boyfriend, Dennis, discovered his body upon returning from work. The cause of death was an accidental heroin overdose. His brother, Bobby Seymour, stated that the family had his body flown back to Sacramento, where he was laid to rest in the Roseville Public Cemetery District.

== Filmography ==
=== Film ===
Year	Title	Role	Notes
1986	Powertool	New Hook-Up	Debut
1986	Two Handfuls	Theatre Patron / Bodybuilder's Buddy	
1986	Screen Test	Michael	
1987	In Hot Pursuit	Wet Friend	
1987	Hot Rods: Young and Hung 2	Flirty Boy	
1987	The Best of Jeff Stryker	Mike	
1987	Big Guns	Navy Lieutenant	
1987	Safer Sex: The Time is Now	Mike	
1987	Bad Boys Club	John's friend	
1988	My Best Buddy: Top of the Pack	Friend	
1988	Briefs: The Best of John Summers	Mike	
1988	Big Bad Boys: Stroke 27	Mike	
1988	Full Load: Maximum Oversize	Ryder	
1988	Lesson Well Learned	Handsome Boy	
1988	My Best Buddy	Mark's Motorcycle Riding Friend	
1988	Bulge: Mass Appeal	Mike	
1989	The Best of John Davenport	Micheal	
1989	Big and Thick	Mike	
1990	More of a Man	Duffy	
1990	Glory Hole of Fame	Mikey	
1990	The Best of Kevin Williams	Mike	
1990	The Best of Mike Henson	Mike	
1990	Sailor in the Wild 2	Surfer	
1991	Catalina Classics	Mike	
1991	Score 10	Douglas	
1992	Catalina Preview Tape 5	Mike	
1992	Powertool 2: Breaking Out	The Hookup in Truck	
1994	Anal Hall of Fame	Mike	
1994	The Best of Lex Baldwin	Mike	
1997	Military Men	Mike	
1997	Hung Heroes 2	Jeff	
2001	Sex in the Can	Mike	
2002	Pre-Condom Mania	Mike	
2002	Jacked Up	Mike	
2003	Wild Young Fuckers	Mike	Posthumous release
2003	Young Cum Pumpers	Micheal	Posthumous release
2011	Bed Head	Micheal	Posthumous release

== Awards and nominations ==
Name of the award ceremony, year presented, category, nominee of the award, and the result of the nomination
Award ceremony	Year	Category	Nominee / Work	Result	Ref.
X-Rated Critics Organization	1987	Best Actor	Big Guns	Won	
