= James Leonard Waldrop =

American actor and model (1955–1986)

- Born: James Leonard Waldrop Jr. July 21, 1955; Dallas, Dallas County, Texas, U.S.
- Died: December 15, 1986 (aged 31); Los Angeles, Los Angeles County, California, U.S.
- Other names: James Leonard Waldrop; J.W. King; Jim King; Jim Waldrop; Shaun Victors; Tom Cartwright; Brandon Adams; Todd Avery
- Occupations: Actor; Model
- Years active: 1978–1986
- Agent(s): Colt Studios; Falcon Studios

James Leonard Waldrop Jr. (July 21, 1955 – December 15, 1986), known professionally as J.W. King, was a prominent American actor and model in the gay adult film industry during the early 1980s. He rose to national fame as a Playgirl centerfold before becoming one of the most recognizable stars of the "Golden Age" of gay cinema.

== Early life ==
James Leonard Waldrop Jr. was born on July 21, 1955, in Dallas, Texas, to James Leonard Waldrop Sr. and Anita Louise Stephens. He was the eldest of three children and grew up in Dallas with two younger siblings Timothy Michael Hunnicutt, a younger brother and Susan Kathleen Davis Culberson, his youngest sister.

In September 1979, Waldrop competed in the Mr. Dallas Contest, where he placed as the first runner-up. Shortly after the competition, he relocated to Los Angeles, California, to pursue a career in modeling and acting.

== Career ==
=== Modeling ===
Waldrop's career began in the physique and gay adult magazine circuit under the name Jim Waldrop. His tall stature, athletic build, and tanned complexion made him a popular subject for photographers. His mainstream breakthrough occurred when he was selected as the "Man of the Month" centerfold for the January 1981 issue of Playgirl magazine.

=== Adult Film Industry ===
Adopting the stage name J.W. King, he entered the adult film industry in 1978. Over a seven-year career, he appeared in many films in 1980s. He was known for his versatility, sometimes appearing clean-shaven and other times sporting a beard, as seen in Gold Rush Boys and Tightropes at the Officers Club. Despite the frequent billing as the "older brother" of Jon King, it was purely a marketing strategy used to boost the popularity of films like Brothers Should Do It.

== Personal life ==
Waldrop lived in the Hollywood Hills during his time in Los Angeles. He was romantically involved with fellow adult film actors R.J. Reynolds and John Murphy. Around 1985, Waldrop retired from the adult film industry. In the final 30 months of his life, he worked as a waiter at the Sheraton Premiere Hotel in Universal City. He maintained close friendships with fellow performers Kip Noll and Jeremy Scott.

== Death ==
Waldrop died on December 15, 1986, at a hospital in Hollywood, Los Angeles, California, due to complications from AIDS. He was 31 years old. His death followed that of his partner, John Murphy, by only one month. He was returned to his hometown and buried at Laurel Land Memorial Park in Dallas, Texas.

== Filmography ==
=== Film ===
Year	Title	Role	Notes
1978	Big Men on Campus: The Fraternity	Sean	Debut
1980	Big Man on Campus	Shaun	
1980	Closed Set	Shaun	
1980	Ballgame	Spectator #22	
1981	Pacific Coast Highway	Tom	
1981	Rawhide	Foreman Rick	
1981	Palace of Pleasures	Lifeguard	
1981	Brothers Should Do It	Big Brother	Marketed as brother of Jon King
1981	The Class of '84 Part 2	Draft Teacher	
1981	San Francisco	James	Credited as Jim King
1981	Performance	J.W. King	Credited as Jim King
1981	Jockstrap	J.W. King	Credited as Jim King
1981	Man to Man Heat: Three Is a Dream	J.W. King	Colt Studio production
1982	Wet Shorts	Jack Carpenter	Credited as Jack Carpenter
1982	Turned On	Jim	
1982	Three Day Pass	Petty Officer	
1982	These Bases Are Loaded	Mike	
1982	Nighthawk in Leather	Tom	
1982	Caught from Behind	Man in First Orgy	Credited as Tom Cartwright
1982	California Boys	Handsome Guy	Credited as Jim King
1982	A Night at Halsted's	Beautiful Boy	
1983	Gold Rush Boys	Sheriff	Credited as Jim King
1983	Tightropes at the Officers Club	Officer	
1983	Choice Cuts	J.W.	
1983	Sun Strokes	Jim	Featured in Best of Colt 1 & 2
1986	Kink: Hot Shots 6	J.W. King	
1991	The Best of Colt Films: Part 10	J.W. King	Posthumous released
1996	The Best of Jon King	J.W. King	Posthumous released
1999	Bucky's XXX Rated All-Male Beavers: Locker Room Loops Vol. 1	Man	Posthumous released
2010	Blue Vanities: Classic Gay Smut from the Past, Vol. 333	J.W. King	Posthumous released

== Legacy ==
He is also commemorated on Block #01357 of the AIDS Memorial Quilt under his birth name, Jim Waldrop.
