= Shawn Mayotte =

American actor and model (1965–2022)

- Born: Douglas Probst; April 1, 1965; Solano County, Sacramento, California, U.S.
- Died: November 4, 2022 (aged 57); Los Angeles, California, U.S.
- Other names: Doug Probst; Shaw Mayotte
- Occupations: Actor; Model; Musician; Author
- Years active: 1982–2022
- Agent: Falcon Studios
- Children: 1

Douglas Probst (April 1, 1965 – November 4, 2022), better known by his stage name Shawn Mayotte, was an American musician, survivor advocate, author, and adult film performer and model. Probst rose to fame in the 1980s as one of the era's most recognizable nude models and adult film stars before transitioning into a career as a professional musician and a prominent advocate for survivors of child sexual abuse.

== Early life ==
Born in Sacramento, Solano County, California, Probst experienced a childhood marked by severe trauma. He was raised by an abusive father and an alcoholic mother who failed to protect him and his sister from domestic violence. At age 12, he was entered into the LA County Probation System and placed in various Catholic-run boys' homes, where he later reported being subjected to years of systemic sexual assault by priests and staff. He was emancipated at age 17 in 1982.

== Career ==
=== The "Shawn Mayotte" Era (1982–1989) ===
Probst adopted the name Shawn Mayotte in 1982 and became a highly recognizable figure in the adult industry during the decade. He appeared in numerous adult films, often credited as Dirk. Throughout the 1980s, his image appeared on the covers and centerfolds of numerous pornographic publications. He appeared in several notable films for studios such as YMAC Video, including 7 Up & Cummin (1982), Hot, High and Horny (1983) alongside Scott Sedgwick, and Peep Show (1984). He was a top nude model whose image was featured on dozens of magazine covers and centerfolds.

Probst operated an elite male escort service. His clients reportedly included high-profile industry figures such as music mogul David Geffen, actor Robert Reed, and producer Michael Filerman.

In his later years, Probst was critical of the adult industry's treatment of performers during the HIV/AIDS crisis, specifically accusing producers like William Higgins of negligence regarding safer sex practices.

=== Music and Advocacy ===
Beyond the adult industry, Probst was a gifted keyboardist and songwriter. He collaborated with several major artists, including Billy Preston, James Ingram, and Neil Young.

In 2007, he became a lead spokesperson for 508 victims in a landmark lawsuit against the Los Angeles Catholic Archdiocese. His direct confrontation with Cardinal Roger Mahony during stalled negotiations was instrumental in achieving a historic $660 million settlement for survivors.

== Personal life ==
He married Marie and had a son named Joshua.

== Death ==
Probst died from complications of throat cancer on November 4, 2022, in Los Angeles, California. He is survived by his wife, Marie, and his son, Josh.

== Filmography ==
=== Film ===
Year	Title	Role	Notes
1982	7 Up & Cummin	Dirk	Debut
1983	Hot, High and Horny	Dirk	
1984	Peep Show	Dirk	

== Publications and Legacy ==
In 2021, Probst published his memoir, Mayotte: The Musings of a Narcissist: A Survivor's Story. The book serves as a "true unmasking," detailing his survival of institutional abuse, the loss of nearly all his friends to AIDS, and his journey toward sobriety and fatherhood.
