= Gay pornography =

Pornography depicting sex acts between males

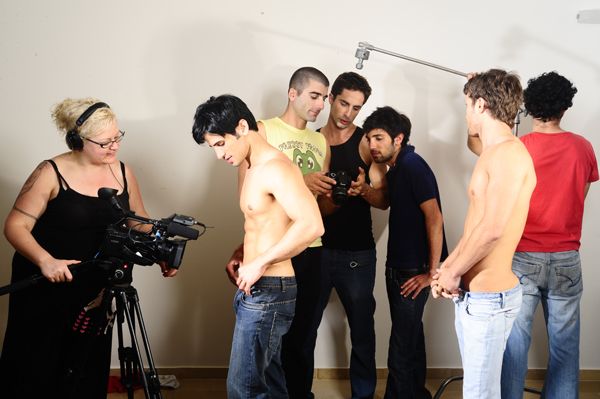
Photograph on the set of Lucas Entertainment's Men of Israel film shoot, with director Michael Lucas discussing the shoot with the cast

Gay pornography is a form of adult entertainment that features sexual activity between males with the primary goal to sexually arouse its audience. Softcore gay pornography also exists; which at one time constituted the genre, and may be produced as beefcake pornography directed toward heterosexual female, homosexual male, and bisexual audiences of any gender. Although it has also been found that many heterosexual males consume this genre of porn as well due to its appeal in presenting a more visually stimulating or unconventional sexual dynamic, citing the focus on intimacy and male-male attraction as a source of novelty or excitement.

Homoerotic art and artifacts depicting men have a long history, reaching back to many ancient civilizations. Every medium has been used to represent sexual acts between men. In contemporary mass media, this is mostly shared through home videos (including DVDs), cable broadcast and emerging video on demand and wireless markets, as well as online picture sites and gay pulp fiction.

== History ==
=== Early modern in the United States ===
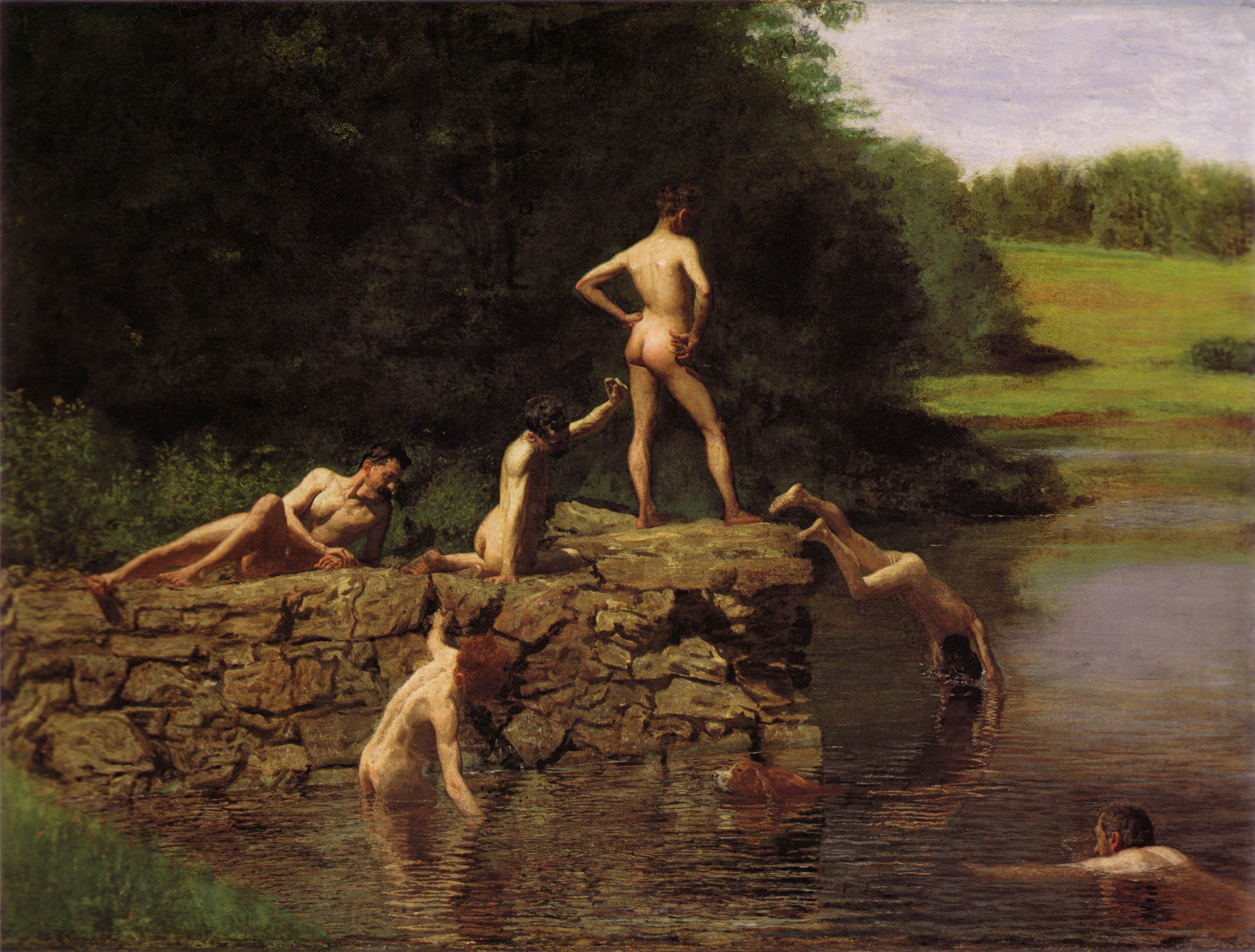
The Swimming Hole (1884–85) by the American artist Thomas Eakins (1844–1916) is regarded as a masterpiece of American painting, and has been called "the most finely designed of all his outdoor pictures". The painting has been "widely cited as a prime example of homoeroticism in American art". Eakins himself appears in the water at bottom right – "in signature position, so to speak." According to Jonathan Weinberg, The Swimming Hole marked the beginning of homoerotic imagery in American art.

Homoeroticism has been present in photography and film since their invention. During much of that time, any sexual depiction had to remain underground because of obscenity laws. In particular, gay material might constitute evidence of an illegal act under sodomy laws in many jurisdictions. This is no longer the case in the United States, since such laws were ruled unconstitutional by the Supreme Court in 2003 in Lawrence v. Texas.

Hardcore pornographic motion pictures (stag films, as they were called prior to their legalization in 1970) were produced relatively early in the history of film. The first known pornographic film appears to have been made in Europe in 1908. The earliest known film to depict hardcore gay (and bisexual) sexual activity was the French film Le ménage moderne du Madame Butterfly, produced and released in 1920. Most historians consider the first American stag film to be A Free Ride, produced and released in 1915. In the United States, hardcore gay sexual activity did not make it onto film until 1929's The Surprise of a Knight. Other American examples include A Stiff Game from the early 1930s, which features interracial homosexual acts as part of its plot, and Three Comrades (1950s), which features exclusively homosexual activity.

Legal restrictions meant that early hardcore gay pornography was underground and that commercially available gay pornography primarily consisted of pictures of individual men either fully naked or wearing a G-string. Pornography in the 1940s and 1950s focused on athletic men or bodybuilders in statuesque poses. They were generally young, muscular, and with little or no visible body hair. These pictures were sold in physique magazines, also known as beefcake magazines, allowing the reader to pass as a fitness enthusiast.

The Athletic Model Guild (AMG), founded by photographer Bob Mizer in 1945 in Los Angeles, was arguably the first studio to commercially produce material specifically for gay men and published the first magazine known as Physique Pictorial in 1951. Tom of Finland drawings are featured in many issues. Mizer produced about a million images, and thousands of films and videos before he died on May 12, 1992. During the late 1960s and early 1970s, the advent of 16 mm film cameras enabled these photographers to produce underground movies of gay sex, male masturbation, or both. Sales of these products were either by mail-order or through more discreet channels. Some of the early gay pornographers would travel around the country selling their photographs and films out of their hotel rooms, with advertising only through word of mouth and magazine ads.

The 1960s were also a period where many underground art-film makers integrated suggestive or overtly gay content in their work. Kenneth Anger's Scorpio Rising (1963), Andy Warhol's Blow Job (1963) and My Hustler (1965), or Paul Morrissey's Flesh (1968) are examples of experimental films that are known to have influenced further gay pornographic films with their formal qualities and narratives. Also of note is Joe Dallesandro, who acted in hardcore gay pornographic films in his early 20s, posed nude for Francesco Scavullo, Bruce of L.A. and Bob Mizer, and later acted for Warhol in films such as Flesh. Dallesandro was well known to the public. In 1969 Time called him one of the most beautiful people of the 1960s, and he appeared on the cover of Rolling Stone magazine in April 1971. Dallesandro also appeared on the cover of The Smiths' eponymous debut album, The Smiths.

=== Sexual revolution ===
During the 1960s, a series of United States Supreme Court rulings created a more liberalized legal environment that allowed the commercialization of pornography. MANual Enterprises, Inc. v. Day was the first decision by the United States Supreme Court which held that magazines consisting largely of photographs of nude or near-nude male models are not obscene within the meaning of § 1461. It was the first case in which the Court engaged in plenary review of a Post Office Department order holding obscene matter "nonmailable." The case is notable for its ruling that photographs of nude men are not obscene, an implication which opened up the U.S. Postal Service to nude male pornographic magazines, especially those catering to gay men.

Wakefield Poole's Boys in the Sand, starring Casey Donovan, was the first gay pornographic feature film, along with the works of filmmakers such as Pat Rocco and the Park Theatre, Los Angeles, California, c. 1970. In fact, it was the first pornographic feature film of any sort. Boys in the Sand opened in a theater in New York City in December 1971 and played to a packed house with record-breaking box office receipts, preceding Deep Throat, the first commercial straight pornography film in America, which opened in June 1972. This success launched gay pornographic film as a popular phenomenon. Early adult gay films also included underground works by Andy Warhol, Kenneth Anger, and Jack Smith.

The production of gay pornography films expanded during the 1970s. A few studios released films for the growing number of gay adult movie theaters, where men could also have sexual encounters. Often, the films reflected the sexual liberation that gay men were experiencing at the time, depicting the numerous public spaces where men engaged in sex: bathhouses, sex clubs, beaches, etc.

Peter Berlin's 1973 film Nights in Black Leather was the first major pornographic film designed to appeal to the gay leather subculture and drew some mainstream gays into this culture.

The 1960s and 1970s also saw the rise of gay publishing with After Dark and Michael's Thing. During this time many more magazines were founded, including In Touch and Blueboy. Playgirl, ostensibly produced for women, was purchased and enjoyed by gay men and feature full frontal nudity (the posing straps and fig leaves were removed).

Gay pornography of the 1950s through the production date of the movie is reviewed, with many excerpts, in Fred Halsted's documentary Erotikus: A History of the Gay Movie (1974).

=== 1970s ===
From 1970 to 1985, commercial gay pornography was just getting set up to become the large industry that it was to become. Because it was in the fledgling stage, it recruited actors from the only network it had access to: the gay community. Even among members of the gay community, people willing to act in gay porn were hard to come by due to the social stigma and implicated social risk of being publicly out.

==== France ====
In the mid-1970s, French hardcore pornography achieved commercial success, including a significant portion of gay films. Pornography was seen as a part of the French gay liberation movement, because it ensured popular representations of gay sex. Members of the socialist revolutionary Homosexual Front for Revolutionary Action (FHAR) and its descendant organization, the Homosexual Liberation Group sometimes derided gay pornography as overly "bourgeois" and "fascist". Valéry Giscard d’Estaing's government introduced social reforms in 1974, including lowering the age of consent from 21 to 18, for heterosexual and homosexual men. D'Estaing was also publicly opposed to the censorship of cinema, allowing the erotic cinema industry to grow under his administration; in 1975, pornography amounted to 25% of film industry revenue. Early gay pornographers like Norbert Terry and Jacques Scandelari achieved commercial success through their producers, Troika Films and Greenwood Films, and adult theaters like La Marotte and Le Dragon. In 1979, Terry founded the Club Vidéo Gay, a private association which circumvented French obscenity laws. Many films produced during this time were set and filmed in New York City, reflected New York's gay subculture, and depicted sexual practices like fisting and S&M.

Auteur Jean-Daniel Cadinot arose as a gay pornographer in the late 1970s, capitalizing on new VHS technology and depicting fantastical narratives from French history in his work. In some of his films, actors played underage boys, leading to criticism, especially after the Coral Affair in which multiple writers and academics were accused of child sex abuse.

==== United States ====
During the 1970s, gay pornography constituted the bulk of American gay visual culture; discourses about sexual practices were "inseparable" from discussions of gay politics and lifestyles. Early gay pornographers marketed films first as "gay", rather than primarily pornographic works. The most popular figures of the early 1970s industry included Wakefield Poole, Fred Halsted, Jerry Douglas, Joe Gage, and Peter Berlin. Nights in Black Leather (1973) was promoted in The Advocate for seven months before its release, demonstrating the popularity of gay pornographic films during this time. Many 1970s gay films had long sequences depicting cruising, often with experimental, nonlinear narratives that reflected 1960s avant-garde filmmaking.

===== Los Angeles =====
In Los Angeles, gay pornography producers like Jaguar Productions were targeted by the Los Angeles Police Department (LAPD) for their distribution of gay films. In the late 1960s after the Stonewall Riots, Los Angeles gay liberationists and filmmakers monetized gay culture, promoting adult theaters with words like "male" and “homosexual." Theaters like the Park showed work from mail-order filmmakers like Bob Mizer and Dick Fontaine as well as underground gay films by Kenneth Anger and Jack Smith. The Jaguar was founded in 1971, and promoted gay films in newspaper advertisements and theater marquees. The LAPD started seizing adult material in 1972; theaters like Las Palmas were surveilled, and gay citizens and institutions were registered and tracked. The police were working under the auspices of Ginzberg v. United States which enabled the prosecution of obscenity. By 1974, an extensive police investigation and intimidation campaign had crippled Jaguar Productions; police seized film material which is now located in the University of California, Los Angeles Stanley Fleishman papers archive.

=== 1980s ===
The 1980s were a period of transition for gay pornography film. The proliferation of VCRs made pornography videos easily accessible, and, as their prices fell, the market for home videos aimed at adult viewers became more and more lucrative. By the mid-1980s, the standard was to release pornography movies directly on video, which meant the wide disappearance of pornography theaters. Furthermore, video recording being more affordable, a multitude of producers entered the market, making low-budget pornography videos.

This shift from watching pornography as a public activity to doing so in private was also influenced by the discovery of HIV and the subsequent AIDS crisis. Public spaces for sex, such as theaters, became less attended when in the early 1980s it became a much riskier behavior. Masturbatory activities in the privacy of the home became a safe sex practice in the midst of this health crisis.

Gay movies of the 1970s had contained some exploration of novel ways to represent the sexual act. In the 1980s, by contrast, all movies seemed to be made under an unwritten set of rules and conventions. Most scenes would start with a few lines of dialogue, have performers engage in foreplay (fellatio), followed by anal penetration, and ending with a visual climax close-up of ejaculating penises, called a money shot or cum shot. Video technology allowed the recording of longer scenes than did the costly film stock. Scenes were often composed of extended footage of the same act filmed from different shots using multiple cameras. The quality of the picture and sound were often very poor.

Major directors such as Matt Sterling, Eric Peterson, John Travis, and William Higgins set the standard for the models of the decade. The performers they cast were especially young, usually appearing to be around the ages of 22 or 23. Their bodies were slender and hairless, of the "swimmer's build" type, which contrasted with the older, bigger, and hairier man of the 1970s' gay pornography. Performer roles also evolved into the tight divisions of tops and bottoms. The top in anal sex is the penetrating partner, who, in these films, typically has a more muscular body and the larger penis. The bottom, or receiver of anal sex, in the films, is often smaller and sometimes more effeminate. The stars of the decade were almost always tops, while the bottoms were interchangeable (with the exception of Joey Stefano, a popular star, who was more of a bottom.)

This strict division between tops and bottoms may have reflected a preference by some of the popular directors of the decade to hire heterosexual men for their movies. Heterosexual men who perform gay sex for monetary reasons (commonly labeled gay-for-pay) were considered a rare commodity in the gay sex trade, but the biggest producers of the decade could afford them. Many critics attributed the conventionalization of gay pornography of the 1980s to this trend.

=== After 1985 ===
1985 was a pivotal year for gay porn because by then, the market had grown enough to make it a desirable field of work for not only gay men but also straight men. According to one estimate by porn director Chi Chi Larue, 60% of the actors in gay porn are actually straight. "Gay-for-pay" and the ethics behind it and implications of it are highly disputed.

=== 1990s ===
The gay pornography industry diversified steadily during the 1990s.

In 1989, director Kristen Bjorn started a pornographic business which was considered as setting a standard for gay pornography producers. He was a professional photographer, and the images in his videos were considered to be of high-quality. As a former porn star himself, he directed his models with care, which helped improved the actors' believability. Other directors had to improve their technical quality to keep up with demands from their audiences.

Another significant change during this decade was the explosion of the niche market. Many videos began to be produced for viewers with specific tastes (i.e. for amateur pornography, military (men in uniform) pornography, transgender performers, bondage fetishes, performers belonging to specific ethnic groups, etc.), and this led to a diversification of the people involved in pornography production and consumption.

The gay pornography industry grew substantially in popularity during the 1990s, evolving into a complex and interactive subculture. Professional directors (such as Chi Chi LaRue and John Rutherford), technicians or deck operators during the U-matic phase of video technology, and performers started to engage in pornography as a career, their work sustained by emerging pornographic media and critics, such as Mikey Skee.

=== 21st century ===
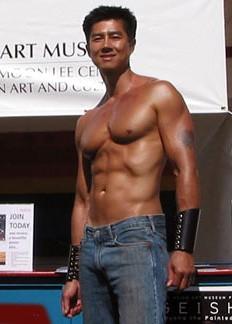
Van Darkholme

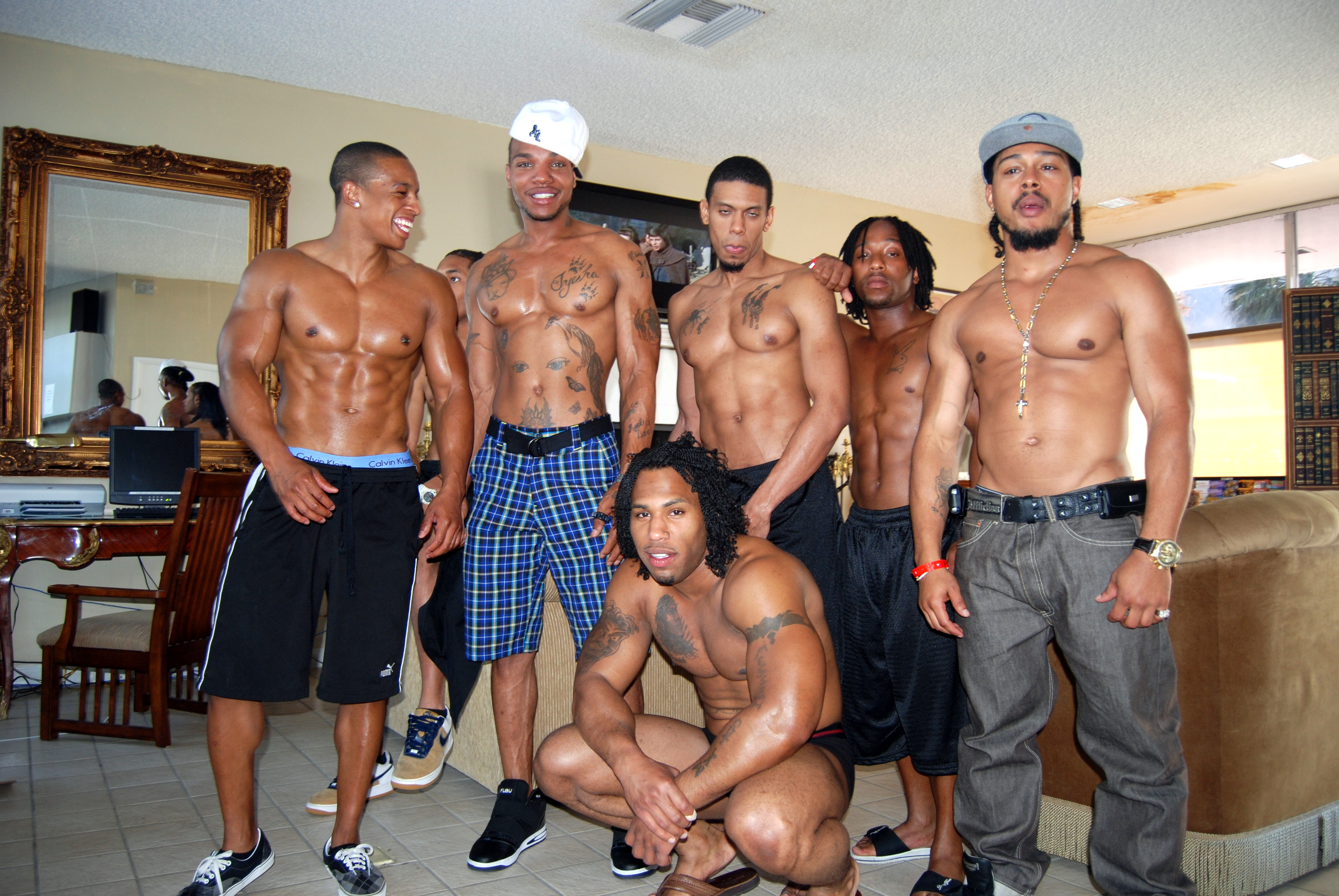
Photo taken during the 2010 Blatino Erotica Awards

In the 21st century, gay pornography has become a highly profitable enterprise, ranging from the "straight-guy" pornography of Active Duty and Sean Cody, to the 'twinks' of BelAmi. Many niche genres and online delivery sites cater to various and changing interests. For instance much of Van Darkholme's work contains bondage and particularly shibari, the Japanese art of bondage and knot-tying, a specialty within BDSM cultures.

On the other hand, Lucas Kazan Productions successfully adapted literary classics: Decameron: Two Naughty Tales is based on two novels by Boccaccio, The Innkeeper on Goldoni's La Locandiera. Lucas Kazan also found inspiration in 19th and 20th century operas, combining gay porn and melodrama: The School for Lovers, 2007 GayVN Award Winner for Best Foreign Picture, is in fact inspired by Mozart's Così fan tutte.

Some controversy currently exists regarding studios that produce bareback videos (videos of sexual penetration by the penis without a condom). Mainstream companies, such as Falcon Entertainment, Hot House Entertainment, Channel 1 Releasing, Lucas Entertainment, Raging Stallion Studios, Lucas Kazan Productions and Titan Media and LGBTQ health advocates assert that condomless videos promote unsafe sex and contribute to the HIV/AIDS pandemic, both in the pornography industry and in the gay community as a whole. The controversy dates back to the first few years of the HIV crisis, when nearly all gay pornography production companies voluntarily required their models to wear condoms for anal sex.

The premise of industry figures, notably Chi Chi LaRue, is that gay pornography serves as a leading forum for teaching safer sex skills and modelling healthy sexual behaviors. At least one bareback studio agrees that porn should promote healthy sexual behaviors, but disagrees on the definition of healthy in this context: speaking about the AIDS crisis, Treasure Island Media owner and founder Paul Morris has expressed his belief that,

To a great extent, the current gay mindset surrounding HIV is a result of a generation of men living with PTSD and not getting the support and help they need now that the war is over. [...] As a pornographer, all I can do in response is to produce work that features men who are openly positive (or negative) and happily living their lives honestly and fully.

=== Sex education ===
Emerging research has suggested that pornography is a possible source of education about sex and relationships. In the absence of inclusive same-sex relationship education in traditional sources (i.e., schools, parents, friends, and mainstream media), gay pornography may be used by men who have sex with men as a source of information about intimacy, while serving its main purpose as a masturbatory aid. Contrary to popular views that pornography does not depict intimacy, a recent study showed that gay pornography depicts both physical and verbal intimacy.

== Audience ==
In August 2005, adult star Jenna Jameson launched "Club Thrust", an interactive website featuring gay male pornographic videos, which was shown to attract a female audience as well. Women comprise over a third of Pornhub's views of gay male pornography, with many preferring it over heterosexual porn due to it being less degrading to women, as heterosexual porn is often aimed at men and tends to objectify and degrade women, while gay male porn allows women to focus on their attraction to men without the same objectification or the male gaze typically found in heterosexual porn.

Research has shown that a significant portion of viewers of gay pornography are heterosexual men, with a 2018 study by YouPorn revealing that around a quarter of straight men report watching gay porn at least occasionally.

Yaoi comic books and slash fiction are both genres featuring gay men, but primarily written by and for straight women. Some lesbian and bisexual women are also fans of gay male pornography, specifically yaoi, for its feminine-styled men. Although the genre is marketed to females, there is a gay, bisexual, and heterosexual male readership as well.

== Types ==
=== Bareback ===
Bareback gay pornography was standard in "pre-condom" films from the 1970s and early 1980s. As awareness of the risk of AIDS developed, pornography producers came under pressure to use condoms, both for the health of the performers and to serve as role models for their viewers. By the early 1990s new pornographic videos usually featured the use of condoms for anal sex. Beginning in the 1990s, an increasing number of studios have been devoted to the production of new films featuring men engaging in unprotected sex. For example, San Francisco-based studio Treasure Island Media, whose work focuses in this area, has produced bareback films since 1999. Other companies that do so include SEVP and Eurocreme. Mainstream gay pornographic studios such as Kristen Bjorn Productions have featured the occasional bareback scene, such as in "El Rancho" between performers who are real-life partners. Other studios such as Falcon Entertainment have also reissued older pre-condom films. Also, mainstream studios that consistently use condoms for anal sex scenes may sometimes choose editing techniques that make the presence of condoms somewhat ambiguous and less visually evident, and thus may encourage viewers to fantasize that barebacking is taking place, even though the performers are following safer-sex protocols. (In contrast, some mainstream directors are conscientious about using close-up shots of condom packets being opened, etc., to help clearly establish for the viewer that the sex is not bareback.)

Some scholars argue that while "barebacking" and "UAI" (unprotected anal intercourse) technically both mean the same thing, they have different undertones. With the increased use of the term "barebacking", the term has been adopted for marketing purposes. This is because the term "unprotected anal intercourse" makes a direct connection between unprotected sex and the risk of contracting diseases like HIV/AIDS. In a study where participants were shown two different scenes featuring anal sex, the significance of the words "bareback" and "UAI" became apparent.

The first scene featured group sex in which several men were on top engaging in intercourse with one man on the bottom. The men on top were in their mid-30s and of varying ethnicities while the man on the bottom was around 18 years old. The second scene featured two men both in their 20s in a living room setting. During the interview, the participants were much more reluctant to classify the second scene as "bareback" or "UAI", than they were for the first scene. Participants readily used "bareback" to describe the first scene in which there were clear contrasts in race, age, and power. The participants described the second scene as being more "meaningful and romantic" and hence more likely to use a condom to protect the other. The implication of this study is that the term "bareback" ultimately does have a dark meaning as it relates to HIV/AIDS, regardless if it does not mention protection in its name. Thus, studies have shown that barebacking is decreasing in popularity within the gay subculture. Bareback pornography does not necessarily encourage more unprotected anal sex in reality, nor do all men who participate in anal sex necessarily want to have unprotected sex. What is clear is that there is still a sense of risk among participants of anal sex.

=== Gay-for-pay ===
The authenticity and ethics behind gay-for-pay porn are highly disputed, even within the gay community. Viewers of gay porn in a survey by Escoffier reported a preference for authentic porn, which they define as exhibiting both erections and orgasms. Escoffier argues if straight-identifying actors are able to deliver erections and orgasms to the set, their performance is classified as situational homosexuality; therefore, the porn itself is authentic gay porn. Simon and Gagnon examine authenticity through scripts, arguing that porn actors follow learned behavioral sex scripts, so no porn is any more or less authentic than any other porn.

Because the term "gay-for-pay" implies a motivation that is solely economic, Escoffier argues it is not a fitting title. Other reasons certain gay-for-pay actors report for their career choice include latent homosexual fantasy and curiosity.

Among gay-for-pay actors, there is divided preference for the performance roles of top vs. bottom. It is common for gay-for-pay porn actors to start out as tops before they eventually give in to fan and industry pressure to shoot a scene or more as a bottom. Gay-for-pay actors are typically more comfortable being tops because the role of top is analogous to the "less gay" penetrator role of the man in straight sex. On the other hand, some gay-for-pay porn actors prefer to act as bottoms because they can do so without maintaining an erection. The implication here is that they are not even necessarily aroused during sex, making this the "less gay" of the two positions.

Even though they are acting in gay porn, some gay-for-pay actors hold homophobic views, causing tension in the workplace. Additionally, gay actors often find it difficult to perform with straight actors due to the lack of attraction. Tommy Cruise, a bisexual actor in gay porn, is quoted saying, "A lot of straight guys, they don't even want me touching them. I'm like 'Why are you even in this business?'" Some gay and bisexual porn actors, such as Buddy Jones, enjoy working with straight men in some circumstances.

== Analysis ==
=== "Boy scout" pornography ===
Film studies scholar Ian Fleischman criticized the relationship between bareback "boy scout" narratives in German gay pornography and ecofascist tropes in Hitler Youth propaganda. Fleischman argued that Heimat and Lebensraum, Nazi concepts which emphasized virgin landscapes, corresponded to eugenicist ideas which privileged racially pure German youth. Additionally, the Hitler Youth movement was itself erotic, according to Fleischman, who drew on Susan Sontag's idea of the erotic within fascism in "Fascinating Fascism" (1974). Jean-Daniel Cadinot and Rolf Hammerschmidt were the foremost directors of the "boy scout" movement, which solidified the post-Nazi link between untouched nature and young white bodies in gay pornography.

=== Archives ===
University of California, Irvine film professor Lucas Hilderbrand noted that many American gay archives and special collections hold large amounts of pornography, often personal collections donated by white gay men. Especially after the rise of home video systems in the 1980s, gay pornography became easy to collect. Much archival pornography centers white gay men, and depicts queer men of color in racial fetish roles. Since the 1990s, LGBTQ writers like Michael Bronski, Thomas Waugh, and Tim Dean have emphasized the status of gay pornography as a form of cultural heritage, and a vehicle for queer representation in media. Since scholars began critically engaging with gay archives, the archive itself has become an object of desire for researchers.

=== Masculinity ===
Gender and sexuality studies scholar John Mercer wrote on the depiction of masculinity as a sexual fetish within gay pornography. Mercer argued that "idealized, generic, muscular, male performers" is an iconographic "prototype" within the genre, built on the idea of the stereotype. This prototype is manufactured repetitively in gay pornography production, mass produced, and flexible to changing trends. Mercer cited the work of Tom of Finland, Kurt Marshall, Kevin Williams, George Quaintance, and Harry Bush as contributors to this prototype.

== Notable movies ==
=== 1970s ===
- Boys in the Sand (Wakefield Poole, 1971) is the first feature gay pornographic film to achieve mainstream crossover success; helped usher in "porn chic." Said to be "a textbook example of gay erotic filmmaking" that was screened in film festivals all over the world.
- The Back Row (Jerry Douglas, 1972) is the first feature from Douglas. Re-made by Chi Chi LaRue in 2001. Featured in Unzipped Magazine's The 100 Greatest Gay Adult Films Ever Made (2005).
- L.A. Plays Itself (Fred Halsted, 1972) is archived at the Museum of Modern Art (MoMA), New York.
- Nights in Black Leather (Richard Abel and Peter Berlin, 1973) is a movie starring Peter Berlin.
- Falconhead (Michael Zen, 1977) is still acclaimed by cultural critics as one of a few gay pornographic movies that tried to bring complexity to the blue movie. Inspired many contemporary pornographic directors (Morris, 2004). Featured in Unzipped Magazine's The 100 Greatest Gay Adult Films Ever Made (2005).
- Dune Buddies (Jack Deveau, 1978) Hand in Hand Films, is a film by a prominent director and studio of the 1970s. Shot on the historically gay-friendly Fire Island, the film (and others of the company) document well the sexual lives of New York City's gay men of the period. Excerpts displayed in the documentary Gay Sex in the 70s.
- New York City Inferno (Jacques Scandelari, 1978), a French experimental gay pornography film featuring a licensed soundtrack by the Village People.
- The Other Side of Aspen series, beginning in 1978, is among the Adult Video News' top ten all time gay movies.
- Joe Gage wrote a trilogy of gay films, collectively referred to as either "The Kansas City Trilogy" or "The Working Man Trilogy" in the late 1970s. The films, Kansas City Trucking Co. (1976), El Paso Wrecking Corp. (1978) and L.A. Tool & Die (1979) were praised for their consistent portrayals of male/male sex occurring between rugged, masculine men who came from blue-collar and rural backgrounds and who related as "equal partners" – avoiding the frequent stereotypes of such men as effeminate inhabitants of urban gay neighborhoods, or who were caught up in a constraining "you play the woman, I'll be the man" mindset of dominant/submissive roles.

=== 1980s ===
- The Bigger The Better (Matt Sterling, 1984); one of Adult Video News' 10 Great Gay Movies.
- Les Minets Sauvages (Jean-Daniel Cadinot, 1984) is one of the biggest films by the French pornographic director.
- My Masters (Christopher Rage, 1986) is one movie by a director who has influenced numerous gay artists.
- Powertool (John Travis, 1986) is one of Adult Video News' 10 Great Gay Movies.
- Big Guns (William Higgins, 1988) Catalina Video; is one of Adult Video News' 10 Great Gay Movies.
- Carnival in Rio (Kristen Bjorn, 1989); see History, 1990s section above.

=== 1990s ===
- Idol Eyes (Matt Sterling, 1990) Huge Video is a movie with Ryan Idol. Read Dyer, 1994 for more.
- More of a Man (Jerry Douglas, 1994) All Worlds Video is a popular film with Joey Stefano (see History, 1980s section) also featuring Chi Chi LaRue in a non-sexual role. Read Burger, 1995 chapter for an extensive analysis.
- Flashpoint (John Rutherford, 1994) Falcon Studios is a film by major director Rutherford. Featured in Unzipped Magazine's The 100 Greatest Gay Adult Films Ever Made (2005).
- Frisky Summer 1–4 (George Duroy, 1995–2002) Bel Ami is one of Adult Video News' 10 Great Gay Movies.
- Flesh and Blood (Jerry Douglas, 1996) All Worlds Video is one of Adult Video News' 10 Great Gay Movies.
- Naked Highway (Wash West, 1997). The narrative and aesthetic qualities of this movie are representative of a new generation of pornographic directors. (Thomas, 2000:66) One of Adult Video News' 10 Great Gay Movies.
- Three Brothers (Gino Colbert, 1998) Gino Pictures is a movie by director Colbert, starring the real-life Rockland brothers (Hal, Vince, and Shane). Featured in Unzipped Magazine's The 100 Greatest Gay Adult Films Ever Made (2005).
- Descent (Steven Scarborough, 1999) Hot House Entertainment is a popular gay pornographic video with infrequent artistic qualities, by a prominent director and studio. Created legal dispute in Canada when the government tried to forbid its distribution in the name of obscenity rules.
- Skin Gang (Bruce LaBruce, 1999) Cazzo Film is a film by art/porn director LaBruce. Aired in gay film festivals around the world.
- Fallen Angel (Bruce Cam, 1997) Titan Media is a major film by prominent director and studio. Featured in Unzipped Magazine's The 100 Greatest Gay Adult Films Ever Made (2005).

=== 2000s ===
- DreamBoy (Max Lincoln, 2003) Eurocreme. Spawned a whole series of similarly titled films (for example, OfficeBoy, SpyBoy and RentBoy)
- Michael Lucas' Dangerous Liaisons (Michael Lucas, 2005) Lucas Entertainment is the biggest production by this director and studio. Variously described as a film adaptation of Les liaisons dangereuses (1782), and a remake of Dangerous Liaisons (1988).
- Dawson's 20 Load Weekend (Paul Morris, 2004) Treasure Island Media is a major production by this well-known director.
- Michael Lucas' La Dolce Vita (Michael Lucas, 2006) At a budget of $250,000, Lucas Entertainment claims it to be the most expensive gay porn film ever made. It contained celebrity cameos and attracted controversy with a lawsuit.

== See also ==
- Bara – Gay manga
- Bisexual pornography – Pornography depicting bisexuality
- Boyd McDonald – American writer and magazine publisher
- Boys' love – Fiction genre depicting male same-sex relationships
- David Hurles – American pornographer (1944–2023)
- Erotic literature – Literary genre
- Gay pulp fiction – Genre of pulp fiction literature
- Gay sex roles – Positions during sexual activity
- Gay sexual practices – Sexual activity between men
- List of actors in gay pornographic films
- Men who have sex with men – Behavioral category
- Sex industry – Field of business

== Further reading and information ==
=== Academic works ===
- Adams-Thies, Brian (July 2015). "Choosing the right partner means choosing the right porn: how gay porn communicates in the home". Porn Studies. 2 (2–3): 123–136. doi:10.1080/23268743.2015.1060007.
- Bronski, Michael (2003). Pulp friction: uncovering the golden age of gay male pulps. New York: St. Martin's Griffin. ISBN 9780312252670.
- Burger, John R. (1995). One-handed histories: the eroto-politics of gay male video pornography. New York: Haworth Press. ISBN 9781560238522.
- Cante, Richard C. (2008), "Chapters 4, 5 and 6", in Cante, Richard C. (ed.), Gay men and the forms of contemporary US culture, Burlington, Vermont: Ashgate Publishing, ISBN 9780754672302.
- Delany, Samuel R. (1999). Times Square Red, Times Square Blue. New York: New York University Press. ISBN 9780814719206.
- Dyer, Richard (Spring 1994). "Idol thoughts: orgasm and self-reflexivity in gay pornography". Critical Quarterly. 36 (1): 49–62. doi:10.1111/j.1467-8705.1994.tb01012.x.
- Dyer, Richard (2002) [1992], "Coming to terms: gay pornography", in Dyer, Richard (ed.), Only entertainment (2nd ed.), New York: Routledge, pp. 138–150, ISBN 9780415254977.
- Eisenberg, Daniel (1990), "Pornography (definition)", in Dynes, Wayne R.; Johansson, Warren; Percy, William A; Donaldson, Stephen (eds.), Encyclopedia of homosexuality, Garland reference library of social science 492, New York: Garland Pub, pp. 1023–1028, ISBN 9781558621473, OCLC 835916402. Pdf. Abridged pdf.
- Kendall, Christopher N. (2004). Gay male pornography: an issue of sex discrimination. Vancouver, British Columbia, Canada: UBC Press. ISBN 9780774851152.
- Kendall, Christopher N.; Funk, Rus Ervin (January 2004). "Gay male pornography's "actors": when "fantasy" isn't". Journal of Trauma Practice. 2 (3–4): 93–114. doi:10.1300/J189v02n03_05. S2CID 141304973.
- Kendall, Christopher N. (2011), "The harms of gay male pornography", in Tankard Reist, Melinda; Bray, Abigail (eds.), Big Porn Inc.: exposing the harms of the global pornography industry, North Melbourne, Victoria: Spinifex Press, pp. 53–62, ISBN 9781876756895.
- Moore, Patrick (2004). Beyond shame: reclaiming the abandoned history of radical gay sexuality. Boston: Beacon Press. ISBN 9780807079577.
- Morrison, Todd G. (2004). Eclectic views on gay male pornography: pornucopia. Binghamton, New York: Harrington Park Press. ISBN 9781560232919.
- Neville, Lucy (July 2015). "Male gays in the female gaze: women who watch m/m pornography" (PDF). Porn Studies. 2 (2–3): 192–207. doi:10.1080/23268743.2015.1052937. Archived from the original (PDF) on February 16, 2021.
- Ryberg, Ingrid (July 2015). "Carnal fantasizing: embodied spectatorship of queer, feminist and lesbian pornography". Porn Studies. 2 (2–3): 161–173. doi:10.1080/23268743.2015.1059012.
- Slade, Joseph W. (2001). Pornography and sexual representation: a reference guide. Westport, Connecticut: Greenwood Press. ISBN 9780313315213.
- Stevenson, Jack (Fall 1997). "From the bedroom to the bijou: a secret history of American gay sex cinema". Film Quarterly. 51 (1): 24–31. doi:10.2307/1213528. JSTOR 1213528.
- Thomas, Joe A. (2000). "Gay male video pornography: past, present, and future". In Weitzer, Ronald (ed.). Sex for sale: prostitution, pornography, and the sex industry. New York: Routledge. pp. 49–66. ISBN 9780415922951.
- Waugh, Thomas; Walker, Willie (2004). Lust unearthed: vintage gay graphics from the DuBek collection. Vancouver, British Columbia, Canada: Arsenal Pulp Press. ISBN 9781551521657.
- Waugh, Thomas (1996). Hard to imagine: gay male eroticism in photography and film from their beginnings to Stonewall. New York: Columbia University Press. ISBN 9780231099981.
- Williams, Linda (2004). Porn studies. Durham, North Carolina: Duke University Press. ISBN 9780822333128.

=== Biographies ===
- Edmonson, Roger (2000). Clone: The Life and Legacy of Al Parker, Gay Superstar. Alyson Books. ISBN 978-1-55583-529-3.
- Edmonson, Roger; Jerry Douglas (1998). Boy in the Sand: Casey Donovan, All-American Sex Star. Alyson Books. ISBN 978-1-55583-457-9.
- Isherwood, Charles (1996). Wonder Bread & Ecstasy : The Life and Death of Joey Stefano. Alyson Books. ISBN 978-1-55583-383-1.
- Larue, Chi Chi; John Erich (1997). Making It Big: Sex Stars, Porn Films and Me. Alyson Publications. ISBN 978-1-55583-392-3.

=== Documentaries ===
- Beyond Vanilla (Claes Lilja, 2001)
- Gay Sex in the 70s. (Joseph F. Lovett, 2005)
- That Man: Peter Berlin. (Jim Tushinski, 2005)
- Island. (Ryan Sullivan, 2010)
