= Jean-Daniel Cadinot =

French photographer, director and producer

Jean Daniel Cadinot
- Cadinot in 2007
- Born: 10 February 1944; Paris, France
- Died: 23 April 2008 (aged 64)
- Other names: Tony Darcq, Tony Dark
- Website: http://www.cadinot.fr

Jean Daniel Cadinot (10 February 1944 – 23 April 2008) was a French photographer, and director/producer of gay pornographic films. His photography focused on homoerotic imagery, and his films are noted for their emphasis on plot and realism.

== Biography ==
Cadinot was born during World War II, in German-occupied Paris, in the Montmartre hill area of the Batignolles Quarter. His parents were tailors who custom fit clothes. Cadinot later remarked that while his parents had clothed men, he earned his reputation for undressing them.

As a teenager, Cadinot hoped to become a painter and, due to parental opposition, ran away from home at the age of 17. In the early 1960s, he studied at École des Arts et Métiers and at the National School of Photography. He then began his professional career at Valois Studios, where he directed mainstream films for French-speaking audiences.

He first pursued a career in photography, which took on a homosexual angle with his nude portrait of writer Yves Navarre and singer Patrick Juvet. His erotic photographs appeared in the first edition of Gai Pied. He began to sell nude photographs and finally moved to directing movies in 1978. By then, he had published 17 photo albums, with total sales of over 170,000 copies.

Setting up his own production company, French Art, Cadinot made dozens of 16 mm films.

Characteristic of Cadinot's films was an emphasis on plot, much more so than in typical porn films. His plots were often based originally on incidents from his own life, but he was known for adjusting the plot during filming to incorporate experiences of his actors. He insisted on realism in his films, especially in sex scenes, saying that the actors "do not portray things that are imposed on them by me, but things they like to do themselves".

By 1998, he had directed fifty-four films, some under the pseudonym Tony Dark.

In 2004, he won a FICEB HeatGay Award for Best Director (Les secrets de famille - French Art).

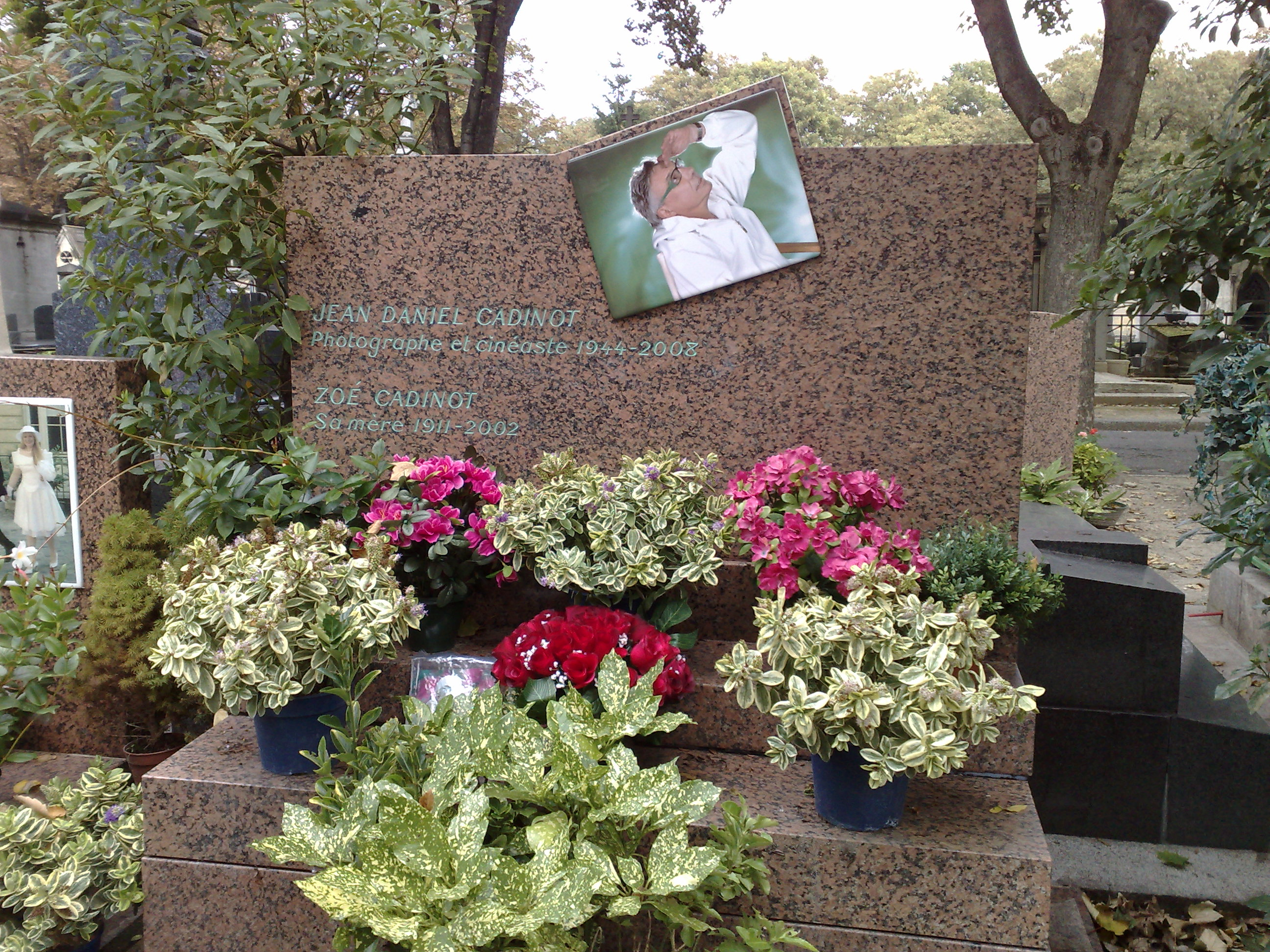
Cadinot's grave in Montmartre Cemetery

On 23 April 2008, Cadinot died of a heart attack. After his death, the company French Art was headed by François Orenn, a classically trained pianist who started working for Cadinot as a score composer and who managed the company from 2002. Two unfinished films by Cadinot, Subversion and Le Culte d'Eros, have since been released. Orenn also began directing films of his own in Cadinot's style (Anges et Démons and L'Avarice) and with Cadinot's technical crew.

In 2013, StudioPresse and PinkTv jointly acquired the Cadinot trademark and exclusive distribution rights on all Cadinot movies, including previously unreleased material. The website "Cadinot.fr" is owned by StudioPresse, which is known to own other gay labels such Jnrc, Citebeur, GayArabClub etc.

In October 2023, Editions Hors-Champ published a book of over a hundred black-and-white and colour photographs taken by Jean-Daniel Cadinot between 1970 and 2005. The editorial project is designed around a bilingual (French-English) biographical note, also illustrated with documents from the family archives.

== Partial filmography ==
Filmography

- 1980
  - Tendres Adolescents
  - Stop
  - Hommes De Chantier
- 1981
  - Garçons De Rêves
  - Scouts
- 1982
  - Aime... Comme Minet
  - Garçons De Plage
- 1983
  - Sacré Collège
  - Age Tendre et Sexes Droits
  - Charmants Cousins
- 1984
  - Les Minets Sauvages
  - Stop Surprise
- 1985
  - Classe De Neige
  - Top Models
- 1986
  - Le voyage a Venise
  - Sous Le Signe De L'Etalon
- 1987
  - Chaleurs
  - Deuxième Sous-sol
  - Escalier de Service
- 1988
  - Pension Complète
  - Séance Particulière
- 1989
  - Crash Toujours
- 1990
  - Service Actif génial
  - Le Coursier
- 1991
  - Service Actif II
- 1992
  - Gamins De Paris
- 1993
  - Tequila
  - Corps D'Elite
- 1994
  - Maurice et Les Garçons
  - Musée Hom
  - Paradisio Inferno
- 1995
  - Garçons D'Etage
- 1996
  - Pressbook
  - Coup De Soleil
  - Désirs Volés
  - Garçons D'Etage II
- 1997
  - Techno Boys
- 1998
  - État D'Urgence
  - Macadam
  - Sortie De Secours
- 1999
  - Squat
  - Safari City
  - S.O.S.
- 2000
  - C'est La Vie
  - Double En Jeu
  - Sans Limite
- 2002
  - Cours Privés
  - Mon Ami, Mes Amants
- 2003
  - Crescendo
- 2004
  - Secrets de Famille
  - Hammam
- 2005
  - Plaisirs D'Orient
- 2006
  - Les Portes du Desir
  - Princes Pervers
- 2007
  - Tentations de Sodome
  - Parfums Erotiques
  - Trésors secrets
- 2008
  - Duos de Choc
  - Subversion (posthumous)
- 2009
  - Le Culte d'Eros (posthumous)

== See also ==
- List of male performers in gay porn films
- List of pornographic movie studios

Awards
Preceded by Chi Chi LaRue as Taylor Hudson for The Rise	AVN Awards for Best Director-Gay Video for The Traveling Journeymen (Le Désir en Ballade); 1992	Succeeded by Chi Chi LaRue for Songs in the Key of Sex
