= Sam Coppola =

American actor

- Born: July 31, 1932; Jersey City, New Jersey, U.S.
- Died: February 5, 2012 (aged 79); Leonia, New Jersey, U.S.
- Occupation: Actor
- Years active: 1968–2012

Sam Coppola (July 31, 1932 – February 5, 2012) was an American character actor of stage, film, and television, appearing in more than 35 films and nearly 40 television shows, since 1968.

== Education ==
Coppola was an alumnus of the Lee Strasberg acting studio.

== Career ==
Coppola's film roles include, a Cop (uncredited) in Serpico (1973), Dan Fusco, owner of the hardware and paint store who gave John Travolta's character Tony Manero advice in Saturday Night Fever (1977), and Fuselli in Fatal Attraction (1987).

On television, Coppola's appearances include roles in the series Ryan's Hope (1975-76), The Equalizer (1986), The Practice (1997), The Wire (2006), The Good Wife (2011), and on shows in the Law & Order franchise.

On The Sopranos (1999), Coppola made a brief appearance as the idiosyncratic family therapist of Jennifer Melfi.

In the 2001 A&E television movie The Big Heist, Coppola portrayed mob boss Paul Castellano.

Coppola played a nursing home resident in a Chevy commercial that aired during 2011's Super Bowl and a hot dog vendor in a Ball Park Franks spot starring Michael Jordan.

On stage, Coppola portrayed Aaronow, an aging real estate salesman in a 2000 production of Glengarry Glen Ross at McCarter Theatre in Princeton, NJ, and in a 2005 off-Broadway production of Waiting for Godot he portrayed the hobo Vladimir.

== Personal life ==
Coppola resided in Leonia, New Jersey for 38-years. He was predeceased by his wife, and survived by two children, Jason and Samantha, and by three grandchildren.

Sam Coppola is not related to Francis Ford Coppola, the film director.

== Death ==
Coppola died February 5, 2012, from an aneurysm.

== Filmography ==
=== Film ===
- No Way to Treat a Lady (1968) – Customer (uncredited)
- Interplay (1970) – Mel
- The Anderson Tapes (1971) – Private Detective
- The Gang That Couldn't Shoot Straight (1971) – Julie
- Serpico (1973) – Cop (uncredited)
- Crazy Joe (1974) – Chick
- Death Journey (1976) – Detective Johnson
- Saturday Night Fever (1977) – Dan Fusco
- Fingers (1978) – Sam
- King of the Gypsies (1978) – (uncredited)
- Without a Trace (1983) – Schoyer
- Fatal Attraction (1987) – Fuselli
- Zits (1988) – Principal
- Blue Steel (1989) – PBA Representative
- She's Back (1989) – Det. Brophy
- Street Hunter (1990) – Jannelli
- Jacob's Ladder (1990) – Taxi Driver
- A Kiss Before Dying (1991) – Detective Michaelson
- Joey Breaker (1993) – Sid Kramer
- Money for Nothing (1993) – Bartender Lindey
- Palookaville (1995) – Mr. Kott, Money Truck Driver
- The Deli (1997) – Mr. Bishop
- A Wake in Providence (1999) – Uncle Joe
- Blue Moon (2000) – Bill
- Sally (2000) – Dr. Felch
- Friends & Family (2001) – Carlo Ricci
- Empire (2002) – Bobby Gold
- Nola (2003) – Gus
- True Crime: New York City (2005) – Additional voices
- Heavy Petting (2007) – Old Codger #1
- House of Satisfaction (2008) – Barry
- Reunion (2009) – Max
- Run It (2009) – Vinny
- Driving Me Crazy (2012) – Larry Petterson

=== Television ===
Sam Coppola television credits
Year	Title	Role	Notes
1975–1976	Ryan's Hope	Angie	4 episodes
1986	The Equalizer	Frank Polinski	Episode: "Shades of Darkness"
1991	Law & Order	Bartender	Episode: "Reunciation"
1997	The Practice	Carl Mazone	Episode: "The Blessing"
1998	Witness to the Mob	Judge Leo Glasser	TV movie
1999	The Sopranos	Dr. Reise	1 episode
2001	The Big Heist	Paul Castellano	TV movie. A&E
2001	Law & Order: Special Victims Unit	Uncle Sammy	Episode: "Paranoia"
2002	Law & Order: Criminal Intent	Neal Dornan	Episode: "The Pilgrim"
2004	Law & Order	US Federal Judge Vance	Episode: "City Hall"
2006	The Wire	Former Mayor "Young Tony"	2 episodes
2011	The Good Wife	Merrick	1 episode
