= Mutant Hunt =

1987 film

- Poster
- Directed by: Tim Kincaid
- Starring: Rick Gianasi
- Release date: 1987
- Language: English

Mutant Hunt is a 1987 direct-to-video American action science fiction film written and directed by Tim Kincaid.

== Plot ==
Set in New York in 1992 (the near future at the time of the film's release), the plot involves a bounty hunter who chases mutant cyborgs to prevent them from killing humans.

== Cast ==
- Rick Gianasi as Matt Riker
- Bill Peterson (not to be confused with Bill Paterson) as Z.
- Mark Umile as Paul Haynes
- Mary Fahey as Darla Haynes

== Production ==
Tim Kincaid first encountered Charles Band at the American Film Market as the former attempted to sell his independently produced film Bad Girls Dormitory. While Band ultimately passed on acquiring Bad Girls Dormitory, he did tell Kincaid to show him any future projects he was developing. Upon his return to New York, Kinccaid and his wife/producer Cynthia DePaula went over the various projects they'd developed and sent the material to Band who invited the two back to California with band acquiring Rapists from Outer Space (which would eventually become Breeders) and Mutant Hunt which would be shot back-to-back.

== Release ==
The film was released straight to video on October 28, 1987, in the United States but was theatrically released in Europe (under the title Robot Killer, in France). In January of the same year, another film by Kincaid, Robot Holocaust had received a direct-to-video release in the United States. The same year he would also release Riot on 42nd St. and Maximum Thrust (later renamed The Occultist or Waldo Warren, Private Dick Without a Brain), another film featuring Rick Gianasi.

== Reception ==
A mixed recent retrospective review of the film states that "The film’s noticeable lack of budget hampered the proceedings. The film uses minimal locations, the acting leaves plenty of room for improvement, and the story lacks the scope of the ideas it wants to explore. Mutant Hunt had the right idea, and some of the practical makeup effects are solid, including a mutant with its jaw detached." Another recent review was much more negative: "Low-budget horror has its fans, but some efforts really push the limits of human endurance with inept writing, dreadful acting, and low-rent special effects. Mutant Hunt is remarkable in its ability to check all those boxes in a 77-minute excursion into the absurd." In a similar manner, another review comments: "At times, it seems fairly obvious that Director Tim Kincaid is a fan of the Terminator franchise, and the film seems to be a late-to-the-draw attempt at cashing in on its popularity. Some of the costuming is unintentionally hilarious and serves to distract rather than build the cyberpunk setting that was likely intended. Unfortunately, Kincaid’s history as a porn director seems to leak through into his film."
