= She's Back (film) =

1989 American film

- Poster
- Directed by: Tim Kincaid
- Written by: Buddy Giovinazzo
- Produced by: Cynthia De Paula
- Starring: Carrie Fisher; Robert Joy
- Cinematography: Arthur D. Marks
- Edited by: Mary Hickey
- Music by: Jimmie Haskell
- Production companies: Lightning Pictures; Tycin Entertainment
- Distributed by: Vestron Pictures
- Release date: July 7, 1989
- Country: United States
- Language: English

She's Back is a 1989 American comedy horror film directed by Tim Kincaid. It stars Carrie Fisher in the main role.

== Plot ==
During an assault on their house in Queens, Beatrix is murdered. To obtain vengeance, she comes back from the afterlife to visit her husband Paul.

== Cast ==
- Carrie Fisher as Beatrix (Bea)
- Robert Joy as Paul
- Matthew Cowles as S. Bloom
- Joel Swetow as Razorface
- Sam Coppola as Detective Brophy

== Production ==
The fact that Fisher, a well-known actress thanks to her starring role in the Star Wars franchise, accepted to play in this low-budget film has attracted considerable attention. The film's working title was 'Dead and Married'.

== Release and reception ==
A retrospective very negative review recalls the release history of the film: "This anemic comedy, which bore the more descriptive working title 'Dead and Married', played Miami cinemas in the summer of 1989 before sailing into the Bermuda Triangle of lost films. The video-releasing company folded, and She's Back languished in limbo until LIVE Home Video brought it out on tape in late 1991." Another review finds that She's Back is a black comedy and that it is "(u)neven, but occasionally funny."
