= Big Guns (1987 film) =

- Directed by: William Higgins
- Written by: William Higgins
- Starring: Mike Henson; Kevin Williams; Chad Douglas; Chris Gray; Jeff Boote; Jeff Quinn; John Davenport; John Rocklin; Kevin Wiles; Mike Ryan
- Cinematography: William Higgins
- Edited by: Chet Thomas; Mark Steele; Marc Fredrics
- Music by: Costello Presley
- Distributed by: Catalina Video
- Release date: 1987
- Running time: 104 minutes 122 minutes

Big Guns is a 1987 gay pornographic film produced by the Laguna Pacific studio and distributed by Catalina Video.

The cast included Mike Henson, Kevin Williams, Chad Douglas, Chris Gray, Jeff Boote, Jeff Quinn, John Davenport, John Rocklin, Kevin Wiles, and Mike Ryan.

== Cast ==
- Mike Henson
- Kevin Williams
- Chad Douglas
- Chris Gray
- Jeff Boote
- Jeff Quinn
- John Davenport
- John Rocklin
- Kevin Wiles
- Mike Ryan

== Released ==
The film was re-released on DVD in 2007 as "Big Guns: 20th Anniversary Edition" and was remastered, color corrected and restored with its original ending cut from the original feature film. The 20th anniversary version runs 122 minutes.

== Sequel ==
A sequel, "Hot Rods: The Young and the Hung Part 2," was shot concurrently and released the following year. "Big Guns" ends with a cliff-hanger scene that plays out as the first scene in "Hot Rods." (Although "Hot Rods" is subtitled "The Young and the Hung Part 2" it is not a sequel to the 1985 William Higgins film "The Young and the Hung" starring Brian Estevez, Christopher Lance, Francois Papillon, Grant Fagan, J.T. Denver, Jim Erickson, Ken Kerns, Michael Gere, Terry Evans, Tex Anthony and Troy Ramsey). The unofficial sequel "Big Guns 2" was made in 1998.

== Awards and nominations ==
- 1987 X-Rated Critics Organization winner of Best Film.
- 2002 Grabby Awards winner of Best Classic.
- 2005 GayVN Awards winner of Best Classic Gay Film.
