= Monica Majoli =

American artist (born 1963)

- Born: 1963 (age 62–63); Los Angeles, California, U.S.
- Education: University of California, Los Angeles
- Known for: Painting, drawing, queer art
- Notable work: Rubbermen series, Black Mirror series
- Style: Realism
- Website: monicamajoli.com

Monica Majoli (born 1963) is an American artist whose artwork examines the relationship between physicality and consciousness expressed through the documentary sexual image. Her work explores intimacy through sexuality, and some aspects of alternative lifestyles such as BDSM.

== Early life and education ==
Majoli earned her BA (1989) MFA (1992) from the University of California, Los Angeles, where she focused primarily on painting and drawing, developing a process-based, time-intensive approach which result in discreet bodies of work. She is a Professor of Art in Painting and Graduate Studies at the University of California, Irvine. She has also taught at UC Berkeley and the Graduate Studies program at Yale University School of Art.

== Career ==
=== Early works (1990-1998) ===
According to the Whitney Museum of American Art, Majoli's "figurative paintings from the early 1990s to the present have depicted scenes of sexual fetishism." Majoli's work Investigates "themes and rituals of identity, intimacy, and mortality" and "is both a site for catharsis and an admission of its irresolution." In her early works, she focused on oil painting on panel indebted to European painting of the 16th to 19th centuries in a method of layering binder and oil paint developed in Northern Renaissance painting. She used this method and style to create highly detailed and realistic homoerotic scenes and depictions of her own body. These explicit paintings are said to be less so a focus on the physical experience itself than on the psychological aspects and consequences of these acts.

In an interview with Paulina McFarland for Art XX Magazine, Majoli stated, "My use of sexuality revolves around the desire to stimulate a visceral response in the viewer to the actualities of our physical nature. SM, which has been the dominant form of sexuality that I employ visually, is useful to me, as it highlights the psychological nature of sexuality and consciousness." These works reference both her own sexuality and sexuality in general, including a life-size portrait of the artist holding a dildo, while a possible reference to Linda Benglis' 1974 Artforum Ad, Majoli's depiction is intimate and personal.

=== Rubbermen (1999-2007) ===
Her Rubberman series was featured in the 2006 Whitney Biennial and the 2006 Berlin Biennial of Contemporary Art at KW Institute of Contemporary Art, The Museum of Modern Art, New York, the Whitney Museum of American Art, New York, the Hammer Museum, Los Angeles, the Getty Research Institute, Los Angeles and the Los Angeles County Museum of Art, Los Angeles all include works from the Rubbermen series in their permanent collections.

This series consists of watercolor paintings depicting scenes of men in latex rubber, many of them bound in rope and/or chains. The concept was derived from the magazine Rubber Rebel published in Los Angeles in the mid-1990s and bondage discipline magazines and product catalogs from the period of production. Her stylized depictions of fetish based sexual activity alludes to sex as a tool, rather than a curiosity. The tonal palette and ethereal nature of wet-in-wet watercolor allow for the exploration of a deeper consciousness in relation to sexuality and the complications of intimacy.

=== Black Mirror (2009-2014) ===
In the Black Mirror series, Majoli paints in a tenebrous style reminiscent of Caravaggio and Georges de La Tour. The idea itself came from the floor to ceiling black mirrors encircling the walls of the master bedroom of her Los Angeles home, originally installed in the 1970s by a previous owner. Black Mirror, includes portraits of women that Majoli had relationships with over a 25-year period, "their profiles drawn in close-up in colored pencil, forming a chiaroscuro effect on the sheets of black paper." The "polished nocturnal portraits" are made from photographs Majoli took of the women positioned in front of the black mirrors, and according to Majoli, "The otherworldly half-image that is reflected by black mirror coincides with both the internal state of desire and a crisis in belief in representational painting. In these works, the surface itself holds the fetishistic power, rather than the act depicted." Through the conjuring of absence, the work also explores the separation from her Italian father (a lithographer based in Milan, who inspired her to use lithography in the non-representational component of the series). The dark tonality of the palette is used to obscure the women, as if fading away from distance. Black Mirror (Kate), 2010-2012 is in the permanent collection of the Museum of Modern Art, San Francisco.

== Recent work ==
Blueboys is a body of watercolor paintings Majoli began in 2015 from images culled from the first National gay magazine, blueboy, published in Florida from 1974-2007 by Don Westbrook (Donald N. Embinder) which Majoli is examining as a metaphor for gay liberation and self-realization prefiguring the AIDS epidemic.

== Exhibitions ==
| 2016 | "Coming to Power: 25 Years of X-Plicit Art by Women", Maccarone | New York City, NY |
| 2009 | "Compass in Hand: Selections from The Judith Rothschild Foundation Contemporary Drawing Collection", Museum of Modern Art | New York City, NY |
| 2009 | "Everywhere: Sexual Diversity Policies in Art," Centro Galego de Arte Contemporanea | Spain |
| 2007 | "Eden's Edge: 15 L.A. Artists," the Hammer Museum | Los Angeles, CA |
| 2006 | "Into Me/Out of Me," P.S. 1 Contemporary Art Center | New York City, NY |
| 2002 | "Supereal" Marella Arte Contemporanea | Milan, Italy |
| 2002 | "LA Post-Cool," San Jose Museum of Art | San Jose, California |
| 1997 | "Scene of the Crime," the Hammer Museum | Los Angeles, CA |
| 1995 | "In a Different Light," Berkeley Art Museum | Berkeley, California |

Solo Exhibitions
| Air de Paris, France | 1995, 2007, 2010, 2014 | |
| L&M Arts, Los Angeles, CA | 2012 | |
| Gagosian Gallery | New York City, NY | 2006 |
| Feature, Inc. | 1998 | |
