= Kansas City Trucking Co. =

- Promotional theatrical poster
- Directed by: Tim Kincaid (as Joe Gage)
- Written by: Tim Kincaid (as Joe Gage)
- Produced by: Sam Gage
- Starring: Richard Locke; Steve Boyd; Jack Wrangler
- Music by: Al Steinman
- Distributed by: Joe Gage Films
- Release date: October 1976
- Running time: 67 minutes
- Country: United States
- Language: English

Kansas City Trucking Co. is a 1976 American gay pornographic film directed by Joe Gage. It is the first of the three films in Gage's "Working Man Trilogy", continuing with 1978's El Paso Wrecking Corp. and concluding with 1979's L.A. Tool & Die, and stars Richard Locke, Steve Boyd and Jack Wrangler.

== Cast ==
- Jack Wrangler as Jack
- Richard Locke as Hank
- Steve Boyd as Joe
- Maria Reina as Joe's Girl
- Dane Tremmel as Otis (as Dane Tremmell)
- Skip Sheppard as Billy
- Duff Paxton as Dan
- Bud Jaspar as Fred
- Kurt Williams as Desert Rat

== Production ==
The film was produced in San Francisco.

== Critical reception ==
The Advocate called the film "one of the hottest gay porns ever made. TLA Video's contemporary review was also highly favorable, citing it as one of the most influential gay porn films.

== DVD release ==
The films comprising the "Working Man Trilogy" were restored and released on DVD by HIS Video.
