= Kip Noll =

American gay pornographic film actor-magazine model

Kip Noll, also spelt as Kip Knoll, is a former American gay pornographic film actor-magazine model, active in the 1970s and 1980s.

Noll, who was a lean-muscled, free-spirited surfer type, achieved iconic status in the newly liberated gay culture of the late 1970s and early 1980s.

== Career ==
Kip was introduced into the gay pornographic film industry by Larry Ginsburg (aka Mark Reynolds) in 1975, first appearing in a few silent film loops in 1977. Kip was cast as the supposed younger brother of actor Bob Noll, and rapidly became the popular "Noll".

Kip Noll on the cover of "The Kip Noll Story", 1978

He then became closely associated with director William Higgins, who directed him for the first time in The Boys of Venice Beach (1978), which was a blockbuster. After Kip's success, several other unrelated models were presented as his brothers— Jeff and Scott Noll as his younger siblings, and Marc Noll as his cousin (Chip Noll was introduced as Kip's nephew in later years).

By the early 1980s Noll had become one of the first superstars in the gay porn industry. Kip had made his first magazine appearance at the age of 22, and had two magazines devoted solely to him— "The Kip Noll Story" and "Kip Noll Cocky." The gay magazine Stallion published an in-depth interview with him in one of its early issues when it came out in 1982.

He was a regular performer at the "D.C. Follies", and had also performed at Eros Theatre in the Times Square area to promote his movie The Grease Monkeys (1979). He made his last porn movie in 1985, which he had financed himself.

== Legacy ==
Kip Noll is regarded as the first major twink pornstar, whose popularity paved the way for other twink performers.

Marc Almond has elegized Kip in his poem "Kip" in The Angel of Death in the Adonis Lounge (1988).

Steve Reinke's meta-porn work Lonely Boy (1993) from The 100 Videos series, which has the same name as the 1962 documentary on Paul Anka (which in turn was named after one of Anka's songs), and Nguyen Tan Hoang's experimental video K.I.P. (2001)— both contain excerpts of Kip's movies, Roomates (1980) and Kip Noll Superstar, Part I (1981), respectively.

J. C. Adams included Noll in his list of 100 most famous porn stars, in his book Gay Porn Heroes (2011), in The Blonds category. And in 2013, Matthew Rettenmund included him in his list of "History's 250 Greatest Gay-Porn Stars" on Boyculture.com at #48.

In October 2015, model Hugo Villanova posed for ODDA Magazine in a photo shoot titled Grease Monkey, which was inspired by Kip Noll.

== Personal life ==
Kip was brought up in New England and migrated to San Diego in the 70s, where he worked as a machinist and lived with his wife. He was "presumed to be straight", and had stated that his motivations for porn work were simply financial.

He is said to have dated porn actress Velvet Summers for some time.

Little is known for certain about Noll's life after his retirement in 1985. But it has been claimed that he died in 2001 at the age of 43.

== Videography ==
- The Best of Kip Noll (Catalina Video) with Derrick Stanton, Scott Taylor, Jack Burke, Jeremy Scott, Rick, Mark Brennan.
- Boys of Venice (Catalina Video) with Derrick Stanton, Scott Taylor, Eric Ryan, Emanuelle Bravos, Clay Russell, Butch McLester, Guy da Silva, Johnny Stone, Jimmy Young and Darla Lee.
- Brothers Should Do It (Catalina Video) with Jon King, J. W. King, Derrick Stanton, Jack Burke, Giorgio Canali, and Jamie Wingo. Directed by William Higgins.
- Catalina Orgies Vol. 2 (Catalina Video) with Tom Brock, Dean Chasen, Jay Hawkins, Eric Radford, Ricki Benson, Mark Scott Solo, Sergio Canali, Dan Ford, Larry Richards, Tim Richards, Perry Field, Ben Barker, Rob Stevens, Jim Taylor, Rick Brennan, Mike Brennen, Chris Henderson.
- Directors Best: William Higgins Vol. 2 (Catalina Video) with Emmanuelle Bravos, Rob Stevens, Jon King, Lee Marlin, Rick Lindley, Derrick Stanton, Guy DeSilva.
- For You #6 with the five Noll "brothers" in one movie: Bob Noll, Kip Noll, Jeff Noll, Mark Noll, Scott Noll, and Kourey Mitchell and Steve York.
- Kip Noll & the Westside Boys (Catalina Video) with Ben Barker, Rob Stevens, Jim Taylor, Rick Brennan, Mike Brennen, and Chris Henderson. Directed by William Higgins
- Kip Noll Superstar (Catalina Video) with Emanuelle Bravos, Rick & Mike Brennen, Jack Burke, Jeremy Scott, Derrick Stanton and Jon King.
- Try to Take It (Falcon Video Pac 51) with Guillermo, Dick Fisk, Frank, Todd Parker, Bill Eld.
- Wild Young Fuckers (Catalina Video) with John Rocklin, Jeff Quinn, Matt Ramsey, Scott Roberts, Paul Madison, Lance Whitman, Derrick Stanton, Michael Christopher, Mike Dean, Rick Kennedy, Mike Gibson, John Von Crouch, Sparky Ames, Bobby Madison, Giorgio Canali, Todd Johnson, Troy Richards, Steven Richards, Mike Henson, Kevin Williams and John Davenport. Directed by William Higgins.
- Young Men of the 80's Vol. 4 (Catalina Video) with Derrick Stanton.
- Class of 84 Directed by William Higgins.
- Cuming of Age
- Grease Monkeys
- Room Mates
- Pacific Coast Highway

== See also ==
- List of male performers in gay porn films
