= Awol Marines =

Awol Marines is a reality-based, military-themed, gay pornographic website launched in 2005 which houses more than 3,200 videos created by amateur American pornographer Bobby Garcia. In 2009, a mobile version of the site was launched.

== Background ==
Bobby Garcia first began making amateur pornography in the 1970s. During the 1990s, Bobby filmed thousands of U.S. marines at his home in Oceanside, CA. The videos available at Awol Marines are primarily drawn from this period, which was Bobby Garcia's most prolific. Most of the marines featured in the videos are heterosexual and were stationed at either the Camp Pendleton Marine Corps Base or the Marine Corps Air Ground Combat Center Twentynine Palms.

== Press ==
In the 2011 memoir Role Models, author and filmmaker John Waters devoted an entire chapter to Bobby Garcia. Waters described him as, "the Almodóvar of Anuses, the Buñuel of Blow Jobs, the Jodorowsky of Jerking Off."
