= Blueboy (magazine) =

American LGBT magazine

- Blueboy cover (January 1978)
- Editor: Donald Embinder
- Categories: Gay
- Frequency: Monthly
- First issue: June 1974
- Final issue: December 2007
- Country: United States
- Language: English
- Website: https://www.blueboy.com/
- ISSN: 0279-3733

Blueboy was a gay men's magazine with lifestyle and entertainment news, in addition to photos of nude or semi-nude men. It was published monthly from 1974 to 2007. The Detroit Free Press described the publication as "a full-color, slick gay version of Playboy magazine."

== History ==
Blueboy was originally a small black and white journal purchased in 1974 by publisher Donald N. Embinder. The former advertising manager for the arts magazine After Dark rebranded Blueboy as "The National Magazine About Men," which became the publication's longstanding tagline. The debut issue's cover parodied The Blue Boy by 18th-century painter Thomas Gainsborough.

Initially sold at adult bookstores and gay bars, the Miami-based magazine secured national distribution by its fourth issue. Regular features included lifestyle columns, celebrity interviews, film and music reviews, book excerpts, and articles on politics, gay rights, and gay popular culture. By 1978, monthly circulation reached 150,000 issues. Embinder characterized the readership as some of the "most sophisticated and affluent" people in the United States. Notable contributors and interviewees included Andy Warhol, Truman Capote, William S. Burroughs, Edmund White, John Rechy, Patricia Nell Warren, Christopher Isherwood, and Randy Shilts.

The publication's additional outreach included the gay pulp fiction series Blueboy Library. Blueboy Forum became the first weekly, live forum from a gay perspective beginning 25 October 1976, airing on WKID-TV in Hallandale, Florida, and as a late-night talk show on New York City's UHF Channel 68 (WBTB-TV).

Beginning in the 1990s, however, with competition from such gay publications including Out, MetroSource, and Genre, Blueboy focused much more on overt nude images, and jettisoned most of its non-pornographic content. The magazine's final issue was published in December 2007.

== Legacy and revival ==
In 2020, the Huntington Library in partnership with the Hammer Museum showcased Monica Majoli's series Blueboys, featuring centerfolds from the magazine by photographer Alex Sanchez. The exhibition included a new interview with Blueboy contributing artist Mel Odom and critical context by Miss Tiger, executive director of the Blueboy Archives and Cultural Arts Foundation.

The Blueboy Archives and Cultural Arts Foundation was founded in 2017 to preserve and contextualize the magazine archives, as well as other historical LGBTQ periodicals, books, films and ephemera. Blueboy will return as an annual magazine in February 2022.

== In popular culture ==
Singer Cyndi Lauper mentions the publication in the first lines of her song "She Bop":

Well, I see him every night in tight blue jeans
In the pages of a Blueboy magazine

== See also ==
- List of LGBT publications
