= Tim Kincaid =

American film director

- Born: Timothy Gambiani; July 2, 1944 (age 81); Santa Barbara, California
- Other names: Joe Gage; Mac Larsen
- Occupation(s): Film producer, film director, actor
- Years active: 1973–2017
- Spouse: Cynthia De Paula (divorced)
- Children: 2

Tim Kincaid (born Timothy Gambiani; July 2, 1944) is an American film director, film writer and film producer. As a pornographic director, Kincaid is often credited as Joe Gage.

== Career ==
Kincaid made his feature film debut in 1973 with the R-rated sexploitation The Female Response.

Following his debut, Kincaid transitioned to the adult entertainment industry using the pseudonym Joe Gage. Kincaid met producer Sam Gage (Sam Christensen) at a party and they formed a working film partnership. Their first three films - Kansas City Trucking Co. (1976), El Paso Wrecking Corp. (1978), and L.A. Tool & Die (1979) - became known as the Working Man Trilogy. The films earned accolades for replicating the narratives, characters, and drama of mainstream films within the gay porn film industry.

In the mid-eighties, Kincaid began making R-rated exploitation films starting with Bad Girls Dormitory. Following this film, he made four sci-fi/horror films for B-movie producer Charles Band: Breeders, Mutant Hunt, The Occultist, and most infamously Robot Holocaust. The latter was featured in an episode of Mystery Science Theater 3000 and released on Blu-ray by Scorpion Releasing. In addition, he produced Band's action thriller Enemy Territory in New York City and helmed the action film Riot on 42nd St. and the black comedy She's Back starring Carrie Fisher.

After a brief hiatus, Kincaid returned to the adult industry in 2001, again using the Joe Gage pseudonym.

== Perception ==
To a perceptive viewer some of the characters in Gage's films can be clearly understood as "gay identified", while others are just as clearly intended to represent bisexual men who normally inhabit the heterosexual world and may even be happily married. Many other characters—perhaps most of them—defy easy categorization, however. "I never went out of my way to emphasize the butch or straight attributes of my guys--I always sought to portray them as representatives of the average, ordinary, for the most part, working-class citizen."

For all of these reasons, Kincaid's aesthetic sensibilities had a significant impact not only on his contemporaries in the adult film world but on gay-male culture as it was developing in the 1970s and 1980s. "He's... the first artist who dared to suggest that sex between men was more about camaraderie than romance, more about hot action than a lifestyle. While his characters were always working-class Joes, his 1970s epics became blueprints of sexual tension-building and were also stylistically innovative." Numerous filmmakers of today cite the Gage films as being highly instrumental in their own development, and one gay singer-songwriter (Mark Weigle, on Soul/Sex) used the phrase "a Joe Gage face" in his lyrics, knowing that for some listeners it would immediately evoke a certain kind of male handsomeness, in much the same way that "Gibson Girl" brings to mind a specific type of feminine beauty. "The "Gage Men", as they were known during the heyday of the 1970s, appeared more sexy Average Joe than Abercrombie & Fitch. They tended toward "the hairy and the hunky".

== Awards ==
- 2001 GayVN Awards Hall of Fame
- 2011 XBIZ Award - Gay Director of the Year

== See also ==
- Category:Films directed by Tim Kincaid
- List of male performers in gay porn films
