= William Higgins (director) =

American pornographic film director

William Higgins, also known as "Wim Hof" (December 19, 1942 – December 21, 2019), was an American independent director of gay pornographic films who had been operating in the Czech Republic since 1996.

== Biography ==
Higgins started his career as a porn director and producer in Fort Lauderdale, Florida, when sellers of pornographic movies, including Falcon refused to mail them to customers in many southeastern states for legal reasons. In addition, he said in an interview, that gay porn movies were "so bad" that he decided to begin making them himself. In 1978, he was busted and his premises raided. Although the charges were later dropped, Higgins decided to go on a "world tour" looking for a better legal environment for his films. After rejecting Australia and Thailand as new venues, he settled in Amsterdam, where his distributor was, and later relocated to Prague, a less expensive city. Although the legal climate in the U.S. has changed, he had no interest in returning. He admittedly moved to Prague because male actors are more flexible (such as straight men willing to go gay for money), but saw the rise of internet porn as the end of the traditional gay porn production studio.

His first film, A Married Man, was produced in 1974. He went on to produce over 140 internationally distributed titles. His films won several Grabby Awards and he is in the GayVN Awards Hall of Fame. He was also the founder of the film production company Catalina Video.

Higgins died on December 21, 2019, of a heart attack.

== Awards and nominations ==
- 1984 Gay Producers Association winner of Special Achievement Award for "Sailor in the Wild 1".
- 1985 X-Rated Critics Organization winner of Best Depiction of Safe Sex for "The Young & the Hung".
- 2000 Grabby Awards nomination for Best International Video and Best Videograph.
- 2000 Grabby Awards winner of Best Classic DVD.
- 2003 Grabby Awards winner of Best Classic DVD.

== Selected filmography ==
- 1974 A Married Man
- 1978 Boys of Venice
- 1979 Kip Noll and the Westside Boys
- 1980 Boys of San Francisco
- 1980 Class of '84: Boys of Venice Go to College
- 1981 Pacific Coast Highway
- 1981 Brothers Should Do It
- 1981 Class of '84 2: The Adventure Continues
- 1982 Buster Goes to Laguna
- 1983 Cousins
- 1983 Sailor in the Wild
- 1984 Frat House Memories
- 1985 Pizza Boy: He Delivers
- 1985 Young and the Hung
- 1987 Big Guns
- 1988 William Higgins – Screen Test
- 1989 Down Under
- 1990 Catalina Orgies
- 1991 Sex in the Great Outdoors
- 1992 Frat Pack
- 1997 Wim Hof's Rough Cut (as Wim Hof)
- 1997 Puda: The Attic (as Wim Hof)
- 1998 Sex in the Can
- 1999 Double Czech (as Wim Hof)
- 2001 Prague Buddies 3: Liebestod
- 2001 The Jan Dvorak Story
- 2001 The Seven Deadly Sins: Wrath (as Wim Hof)
- 2002 Hard Day's
- 2003 Kick Club
- 2005 Inside Jirka Gregor
- 2006 Weapon of Mass Attraction
- 2007 Load Warriors
- 2008 Bjorn Free
- 2009 Exploring Rudolf Schneider
- 2009 Double Czech 2009
