= Fetish club =

Adult-only sex club

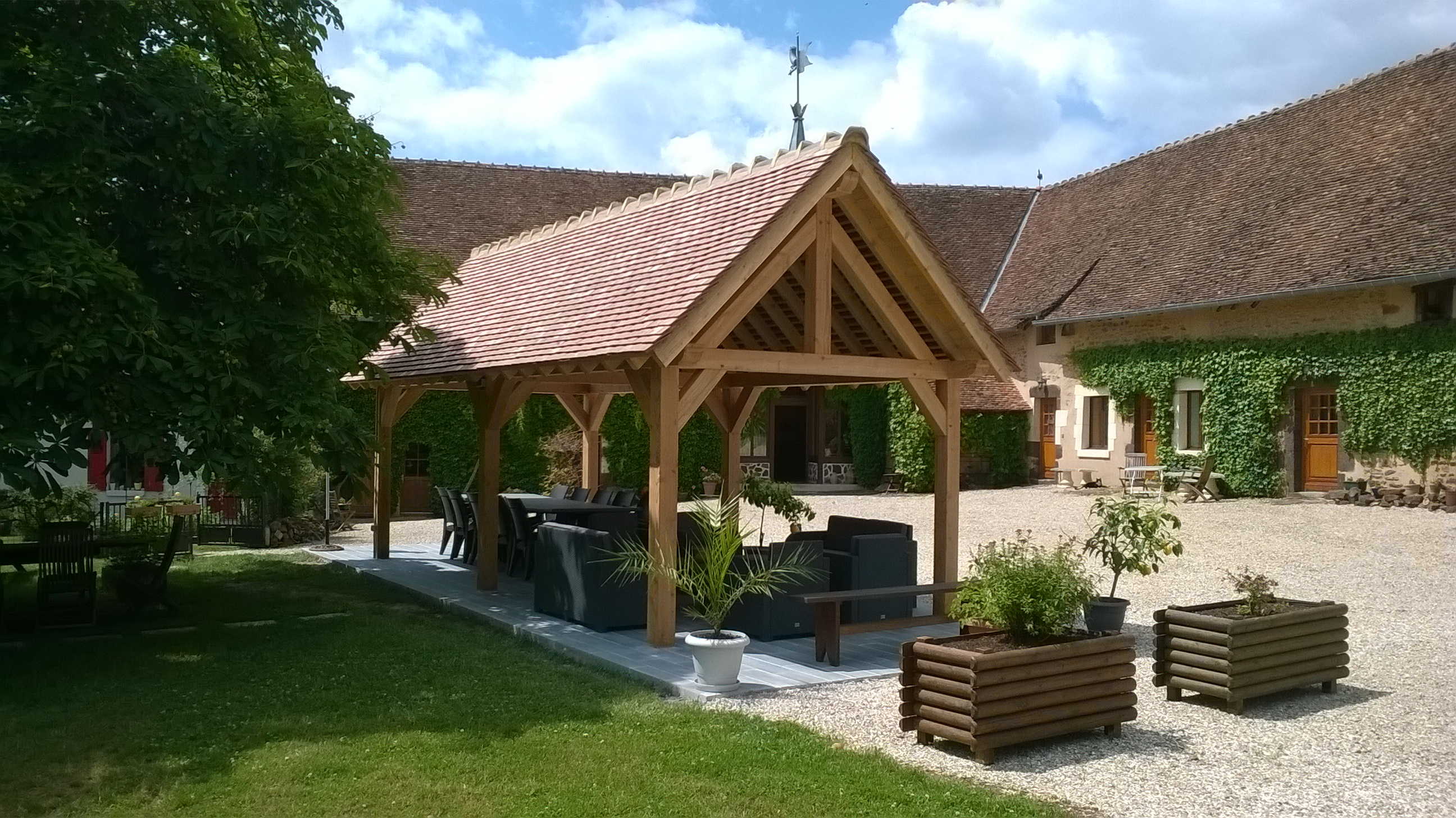
La Fistinière, a fetish club in Assigny, France

A fetish club is a nightclub, bar, social club or other entertainment hub which caters to clientele interested in some of (but not necessarily all) fetish fashion, bondage, dominance/submission, and/or sadism and masochism (BDSM). Some clubs have active "play" going on inside the club while others are a socialising place for like-minded people. Fetish Community events take place at specialty fare hosted at other public venues and night clubs.

Activities at fetish clubs have been interpreted as "neo-burlesque, freak show, queer and body mutation styles". The fetish club as carnival represents a rejection of "official" world views.

== See also ==
- List of universities with BDSM clubs
- Play party (BDSM)
- Munch (BDSM)
- Sex club
- LGBTQ sex clubs
