= Fisting =

Sex act

Fisting (also known as fist fucking (FF) and handballing) is a sexual activity that involves inserting one or more hands into the rectum (anal fisting) or the vagina (vaginal fisting). Fisting may be performed on oneself (self-fisting) or performed on one person by another. People who engage in fisting are often called "fisters".

Fisters have developed a distinct subculture with its own history, norms, and values, including literature and clubs for sexual, social, and spiritual exploration.

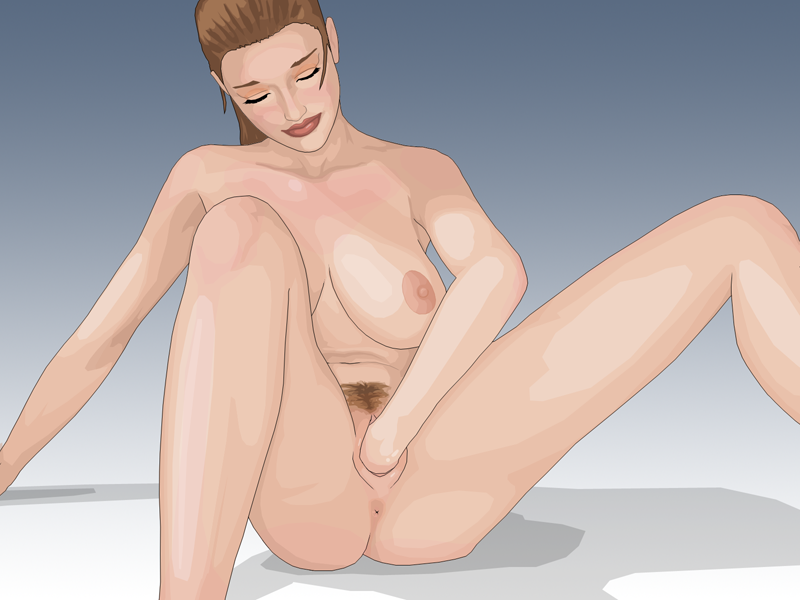
Vaginal self-fisting

== History ==
Fisting's emergence as a sexual practice is commonly attributed to gay male culture. However, its precise origin is disputed. Some claim fisting began in the twentieth century, whereas others assert the practice dates back to the eighteenth century or earlier. Sex educator Robert Morgan Lawrence, for example, claimed the practice dates back thousands of years.

Fisting gained visibility and popularity around the time of the gay liberation movement. Whereas until the 1960s fisting was generally confined to the bedroom, by 1969 men openly engaged in fisting at gay bathhouses such as St. Mark's Baths in New York. The hanky code and personal advertisements allowed fisters to safely and discreetly signal their interest to potential partners around the world. By 1973, gay bars, bathhouses and clubs such as the Red Star Saloon in South of Market, San Francisco were publicly advertising fisting. Sex clubs dedicated to fisting quickly emerged, including the Catacombs (the most famous fisting club in the world), Handball Express, and Red Hanky Express.

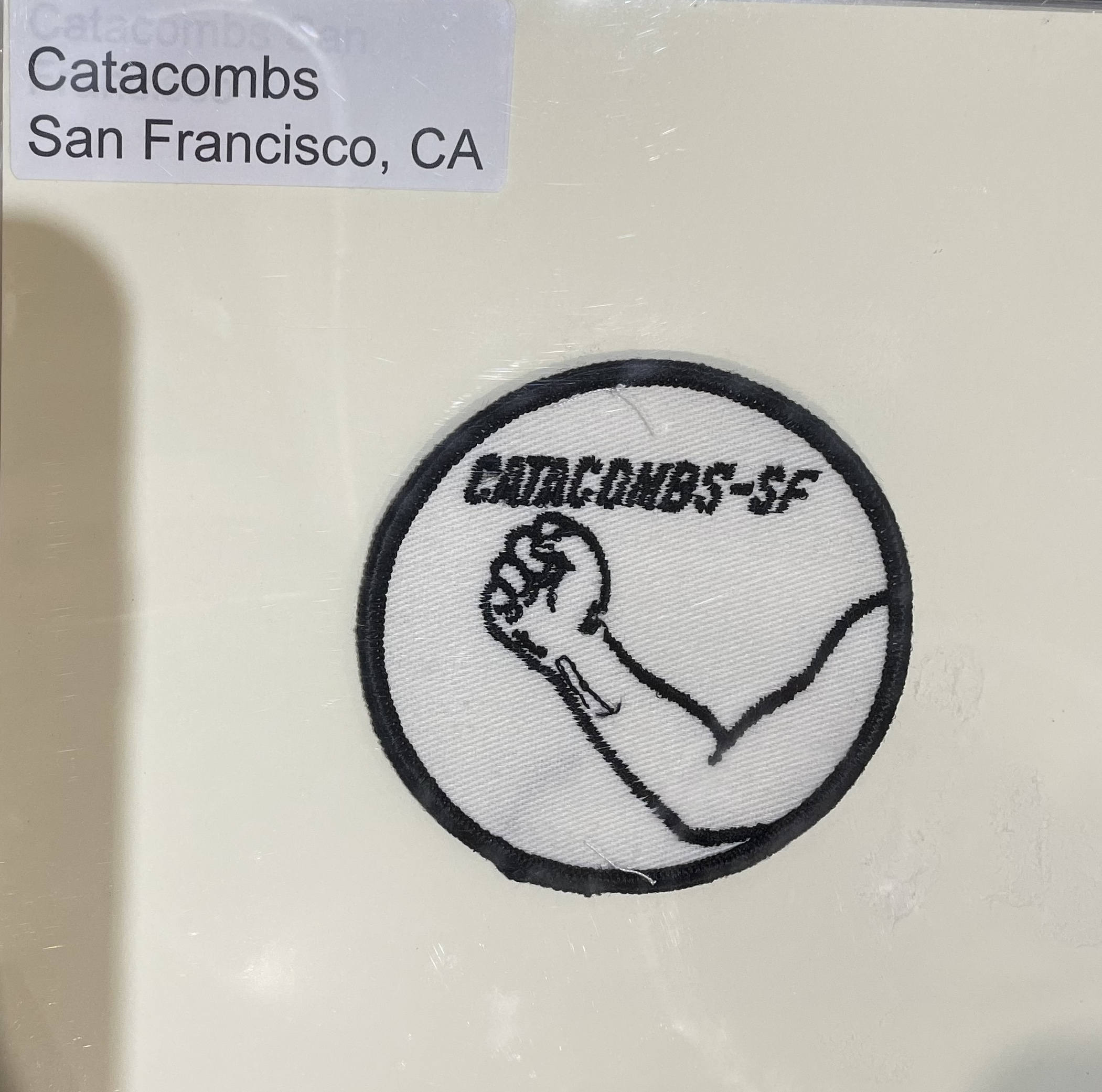
A patch for the Catacombs, a gay and lesbian fisting club

By 1980, associations had formed in major cities around the world for fisters to meet, play, and socialize with like-minded men, including "Fist Fuckers of America" (FFA), "Total Ass Involvement League" (TAIL), and "Mid America Fists In Action" (MAFIA). Founded in the late 1960s, FFA established chapters in Los Angeles, San Francisco, New York City, Philadelphia, Miami, and Washington, D.C. FFA registered as a non-profit under the pseudonym "Fall Festival Association." TAIL was founded in the early 1970s and included members in the United States, Canada, United Kingdom, and Australia. MAFIA was founded in Chicago in 1978 and remains active as of 2025.

Fisting parties became a major social activity for "dedicated handballers," some of whom attended as many as three each month. Parties tended to be held at gay bathhouses with carefully controlled guest lists ranging from eight to eighty people. In 1975, approximately 300 men gathered for a two-day fisting convention and contest organized by FFA in Ossining, New York. In addition to arranging sex parties, associations organized social events including dinners, games, cook-outs and bar meet-ups.

Crisco was commonly used as a fisting lubricant since it was inexpensive and widely available, as depicted in pornographic films such as Erotic Hands (1974). As a result, Crisco became a euphemism for fisting in gay slang.

The onset of the AIDS epidemic in the 1980s claimed the lives of countless fisters, many of whom were particularly vulnerable due to the common pairing of fisting with unprotected anal sex and drugs. In response to the AIDS crisis, safe sex advocates launched public health campaigns to promote the use of gloves. Meanwhile, cities such as San Francisco and New York forcibly closed gay establishments that—accurately or not—were believed to permit unsafe sex, including fisting. Consequently, many popular venues for fisting permanently closed. Although closures were supported by some members of the gay community, many regarded the closures as a coming at least in part from anti-gay attitudes and disapproval of homosexual activity in particular.

Fisting's visibility and popularity has grown in the twenty-first century, likely due in large part to the internet and greater HIV prevention and treatment options. Fisting pornography is now widely available online and fisters can easily meet via social media platforms, some of which are tailored for fisting (e.g. Recon). Gay bathhouses have made a comeback and some bathhouses and bars routinely host and advertise fisting parties.

== Techniques ==
Trust between partners is generally imperative to ensure physical and psychological safety and enjoyment. A common technique, particularly for beginners, is to extend four fingers straight with thumb tucked beneath. Some refer to this technique as the "silent duck". In more vigorous forms of fisting, often referred to as "punching" or "punch fisting", the hand is partly or fully clenched into a fist before, during, and/or after insertion.

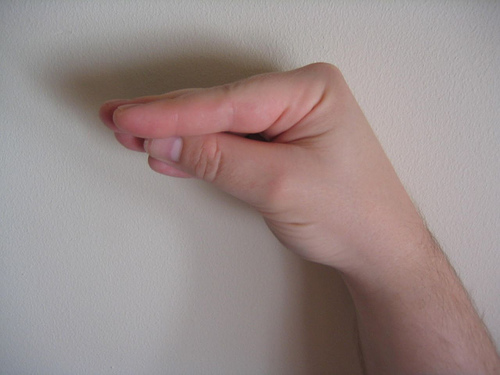
"Silent duck" hand position

Oftentimes, hands are inserted up to the wrist. Some experienced fisters enjoy deeper penetration, referred to as "depth play", in which hands may be inserted as far as (or past) the elbow. Taking two hands at once is referred to as "double fisting". In the case of double fisting, pleasure may be derived more from the stretching of the anus or vagina than from the in-and-out movement of hands.

Lubricants designed specifically for fisting or with fisting as an intended use are widely available in some countries. Fisters commonly use sex toys to loosen the anus or vagina before or during a fisting session.

Douching is common before anal fisting both for aesthetic purposes and to reduce risk of fecal contamination.

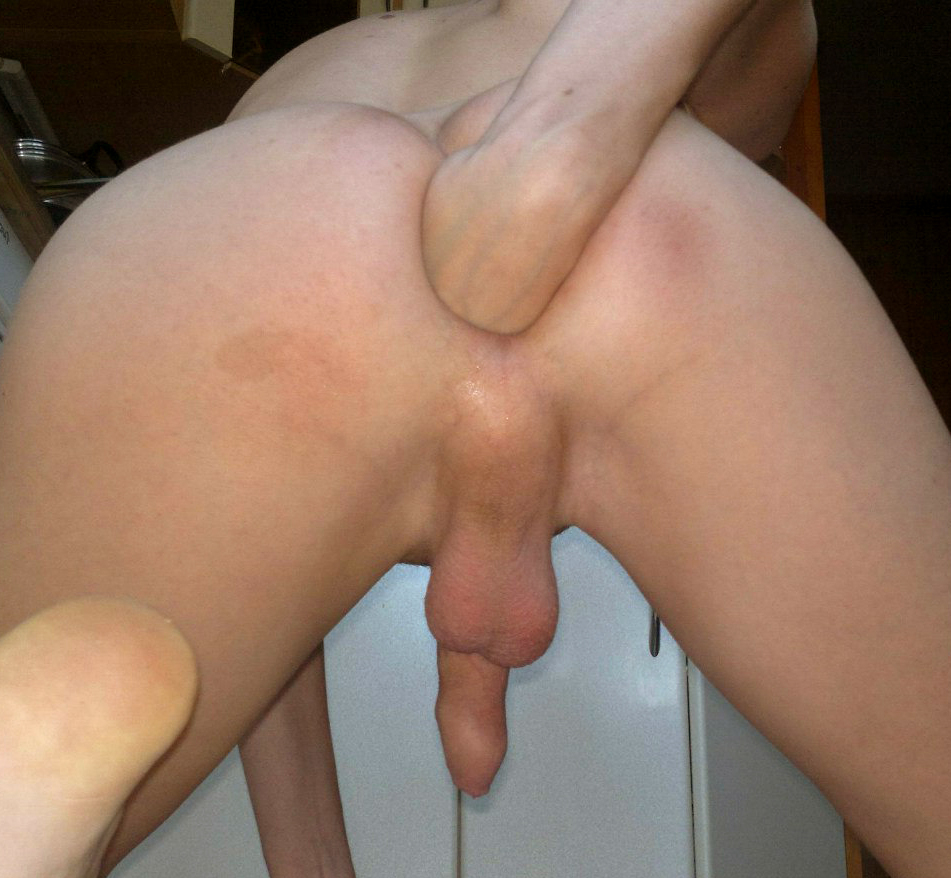
Anal self-fisting

== Terminology ==
According to The Routledge Dictionary of Modern American Slang and Unconventional English, "fisting" and "fist fuck" entered the American slang lexicon no later than 1969. Common fisting-related terms include:

- Fist; fist fuck (verb): "the practice of inserting the hand (and part of the arm) into a partner's anus (or vagina) for the sexual pleasure of all involved," commonly abbreviated as "FF" or "FFun."
- Handball: synonym for fisting^{A}
- Fister; fist-fucker: a practitioner of fisting; or, depending on context, a penetrative partner ("top") in a fisting session involving two or more people.
- Fistee: a receptive partner ("bottom") in a session involving two or more people.
- Punch; punch fist (verb): fisting in which the hand is partly or fully clenched into a fist before, during, and/or after insertion.
- Double; double fist (verb): fisting in which two hands are inserted simultaneously.
- Rosebud; prolapse: when rectal walls prolapse to such degree that they protrude out of the anus. Can be induced by fisting or other anal play (named due to resemblance to a rose).
- Bloom (verb): the act of inducing a rosebud or prolapse.

In medical contexts, fisting is sometimes referred to brachioproctic eroticism or brachioproctic/brachiovaginal insertion.

^A"Fisting" and "handballing" are often used interchangeably, but some consider the former term to be crude or violent and perceive the latter as more closely associated with "intimate love-making and spiritual communion".

== Risks ==
Safe enjoyment of fisting requires an understanding of potential risks and techniques for mitigating them. Fisting carries a risk of transmitting sexually transmitted infections. When practiced improperly, fisting can cause serious injuries, including perforation of the vagina, perineum, rectum, or colon, that in rare cases can result in death. Sexual activities that force air into the vagina can lead to a fatal air embolism, predominantly during pregnancy.

A 2021 study found that men who practiced anal fisting were more likely to experience fecal incontinence than men who engaged in other forms of anal sex, but more research is required to establish a causal link and determine whether this is temporary or long-term.

According to Barcelos, "clinical and forensic research has over-inflated the 'dangers' of fisting without an understanding of contexts in which fisting takes place", and that anal and vaginal fisting present "low to no risk" of sexually transmitted infections. Gloves, lubricant, and fingernail trimming can help reduce risk.

== In popular culture ==
References to fisting can be found in art, music, cinema and other forms of popular culture. Examples include:

=== Art ===
- The San Francisco South of Market Leather History Alley, opened in 2017, honors Steve McEachern (owner of the Catacombs, the most famous fisting club in the world) and Bert Herrman (a fisting community leader, author, and publisher), among other members of the leather community.
- Erotic photography by Robert Mapplethorpe, including "Double Fist Fuck" (1977), "Fist Fuck / Full Body" (1978), "Helmut Fist Fuck" (1978), and "Helmut and Brooks, N.Y.C." (1978).
- Erotica by Tom of Finland, Dom Orejudos, Bill Schmeling, Chuck Arnett, Gengoroh Tagame, John Klamik, and Drubskin
- Hanky Panky (2020), a painting by Kent Monkman

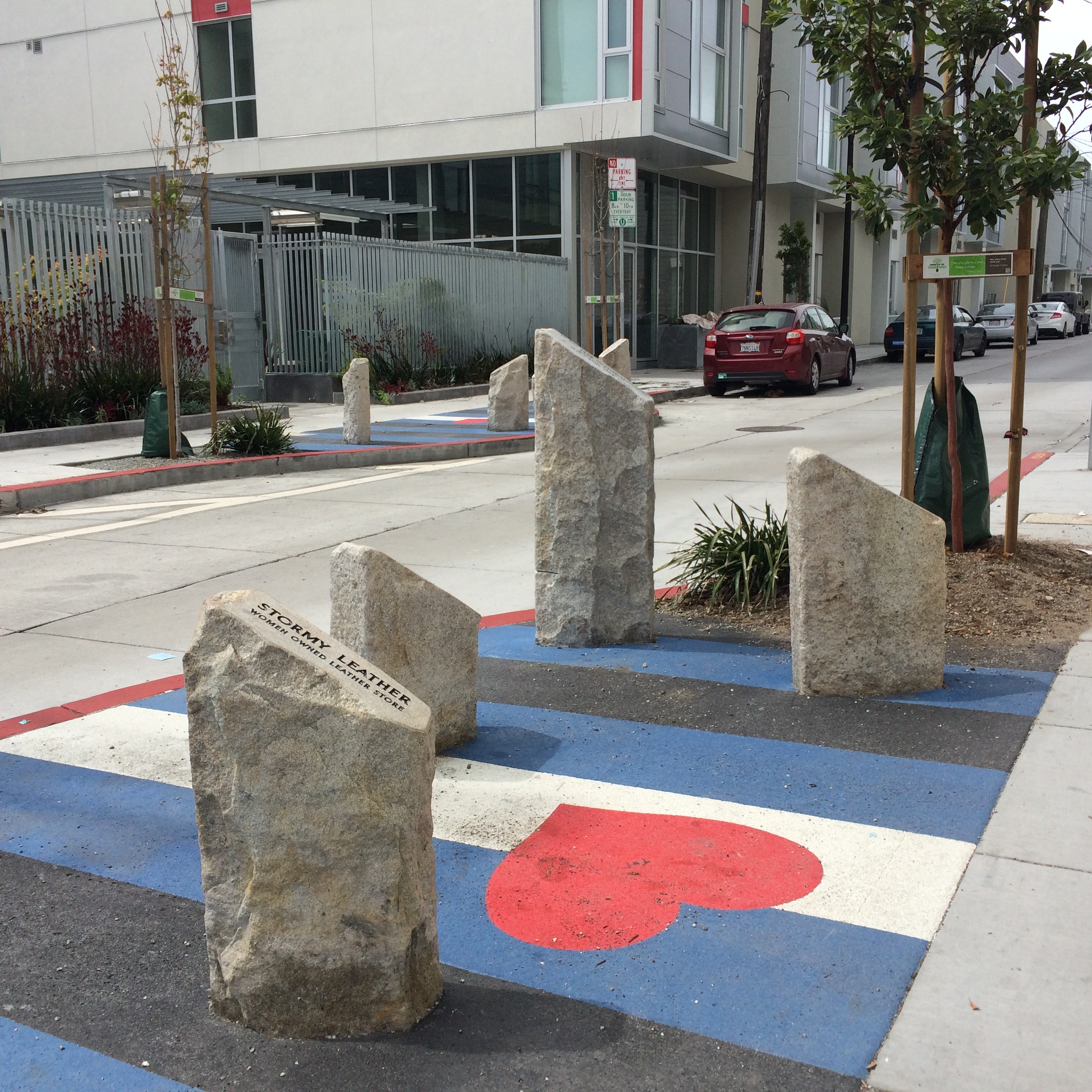
San Francisco South of Market Leather History Alley

==== Performance art ====
- In Solar Anus (1999), Ron Athey challenged the feminization and sexual roles associated with male penetration by both giving and receiving penetration through self-fisting.
- In Being Green (2009), Jess Dobkin was fisted while dressed as the hand puppet Kermit the Frog.
- In 2013, Detroit-based artist Jerry Vile placed a 4-ft. tall can of Crisco in front of the fist-shaped Monument to Joe Louis for "helping to ease the pain of Detroit's bankruptcy." Many interpreted the can as a reference to fisting, as it is a sex act in which Crisco is sometimes used as lubricant.

=== Music ===
- The album cover for Slide... Easy In by Rod McKuen (1977) depicts gay porn star Bruno's fist clenching "Disco" shortening. The inscription states "this was a project everyone had to get into; not just on the surface, but deeply—and together. If you don't feel "easy in" then perhaps your threshold of pain or pleasure needs looking into." (The European edition of the album featured a different cover because the original was considered "too outrageous.")
- "Krisco Kisses" (1984) by Frankie Goes to Hollywood
- "Stinkfist" (1996) by Tool in which fisting is used as a metaphor
- Music video for "House of Air" (2017) by Brendan Maclean

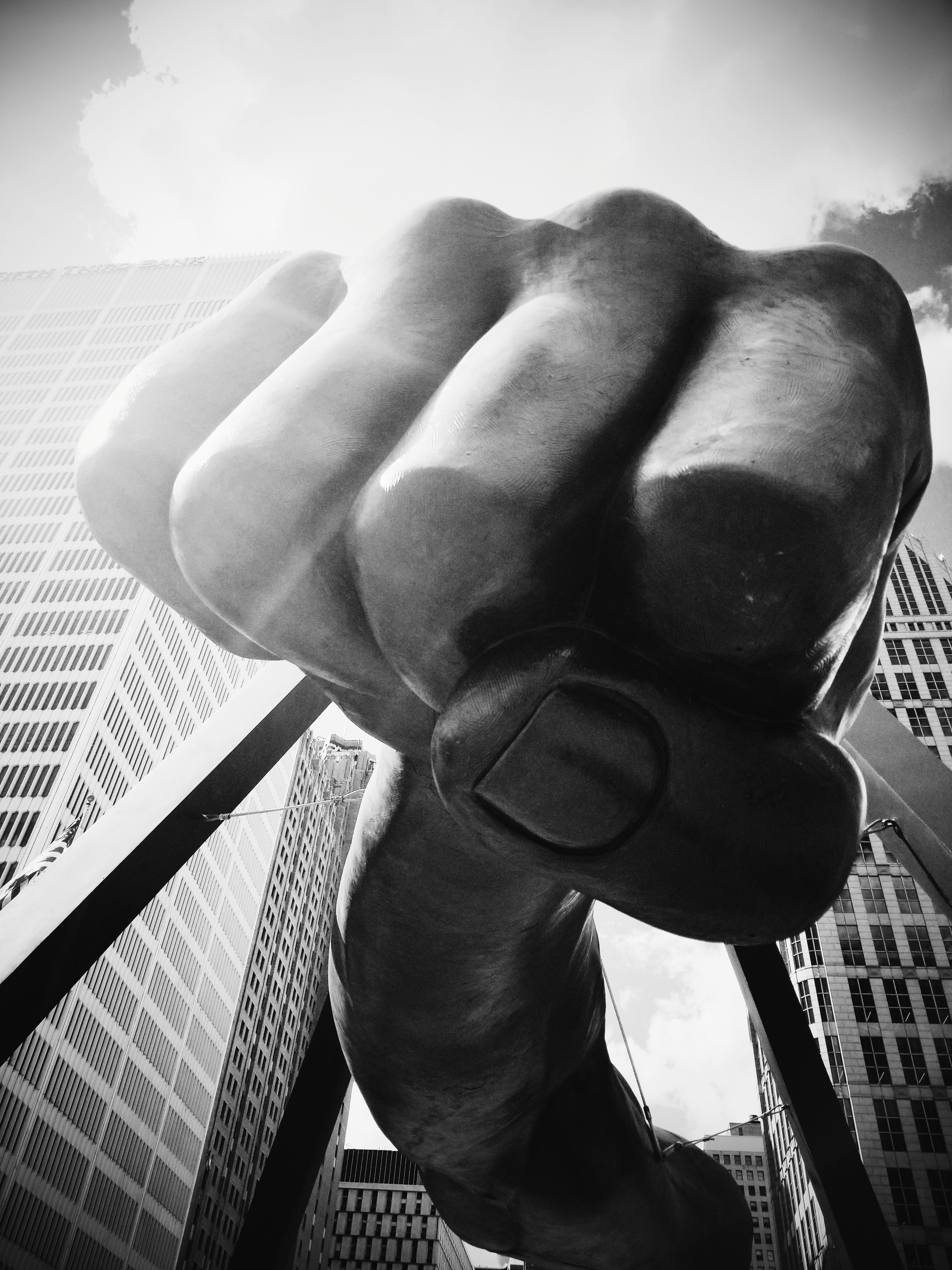
The Monument to Joe Louis, which made headlines in 2013 for what was widely considered a fisting reference

=== Film ===
- Caligula (1979)
- Cruising (1980)
- South Park: Bigger, Longer & Uncut (1999)
- Fifty Shades of Grey (2015)

==== Pornographic films ====
- L.A. Plays Itself (1972)
- Drive (1974)
- Candy Strippers (1978) (Two fisting scenes are edited from some versions of the film. According to reviewers, the scenes are edited from the main movie in the DVD release, but are included as hidden features to be found separately.)
- The Other Side of Aspen (1978) (Fisting was cut from the film's original 1978 release, but was included in its 2002 re-release.)
- Erotic Hands (1980)
- Tampa Tushy Fest, Part 1 (1999)

=== Television ===
- In 1993, Julian Clary joked "I've just been fisting Norman Lamont 'round the corner" during a live broadcast of the British Comedy Awards viewed by 13 million people.
- In South Park season 5 episode 14 ("Butters' Very Own Episode", December 2001), Butters's father watches the film "Fisting Firemen 9" at a gay adult theater.
- Judges and contestants on RuPaul's Drag Race and its spin-offs are known to sometimes make fisting-related jokes.

=== Literature ===
- All trilogy (1969–1971) by Dirk Vanden
- The Fist Fucker's Manual (circa 1970) by Art Hamilton
- Faggots (1978) by Larry Kramer
- Maitreya (1978) by Severo Sarduy
- The Divine Androgyne According To Purusha (1981) by Purusha Larkin
- The Intelligent Man's Guide to Handball (The Sexual Sport) (1983) by R.A. Fournier
- Trust: The Handbook: A Guide to the Sensual and Spiritual Art of Handballing (1991) by Bert Herrman
- A Hand in the Bush: The Fine Art of Vaginal Fisting (1997) by Deborah Addington

=== Clubs ===
- Crisco Disco, discotheque in New York City (1970s-1980s)
- Catacombs, sex club in San Francisco that was the most famous fisting club in the world (opened originally from 1975 to 1981, reopened at another location from 1982 to 1984)
- Mineshaft, bar and sex club in New York City (1976–1985)
- Crisco Club, gay bar and sex club in Florence, Italy (est. 1981)
- Handball Express
- La Fistinière, fisting guesthouse and sex club in Assigny, France (2007–2018)
- Le One Way, gay bar and sex club in Paris, France
- Red Hanky Express

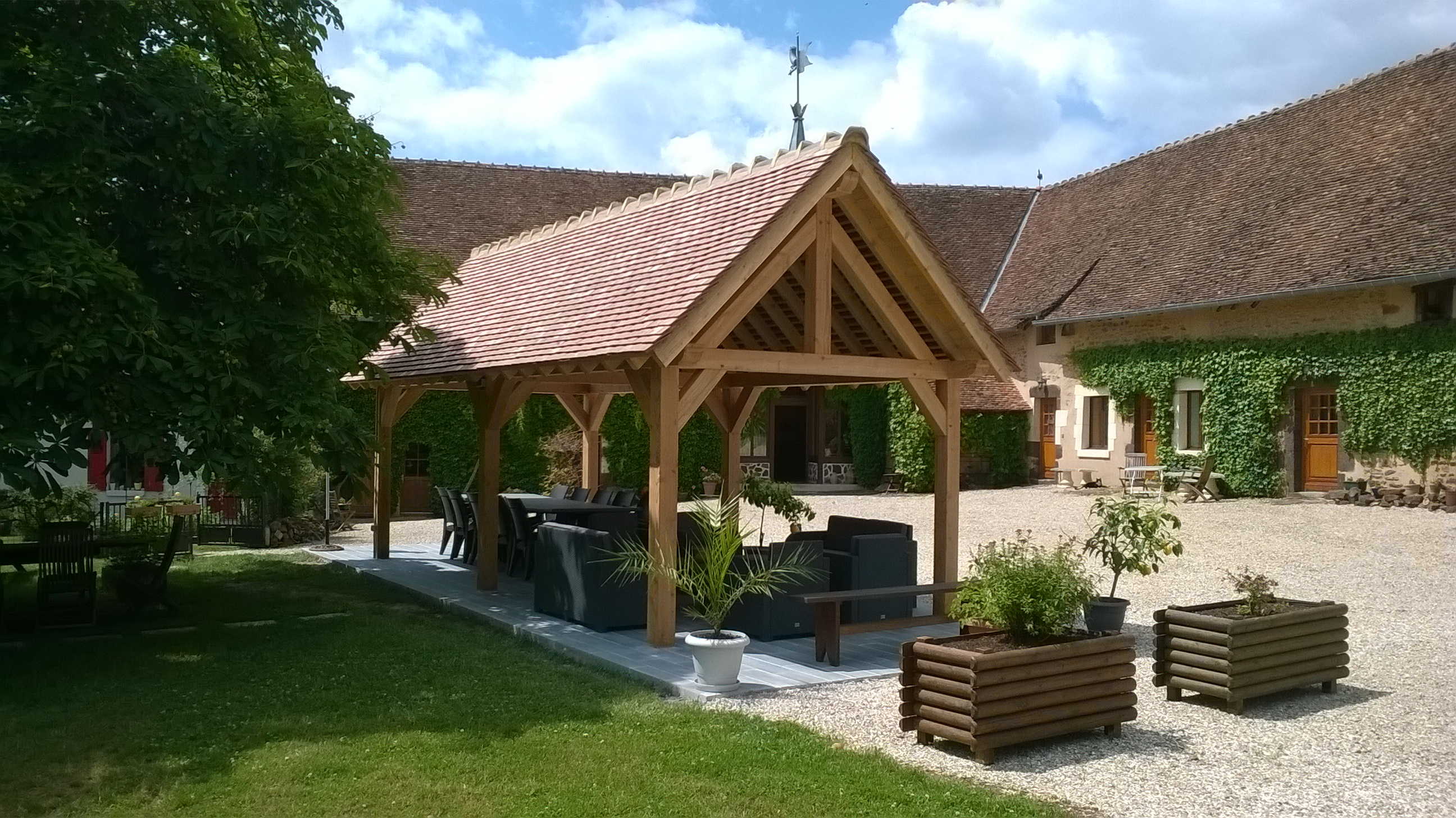
La Fistinière, a fisting club in France

=== International Fisting Day ===
In 2011, adult performers Jiz Lee and Courtney Trouble designated October 21 as "International Fisting Day" to promote visibility and to protest pornography companies' refusal to distribute films depicting fisting. In 2025, Fist Club Europe e.V. designated May 5 as a second date of observance for the holiday, with a focus "on the lived practices of the global gay community." As the fifth day of the fifth month, May 5 (5/5) symbolizes the five fingers of each hand.

=== Other ===
- In the handkerchief code, the color red signifies interest in fisting.
- In 1980, Drummer reported plans for an annual "Mr. Fist Contest" organized by the Rodeo Riders, a Chicago-based leather club.

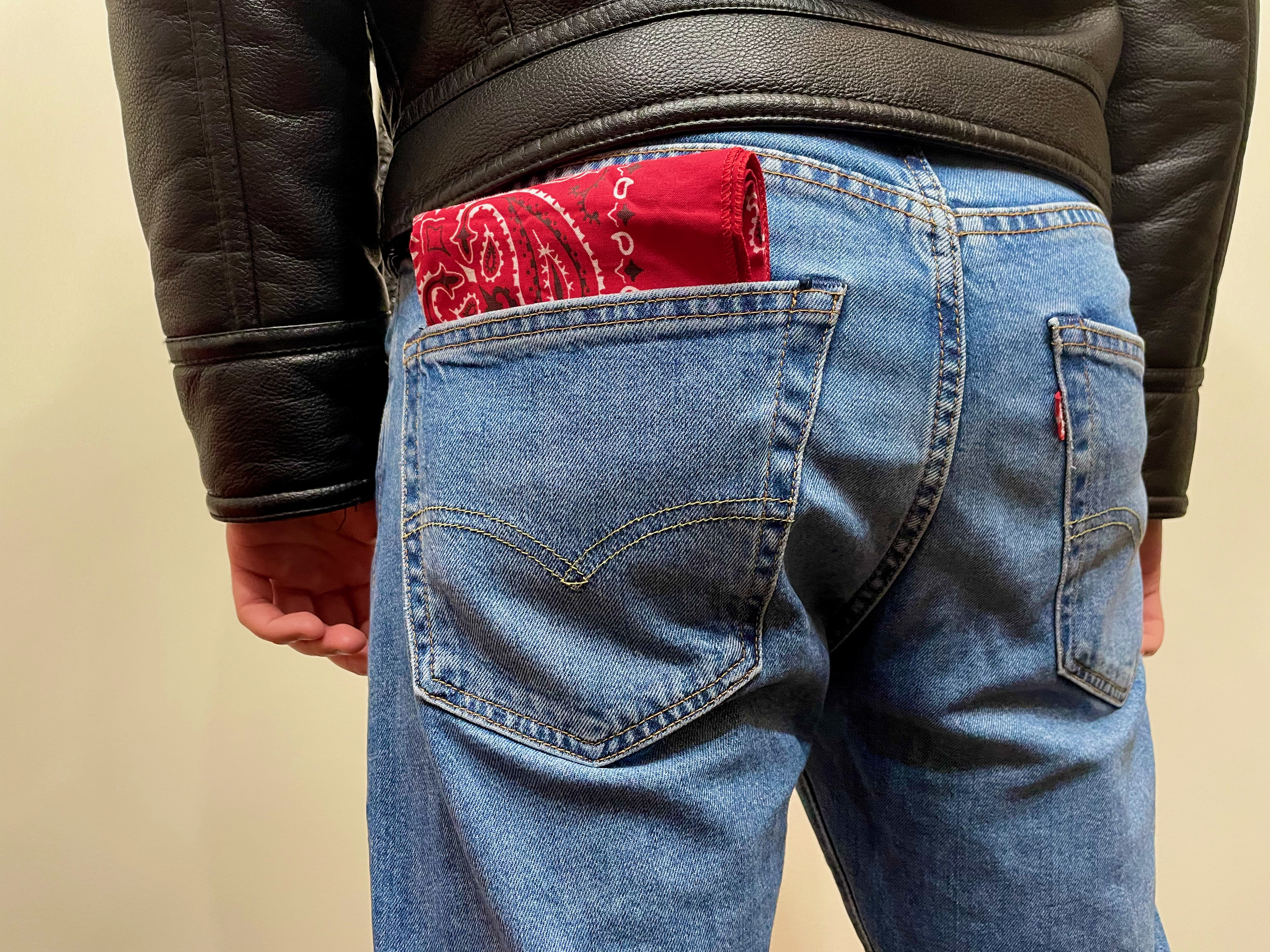
In the handkerchief code, the color red signifies interest in fisting.

== Legal status ==
In some nations, fisting—particularly anal fisting—has historically been censored and criminalized due to its association with gay sex and characterization by critics as an obscene and deviant act.

=== United Kingdom ===
In the United Kingdom, performing fisting and fisting pornography are both legal. However, until 2019, the Crown Prosecution Service (CPS) considered publication of fisting material to be grounds for prosecution under the Obscene Publications Act 1959 and Section 63 of the Criminal Justice and Immigration Act 2008, the latter of which prohibits so-called "extreme pornography." In 1998, the University of Central England was involved in a controversy when a library book by Robert Mapplethorpe was confiscated from a student by the police, who informed the university that two photographs in the book (including one involving fisting) would have to be removed. If the university agreed to the removal (which it did not) the book would be returned. The two photographs, which were deemed possibly prosecutable as obscenity, included "Helmut and Brooks, NYC, 1978", which shows anal fisting. However, after a delay of about six months, the affair came to an end when Peter Knight, the Vice-Chancellor of the university, was informed that no legal action would be taken. The book was returned to the university library without removal of the photos. In R v Peacock (2012), the jury found Michael Peacock not guilty of breaching the Obscene Publications Act for selling DVDs containing anal fisting. That same year, a jury took less than 90 minutes to acquit Simon Walsh for possession of images of anal fisting that the Crown Prosecution Service (CPS) alleged constituted illegal, extreme pornography. In 2019, the CPS declared it would no longer prosecute pornography produced by consenting adults engaging in legal acts, including fisting.

=== United States ===
Fisting was historically subject to censorship in the United States. For example, in the 1970s, the Los Angeles Police Department forced director Wakefield Poole to remove depictions of fisting from his films as a precondition for airing them in the city. More recently, during 2001–02, Seymore Butts (also called Adam Glasser) was the focus of an obscenity-based court case, People of the State of California v. Adam Glasser, et al., over the depiction of vaginal fisting in his 1999 video Tampa Tushy Fest 1. Glasser pleaded not guilty to violating California Penal Code Sections 311.2(a), "production, distribution or exhibition of obscene matter"; and 311.5, "advertising or promoting matter represented to be obscene", better known as "pandering obscenity". Then before trial, he reached a plea agreement in which his company pleaded "no contest" to "creating a public nuisance", and paid a $1,000 fine, in exchange for all other obscenity charges being dropped against the defendants.

Fisting was included on the Cambria List, meant to be a list of sex acts that carry risk of prosecution under U.S. obscenity law, created by Paul Cambria in 2001 to help producers avoid obscenity lawsuits. However, as of 2019, the Cambria List is generally regarded as obsolete within the American pornography industry.

== See also ==
- Anal sex
- Sex toy
- Sexual intercourse
- Sexual fetishism
- Sexual penetration
