= Steven Toushin =

American pornographer, author, and businessman

- Occupations: businessman, pornographer, author
- Website: www.bijouworld.com

Steven Toushin is an American producer and distributor of gay pornographic and BDSM films who has operated adult theaters and sex clubs since 1970. Toushin owned and managed the Bijou Theater in Chicago, the oldest gay adult theater and sex club in the United States. Toushin has produced multiple underground and classic pornographic films through his studio Bijou Video and published several books on the matter. He and his businesses have been the subject of twenty-one obscenity cases, including two federal trials, and he has suffered thirty-five personal arrests and over 200 busts to his businesses.

== Career ==
In 1970 Toushin and partners presented at the Aardvark the first hardcore pornography film to be released commercially in the U.S., Alex DeRenzy's "Pornography in Denmark." At that point the Aardvark became a porn theater. Later that year Toushin and his partners opened other theaters and sex clubs throughout Chicago, San Francisco, Indianapolis, East Chicago and Gary, Indiana, including the Festival Chicago, Festival Indianapolis, Termite, 3-Penny, Eden, Savages, and Bijou Theater.

To obtain a theater license, Toushin initially presented the Bijou as an art house and within two weeks it became a gay adult theater. Toushin began producing gay adult films around 1972, initially making short films in Chicago and feature films in California. His first federal obscenity trial occurred in 1973 for screening Ranch Slaves.

In 1978, he added booths to the Bijou and began selling gay porn videos through Bijou Video. Around 1981, he opened the second floor of the theater, as a sexual playground. The theater later expanded its adult-entertainment facilities, adding stripper services in the 1990s and an Erotic Cabaret in the 2000.

Although Toushin operated the Bijou Theatre and Bijou Video, which catered primarily to gay men, he is a straight man.

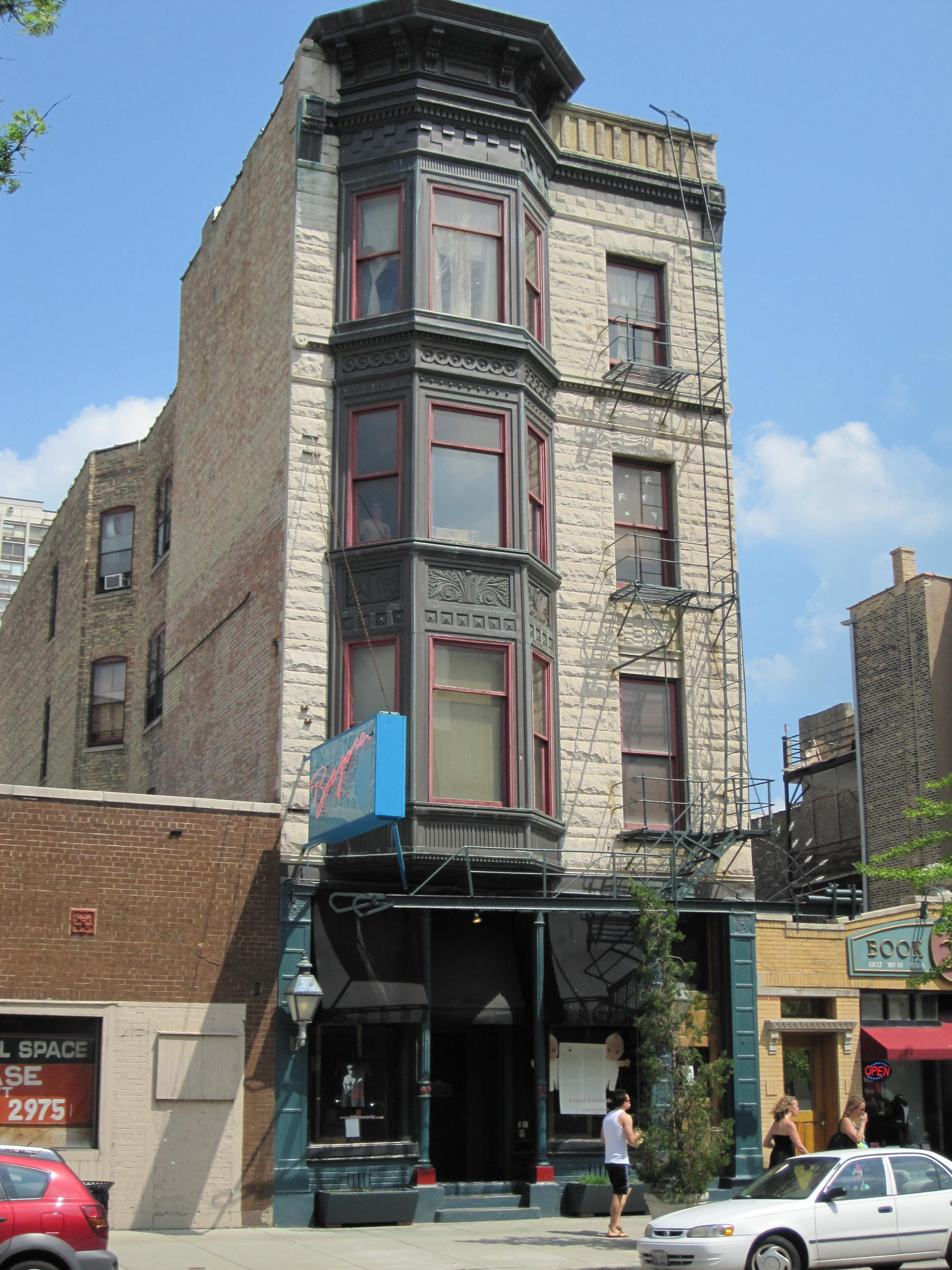
Bijou Theater (2011)

== 1989 federal obscenity trial ==
Toushin's second federal obscenity suit began in July 1988 when grand juries in Tennessee and Utah indicted him for the distribution of Erotic Hands, The Final Chapter of Mistress Ann, You Said a Mouthful, and Please Sir, films that depict extremely brutal and degrading S/M scenes. Nonetheless, Toushin argued that his BDSM films were not legally obscene. At the time of indictment, the U.S. government was conducting a third investigation in Nebraska and an indictment there followed. All three investigations were the product of a federal program named “Operation PostPorn” which comprised a nationwide federal investigation spanning 9 U.S. cities and led to the indictment of 20 people and 14 corporations including Toushin and his companies.

The U.S. government sought indictments for "obscenity by the standards of a local community" by ordering U.S. Postal Inspectors in Tennessee, Utah, and Nebraska to order catalogs and magazines from Toushin's businesses located in Chicago, IL. Tennessee District Judge John T. Nixon stated that “there is no established evidence that the films involved in this case have ever been sent to the jurisdiction by defendants except for those copies ordered by the Government". Toushin asked the Tennessee court to transfer his case to Northern Illinois but Judge Nixon refused, stating that the appropriate finder of fact is a jury selected from the community in which the offense took place and that such a transfer should only be granted when there is “intentional overreaching” by the government. Nixon found that “although the Government took measures inducing the defendants to mail allegedly obscene materials to Middle Tennessee, the defendants made a deliberate decision to conduct business here [by mailing the materials]". (see Miller test)

Judge Nixon had consistently demonstrated his displeasure with the U.S. Government for “attempt[ing] to fabricate venue".

== Private Life ==
Toushin was married twice. His first wife was Susan Toushin, whom he later divorced. By 2011, he was living with a female partner. He had two children, a son and a daughter.

== Publications ==
- The Destruction of the Moral Fabric of America by Steven Toushin: Toushin recounts the story of his 1989 federal obscenity trial in Nashville, Tennessee. Interwoven into his discussion of modern obscenity law are his observations while in prison, his proposal for certifying "masters, mistresses, slaves, and pro-dommes", a chapter on Jeffrey Dahmer, who killed one of Toushin's employees, and Toushin's theory on BDSM and the sexual future.
- The Puppy Papers by Steven Toushin and Puppy Sharon: The Puppy Papers is based on the true story of a women's search for her "master" in BDSM.
- Puppy Tales by Steven Toushin and Puppy Sharon is the continuation of Steven Toushin and Puppy Sharon's BDSM relationship.
- The Cock Coloring Book by Steven Toushin.

== Awards ==
- 2009: Inducted into Founders Branch of the Adult Video News Hall of Fame at the AVN Award Show in Las Vegas, Nev.
- 2007: Lifetime Achievement Award at the GayVN Award Show in San Francisco, CA.
