= La Fistinière =

Guesthouse and sex club for gay men into fisting

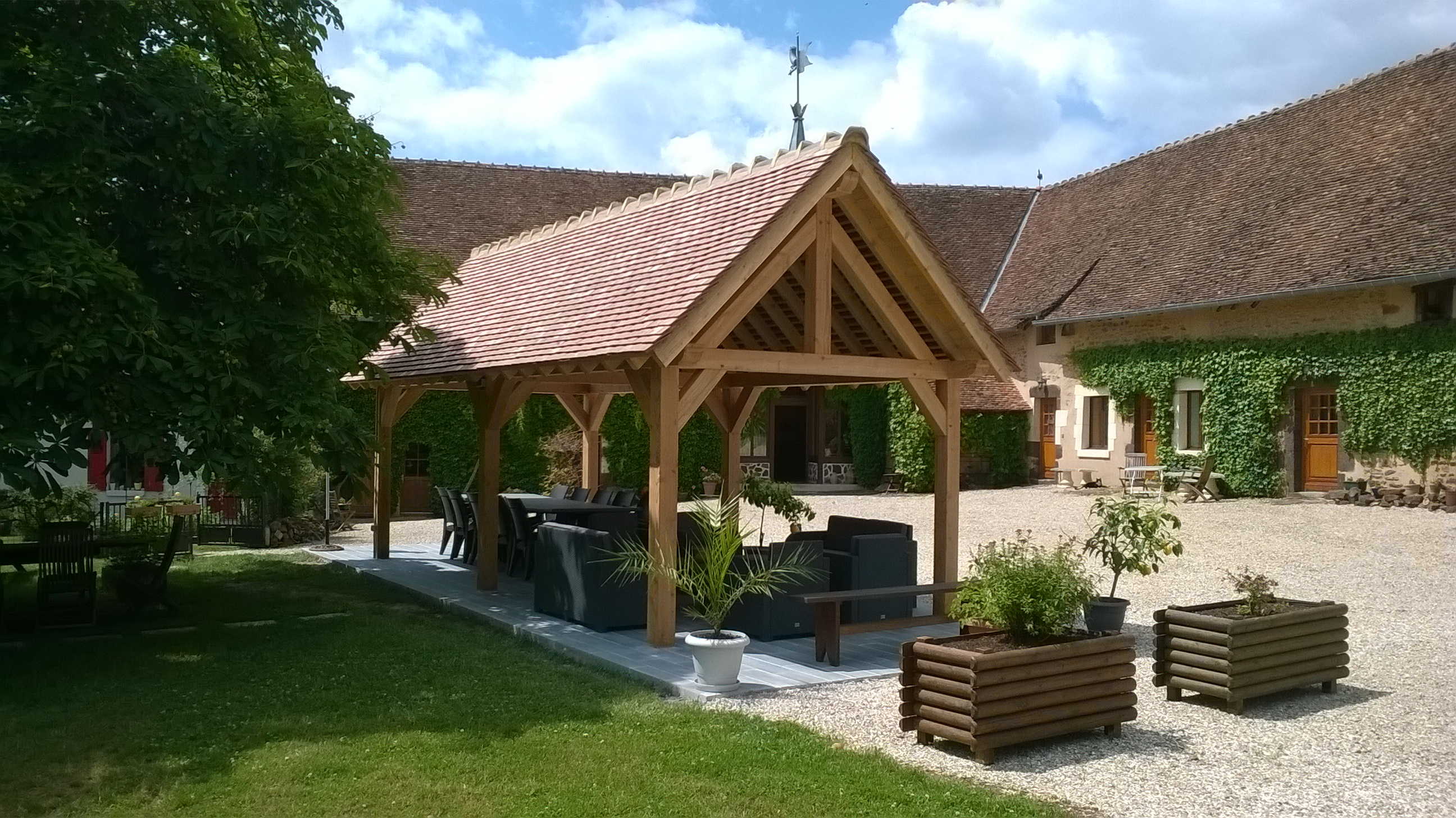
- Interactive map of the La Fistinière area

General information
- Type: Guesthouse, sex club
- Location: 2 Les Amelots 18260 Assigny, France
- Opened: 2007
- Closed: 2018
- Owner: François Mallet; Juan Carlos Garcia Berrio

Design and construction
- Known for: Fisting

Website
- www.lafistiniere.com

La Fistinière was a guesthouse and sex club for gay men "completely dedicated to the practice of Fist-Fucking and hard sexuality," located in Assigny, Cher, France. It was owned and operated by husbands François Mallet and Juan Carlos Garcia Berrio. La Fistinière operated from 2007 through 2018, during which time it attracted guests from all over the world.

== History ==
Husbands François Mallet and Juan Carlos Garcia Berrio were avid fisters (they once owned a cat named Fistouille, which roughly translates to “my beloved fist fuck”). In 2005, they acquired a 17th century farm in Assigny, a small town about 100 miles south of Paris. After renovations, they reopened the property in 2007 as a guesthouse exclusively for men who enjoy fisting. In a 2011 interview with Vice magazine, Berrio explained, "we enjoyed throwing orgies at home and wanted to create a place dedicated to fist fucking, where everyone would feel at home."

La Fistinière's website advertised the property as "a house for 'the big fisting family'" and included the following description:

"La Fistinière [is] a special and magic place... A place where everything was thought out for your comfort, your pleasure and your sexual fantasies... A place by a staff [sic] who wants to share his passion for Fist-Fucking!"

The guesthouse had five bedrooms accommodating up to 15 guests and offered breakfast, lunch, and dinner. Amenities included a swimming pool, a private park, and a play room known as the Fistine Chapel. Mallet and Berrio handled all day-to-day operations except cooking, which was performed by Mallet's sister.

Other programming and services included special theme nights and shuttle service to and from Cosne-sur-Loire station. Guests could purchase an all-inclusive weekend package that included lodging, dinner, Saturday night party, Sunday brunch, and free access to all facilities; special package rates were available for groups and longer visits.

La Fistinière held frequent events and holiday parties and occasionally hosted well-known artists. For example, singer Giedrė Barauskaitė performed at La Fistinière on May 6, 2017 to celebrate its tenth anniversary, and punk group Opium Du Peuple filmed a music video there in 2013.

According to its website, the guesthouse was visited by guests from 44 countries from five of the seven continents.

La Fistinière closed on December 31, 2018 after twelve years in operation, following a decision by Mallet and Berrio to put the property up for sale.

== Amenities ==
=== Fistine Chapel ===
The Fistine Chapel was the name of La Fistinière's 100 sq m play room. It was filled with sex furniture and all manner of sex toys and supplies for fisting and BDSM, including slings, benches, and a Saint Andrew's Cross. The sex toy collection included repurposed items from everyday life, such as baseball bats, golf clubs, and bowling pins (to use as dildos) and a veterinary speculum designed for cows and mares (for anal dilation).

Like its namesake, the Sistine Chapel in Vatican City, the Fistine Chapel featured a cathedral ceiling covered in frescoes, albeit much smaller and more erotic in nature. French artist Victor le Graphfist (b. 1967) created the frescoes, which depict a series of fisting orgies, including acts of double fisting and prolapse play. Mallet and Berrio referred to Graphfist as "our Michelangelo."

The Fistine Chapel also included a bar (open during "playtime hours") that sold wine, beer, mineral water, soda, juices, and candy. Hard liquor was not for sale as it was not permitted under the terms of La Fistinière's liquor license.

=== Outdoor Areas ===
La Fistinière featured an outdoor swimming pool, sundeck, outdoor terrace, and le parc d'attrap'fion ("the asshole catcher's park"). Outdoor areas were all clothing-optional and public sex was permitted as long as it was not visible or audible off the property; a note on the website encouraged guests to "ask about the fisting tree!"

=== Rooms ===
La Fistinière featured five non-smoking bedrooms, each with an ensuite bathroom:

1. The Attic: one double bed, upstairs, "perfect for lovers and those in need [of] extra privacy"
2. The Cowshed: three single beds, the "largest and most comfortable room in the house"
3. The Sheepfold: one queen bed, a "pastoral" room with original wall-mounted hay rack
4. The Pigstay: four single beds and one double bed, in the original pig sty, "for nasty pigs everywhere"
5. The Stable: three single beds, "fully wheelchair friendly"

A barn on the property was converted into a multi-level common area for guests, including the main dining room, boudoir, and a living room.

== Rules ==
La Fistinière required all guests to be consenting adults and to abide by the following rules:

1. "You can have sex in the areas created for that purpose ("Don't bring the guy picked up at the pool to fist him on the kitchen table!")"
2. The essence of hard sex is mutual trust. Therefore, for everyone's peace of mind, please respect your partner and his practices.
3. For safety reasons and hygiene, the use of Crisco, J-Lube and other lubricants is not allowed in the bedrooms or in or near the swimming pool.
4. "Thanks for not running around naked outside the property, not fucking where you could exposed to potential passers-by, and not "howling to the moon" during your outdoors play. Sound carries far in the countryside!"

== Philosophy ==
Mallet and Berrio regarded fisting as "magic" and "almost religious," not merely a sexual act. Berrio described fisting as "the act of opening another’s perception in a spiritual way" allowing a fister to touch, smell, taste, see, and feel the "unique, magnificent, and divine world of the inside of his partner." They considered the anus to be a "sacred ring."

Each year, Mallet and Berrio awarded the honorary title of La Truieasse ("the pig ass") to a guest who embodied their fisting philosophy and "the mind of La Fistinière." La Truieasse was defined as someone "who knows how to take and give pleasure, in conviviality, sharing, reciprocity, good mood and comradeship."

Mallet and Berrio chose archangel Uriel to be La Fistinière's patron saint. On their website, they described Uriel as one who "helps [us] to understand our inner nature" and "to evolve in all spiritual and material areas."

== See also ==
- La Fistinière - sous ma bonne étoile (2015), book by François Mallet
- Le cœur au Centre (2021), documentary short about La Fistinière produced by France 3 Centre-Val de Loire (translated captioning available)
- Photo gallery of Fistine Chapel art by Victor le Graphfist (pornographic content)
- "Fais Moi Mal Johnny," music video by Opium Du Peuple filmed at La Fistinière
