= A Very Natural Thing =

- Theatrical release poster
- Directed by: Christopher Larkin
- Written by: Joseph Coencas; Christopher Larkin
- Produced by: Christopher Larkin
- Starring: Robert Joel; Curt Gareth; Bo White; Anthony McKay; Marilyn Meyers
- Cinematography: C.H. Douglass
- Edited by: Terry Manning
- Music by: Gordon Gottlieb; Bert Lucarelli; Samuel Barber
- Distributed by: New Line Cinema
- Release date: 1974
- Running time: 80 min.
- Country: United States
- Language: English

A Very Natural Thing is a 1974 American film directed by Christopher Larkin and starring Robert Joel, Curt Gareth, Bo White, Anthony McKay, and Marilyn Meyers. The plot concerns a gay man named David who leaves a monastery to become a public school teacher by day, while looking for true love in a gay bar by night.

One of the first films about gay relationships intended for mainstream, commercial distribution, its original title was For as Long as Possible. It was released to mediocre reviews in 1973 and given an R rating by the Motion Picture Association of America.

== Plot ==
The film begins as a mini-documentary of New York City's 1973 Gay Pride parade and rally, with a lesbian unabashedly declaring, "being gay is a very natural thing". The action cuts to the protagonist, David (Robert Joel), going through the ritual of being released from his vocation as a monk in a monastery. He is then seen as a public school teacher of English Literature in the New York City area, who spends his time off driving into the city to be with his "oldest friend from Schenectady", Alan (Jay Pierce) at a gay bar. One night at the bar, David is singled out to dance by Mark (Curt Gareth), who portrays a businessman. They end up spending the night together, which at first seems like a one-night stand until David says he wants to see Mark again, and Mark agrees. Not long after, the pair begin a monogamous relationship, and David moves in with Mark. However, when Mark wants to have sex with other men, the relationship starts to deteriorate. He rejects the idea of modeling a gay relationship on heterosexual marriage, and is irritated that David wants to "keep pushing this romantic thing". Mark would rather have an understanding that either of them can have sex with men when they feel like it, but this ends up alienating them from each other. Mark refuses to say, "I love you" until David playfully wrestles with him and tells him, "Say it...again...once more for good measure". After a year, David realizes that the two of them are just marking time. The two travel to Fire Island for a weekend in an attempt to spice up their relationship, and although David tries to please Mark by entering an orgy, he cannot proceed with it. After a fight, David temporarily moves in with his friend Alan, who gives David an objective perspective on what happened. In a later encounter with Mark at Coney Island, David finally realizes that there cannot be a reconciliation, as Mark is more interested in sex than a romantic relationship.

After a season of loneliness, David meets a divorced photographer named Jason (Bo White) at the 1973 Gay Pride rally which began the film. David and Jason go to Jason's apartment and converse. In Jason, a divorced dad, we meet another member of the gay community, one who was living a heterosexual life prior to coming out. He still socializes with his ex-wife, who goes with him on photo shoots. On a parental visit with their toddler son (P.J.), Jason tells his ex-wife that he is now seeing someone with whom he would be spending the upcoming Labor Day holiday. It appears that in Jason, David has found someone willing to pursue a romantic, committed relationship with him. Jason takes pictures of David while telling him phrases to say other than "cheese", and the film ends by showing the two men together splashing naked and surfing in Cape Cod.

== Cast ==
- Robert Joel as David
- Curt Gareth as Mark
- Bo White as Jason
- Anthony McKay as Gary, David's roommate
- Marilyn Meyers as Valerie, Gary's fiancée
- Jay Pierce as Alan, David's friend
- Barnaby Rudge as Langley
- A. Bailey Chapin as the minister
- Scott Eisman as a student
- Michael Kell as father of boating family
- Sheila Rock as mother of boating family
- Linda Weitz as Linda, their daughter
- Robert Grillo as Edgar, David's friend
- Kurt Brandt as Edgar's lover Charles
- George Diaz as Miguel, one of Alan's lovers
- Deborah Trowbridge as Jason's ex-wife
- Jesse Trowbridge as P.J., Jason's son
- Vito Russo

== Critical reaction ==
A Very Natural Thing was seen as the gay response to Love Story (1970), the film famous for the phrase, "Love means never having to say you're sorry". Similarly, Mark tells David, "Love means never having to say you're in love", and a montage of the two men rolling down a leaf-covered hill, quietly lying together at home, and being in love mimics a montage of the heterosexual couple in Love Story. Both films argued for an unconventional alternative to traditional marriage, despite a commitment. David tells Jason he is committed to him, but that this commitment is based on wanting to be together, not having to be together. The ending is very optimistic, which was out of the ordinary for gay relationship films until then. Earlier films were dominated by tales of gays and lesbians being outcasts of society, mentally disturbed or committing suicide; later films were sadly dominated by the emergence of AIDS. A Very Natural Thing thus represents a short period in time where gay liberation flourished, and filmmakers could explore relationships in much the same way that films with heterosexual characters did.

The film was one of the first mainstream films to show homosexuality as a valid and normal act of love, i.e. "a very natural thing", as it attempted to explore the options for gay couples in 1973, including footage of an actual Gay Pride celebration. Many heterosexual film critics felt that the film's depiction of love between two men as romantic made the film automatically "an argument rather than an entertainment" (The New York Post). The film showed a young gay couple going through most of the same rituals and facing many of the same challenges as a straight couple.

Some gay film critics thought that the film was not political enough: that the characters were too apolitical, too middle class and, by rejecting the philosophy of free love or sexual liberation, the film was rejecting what some gay activists felt was a necessary value of the new gay liberation movement.

Larkin responded to the criticism by stating, "I wanted to say that same-sex relationships are no more problematic but no easier than any other human relationships. They are in many ways the same and in several ways different from heterosexual relationships but in themselves are no less possible or worthwhile". Incidentally, Vito Russo, who wrote The Celluloid Closet appears in A Very Natural Thing.

The film was not financially successful, and the director, Christopher Larkin, moved to San Diego, California, where in 1981 he published the book The Divine Androgyne According To Purusha. Larkin committed suicide on June 21, 1988, after a two-year struggle with HIV/AIDS.

== See also ==
- List of American films of 1974
- List of American films of 1973
