= Pornographic cinema =

Pornographic cinema may refer to:

- Pornographic film
- Adult movie theater, referred to as a cinema in Commonwealth English
