= Bijou Theater (Chicago) =

Gay adult theater and sex club in Chicago

Coordinates: 41°54′26″N 87°38′04″W

Bijou Theater.
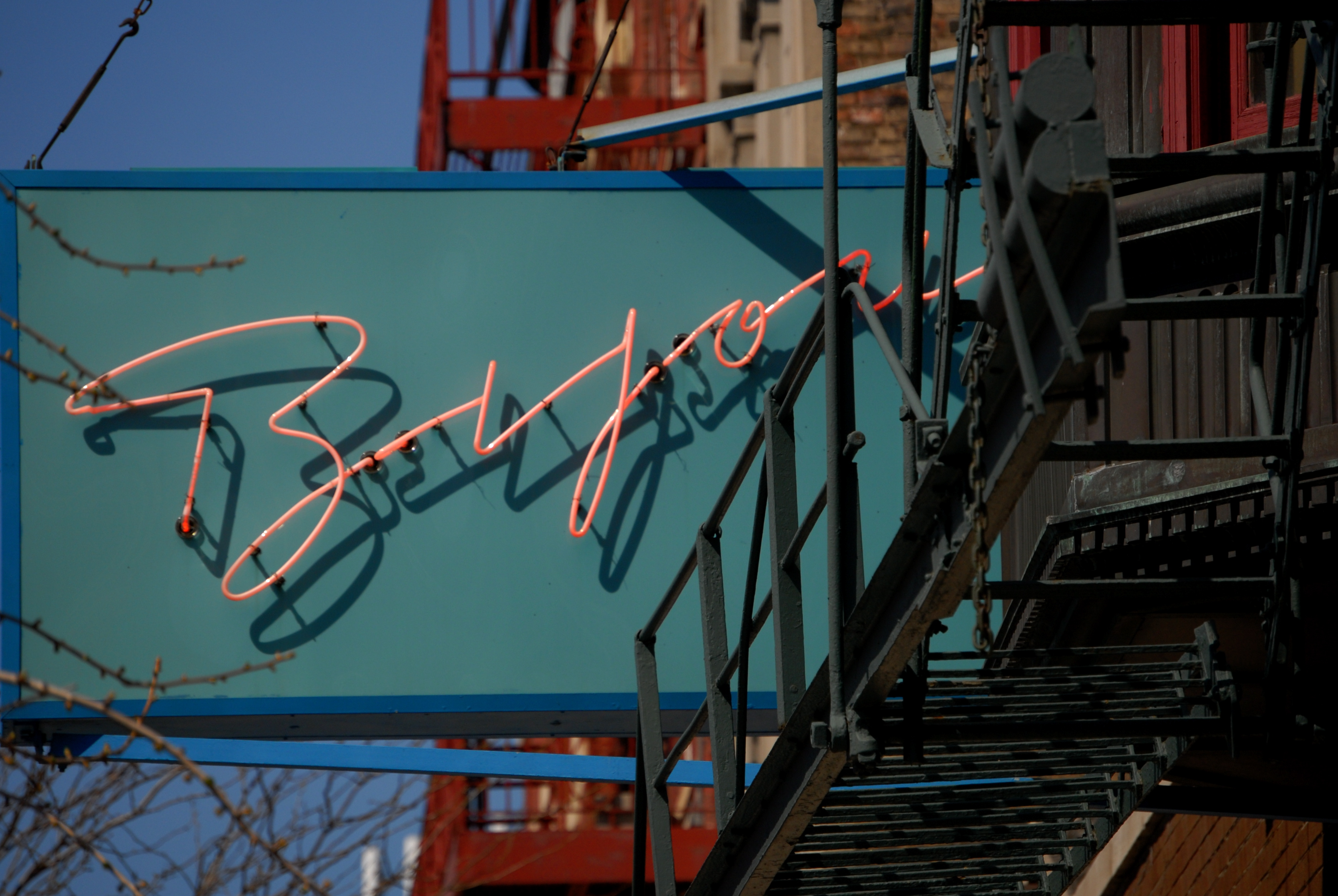
- Interactive map of the Bijou Theater. area

General information
- Type: Adult Theater, Sex Club
- Location: 1349 N Wells Street, Chicago, Illinois
- Opened: 1970
- Closed: 2015
- Owner: Steven Toushin

Website
- bijouworld.com/Theater.html

The Bijou Theater (also referred to as The Bijou) was an adult theater and sex club for gay men located at 1349 N Wells Street in Chicago's Old Town neighborhood. Opened in 1970 by Steven Toushin, the Bijou Theater was, at the time of its closure in 2015, the longest-running gay adult theater and sex club in the United States. The Bijou Theater featured the "Bijou Classics"—adult films produced by Bijou Video in the 1970s and 1980s—every Monday. The theater also hosted live shows featuring adult entertainers, a non-sexual cabaret show written and directed by drag entertainer Miss Tiger and special appearances by gay porn stars. The theater permanently closed on September 30, 2015.

== History ==
=== Theater ===
The Bijou Theater featured a 15-by-18-foot silver screen and seated 77 people in anchored, theater-style cushioned seating. The theater's lobby hosted a DVD counter to purchase gay adult films. A desk and computer were set up for patrons to peruse the Bijou's website listing over 14,000 titles. Titles found on the website were then available for purchase at the DVD counter.

=== Sex club ===
The Bijou Theater was known for its second-floor sex club. Travel magazines implored readers to explore the "gay man's fantasy playground" replete with glory holes, dark corners, and a BDSM dungeon with slings, crosses, and other fetish objects. Guests were invited to rent a locker to store their street clothes and change into their "play clothing". In warm weather, the club opened the Bijou Gardens, an outdoor playground. Prior to closure in 2015, the club operated 24/7.

=== Bijou Video ===
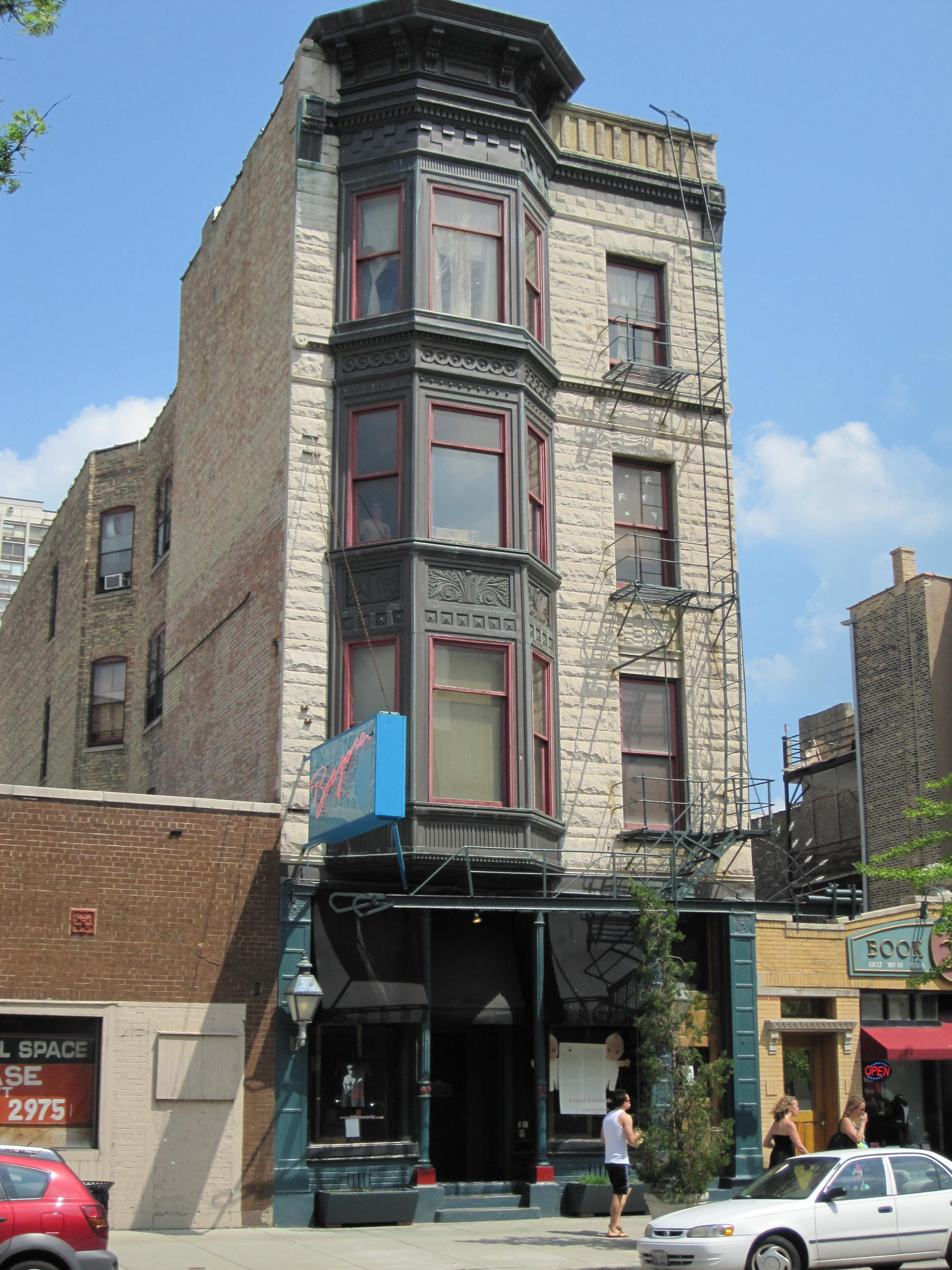
Bijou Theater (2011)

Toushin opened Bijou Video as a mail order pornographic film company in 1978. Bijou Video produced hundreds of gay pornographic films, many of which featured famous porn stars such as Al Parker (e.g. Turned On), Bruno (e.g. Pleasures in the Sun), and Richard Locke. Directors included Toby Ross, among others. Some of Bijou Video's films are notable for their BDSM and fetish content, such as fisting (e.g. Erotic Hands and Drive), food play (e.g. Food Sex), and bondage (e.g. Argos: The Sessions). Film production ended in the late 1990s. In 1999, Bijou Video began remastering and digitizing its film library of 16mm film, 1-inch masters, and 3/4 inch tapes.

=== Bijou Boys Erotic Cabaret ===
The Bijou Boys Erotic Cabaret featured solo performances by local and national male dancers. Performances featured full nudity and there were typically three to four dancers a show. Showtimes were select afternoons and nightly. The cabaret began to shift from typical go-go boy show to an avant-garde, high production value venue under the direction of Miss Tiger. Eventually, these more explicit shows were separated from a newly formed venue known as Miss Tiger's Cabaret.

=== Miss Tiger's Cabaret ===
Miss Tiger's Cabaret featured live singing, original music and original plays. The cabaret shows were written and directed by Miss Tiger and were the first of their kind to be performed at Bijou Theater. New shows were introduced about every eight weeks; with productions taking place Thursdays through Saturdays at 8:30 pm and 10:30 pm each night. This cabaret included both a male and female cast and featured very little nudity. Cast members included a few of the dancers from the erotic cabaret but were mostly singers and actors from Chicago's community theater scene. Original music was created by Chicago music producer DJ Christian, who often accompanied Miss Tiger in music bookings outside of the theater. Each production featured theatrical lighting, original costumes and set design. Many shows were photographed and reviewed by St. Sukie de la Croix of the Windy City Times. Miss Tiger later wrote an advice column for Nightspots, a weekly Chicago LGBTQIA entertainment magazine. Shows ran from 2000 through 2004.

== Ownership ==
The Bijou Theater was owned and operated by American pornographer Steven Toushin. Toushin was put in charge of the Bijou in 1970, with the venue eventually showing gay films exclusively in 1978. He has had several legal disputes with law enforcement over the years, including a conviction for tax evasion in the late 1980s and a number of obscenity indictments. In 1989, at the Adult Video Awards show in Las Vegas, Toushin received (while he was in prison) the Reuben Sturman Award "For Legal Battles on Behalf of the Adult Industry". In 2007, at the GayVN award show in San Francisco, Toushin was awarded a "Life Time Achievement Award" from the gay adult industry. In the June 2008 AVN (Adult Video News) magazine's 25th anniversary edition, Toushin was acknowledged as one of the 25 pioneers who developed the gay/bi adult film industry. Toushin was inducted into the Founders Branch of the Adult Video News Hall of Fame at the 2009 AVN Award Show in Las Vegas, Nevada. Other Founders include Phil Harvey and Larry Flynt.

== Controversy ==
Jeffrey Dahmer frequented the Bijou Theater, and Jeremiah Weinberger, who worked at the theater, was one of his murder victims; Dahmer met Weinberger at the nearby Carol's Speakeasy in July 1991 and killed him in Milwaukee. During the Dahmer trials, many gay establishments, such as bathhouses and gay clubs, were left vacant or less busy than usual due to the gruesome details of these murders and fears from the community of falling victim.

In January and February 1975, the theater showed the gay pornographic feature film Him by Ed D. Louie, which focused on a young man with a sexual fixation on Jesus Christ. As of 2025, no copy of the film has been found and it is classified as a lost film, with some sources suggesting that it was a hoax.

On September 21, 1976, co-owner Paul Gonsky was murdered in Old Town; the killing has been linked to Frank Schweihs, a Chicago Outfit enforcer associated with the area's pornography rackets, though he was never charged in connection with it.

== Involvement with queer politics ==
As with many other gay and lesbian theaters during the 1960s, the presence of these communities allowed others to express themselves freely and spread ideas of acceptance and identity in a safe place. Specifically, sex theaters, such as the Bijou, pushed boundaries between theater and pornography films, and it played a significant role in the development of the gay pornography industry, which became an important cultural and economic force for the LGBT community. It allowed the conversation to open up about sexual health and safety in LGBT spaces, exhibiting how pornography should not be strictly heteronormative.

Gay erotic theater thrived due to the confluence of gay activism and a push for visibility, the deteriorating obscenity laws that often targeted queer communities, demands of a gay consumer base, and a broad spirit of self expression. Before its opening in 1970, the Stonewall riots in 1969 created a political push for the visibility and acceptance of LGBT individuals.

The Bijou Theater also played a role in the development of HIV/AIDS activism in the 1980s and 1990s. The theater received criticism for unsafe sex practices during the early years of the pandemic, but it also became a site for HIV/AIDS education and outreach, providing a space for activists to distribute condoms and material on safe homosexual sex practices. In 1985, the theater published a booklet of safe sex guidelines called "Safe Sex: It Can Save Your Life" and started exclusively using condoms in all pornographic films by 1987.

== See also ==
- 40 Years of Bijou (2011), documentary short film by Bryan Dowling
- LGBT culture in Chicago
