= Hay barrack =

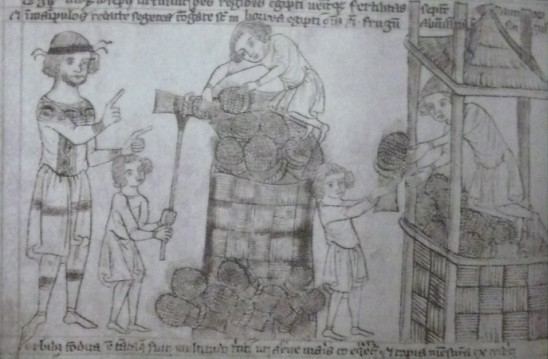
Illustration including a hay barrack in the Velislai biblia picta from 1325–1349, in the Czech Republic

A hay barrack (haybarrack) is an open structure (a barrack) with a movable roof for storing loose hay on a farm. Hay barracks were widespread in northern Europe in medieval times, also found in the Alps and North America, but are rare today. Early usage of this term was noted as being peculiar to New York state. Hay barracks were used in much of Europe and parts of colonial America, but were very common in the Netherlands, where they are called hooiberg or kapberg.

== Etymology ==
Other names for these structures in the U.K. are Dutch barn and helm (from Old English helm, Proto-Germanic helmaz and helmet: a protective covering).

== Construction ==
Barracks often have four posts but can have as few as one to as many as twelve posts. The hay may be piled on the ground or there may be a storeroom at ground level and the hay is stacked on top of the room. The posts are set into the ground called post in ground construction. This construction keeps the posts stable without needing bracing. The roof is typically thatched and lightly framed to limit the weight. The posts often have holes to place pins at various levels as the height of hay pile changes. The roof is raised and lowered by hand. More modern versions may have cables on winches on each post so the roof is easier to move.

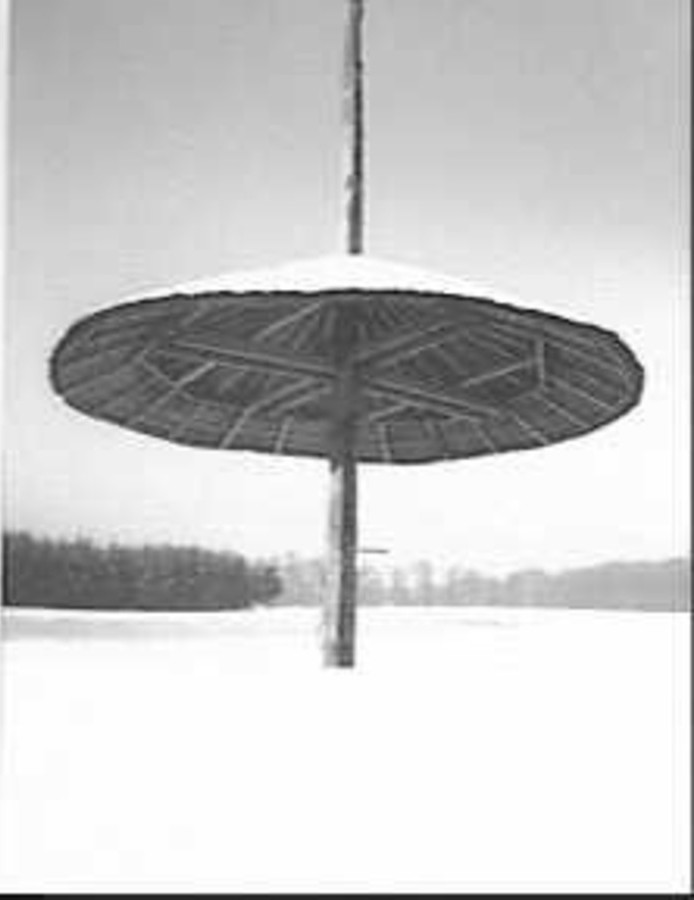
Hay barrack with a single post

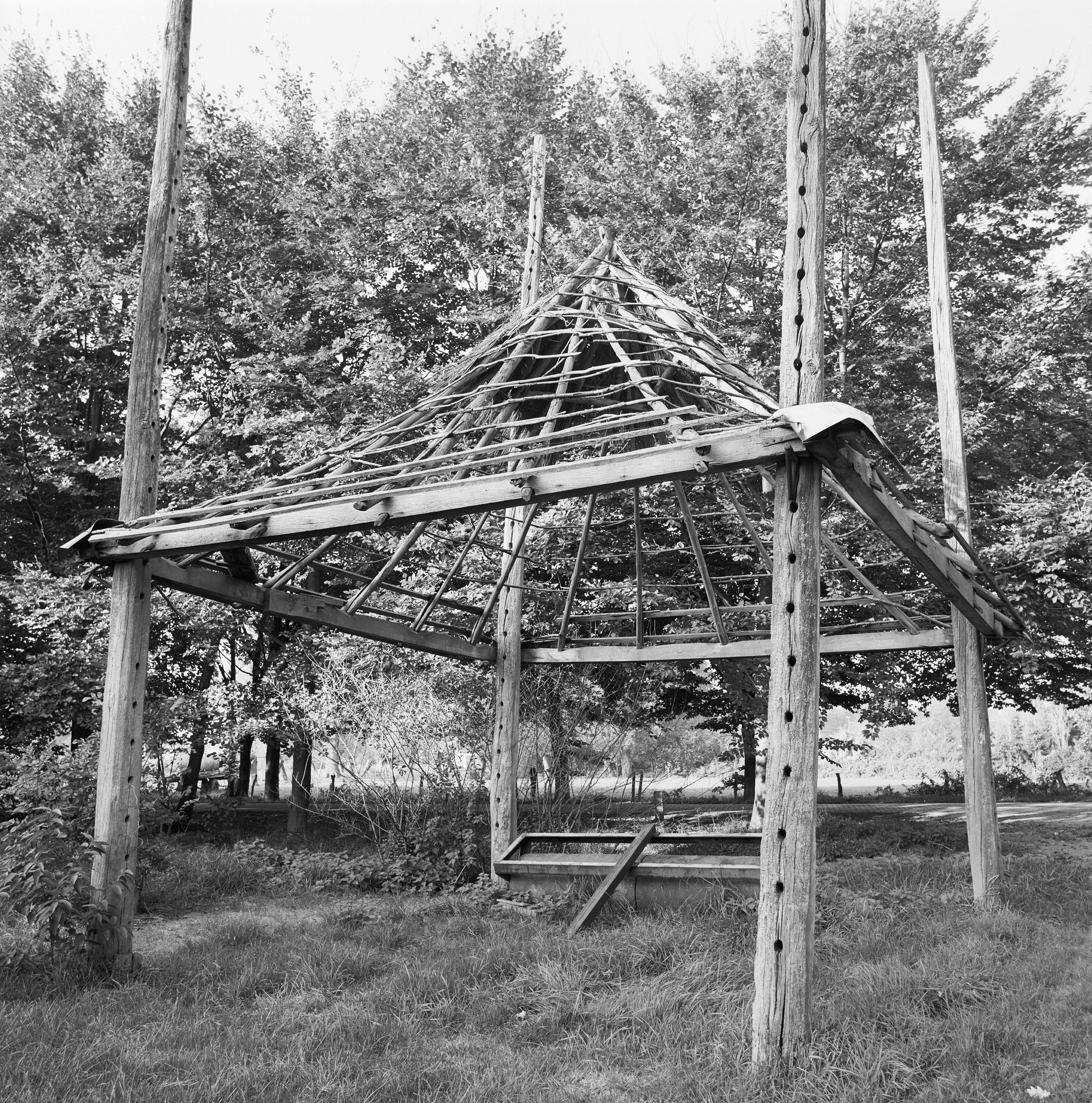
The structure of a barrack; the holes in the post are elevations where pins can be placed as the roof is raised and lowered

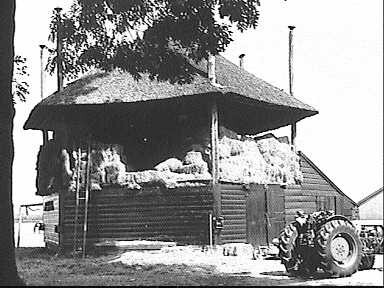
Hexagonal barrack with a storeroom below, the latter called a schuurberg in Dutch

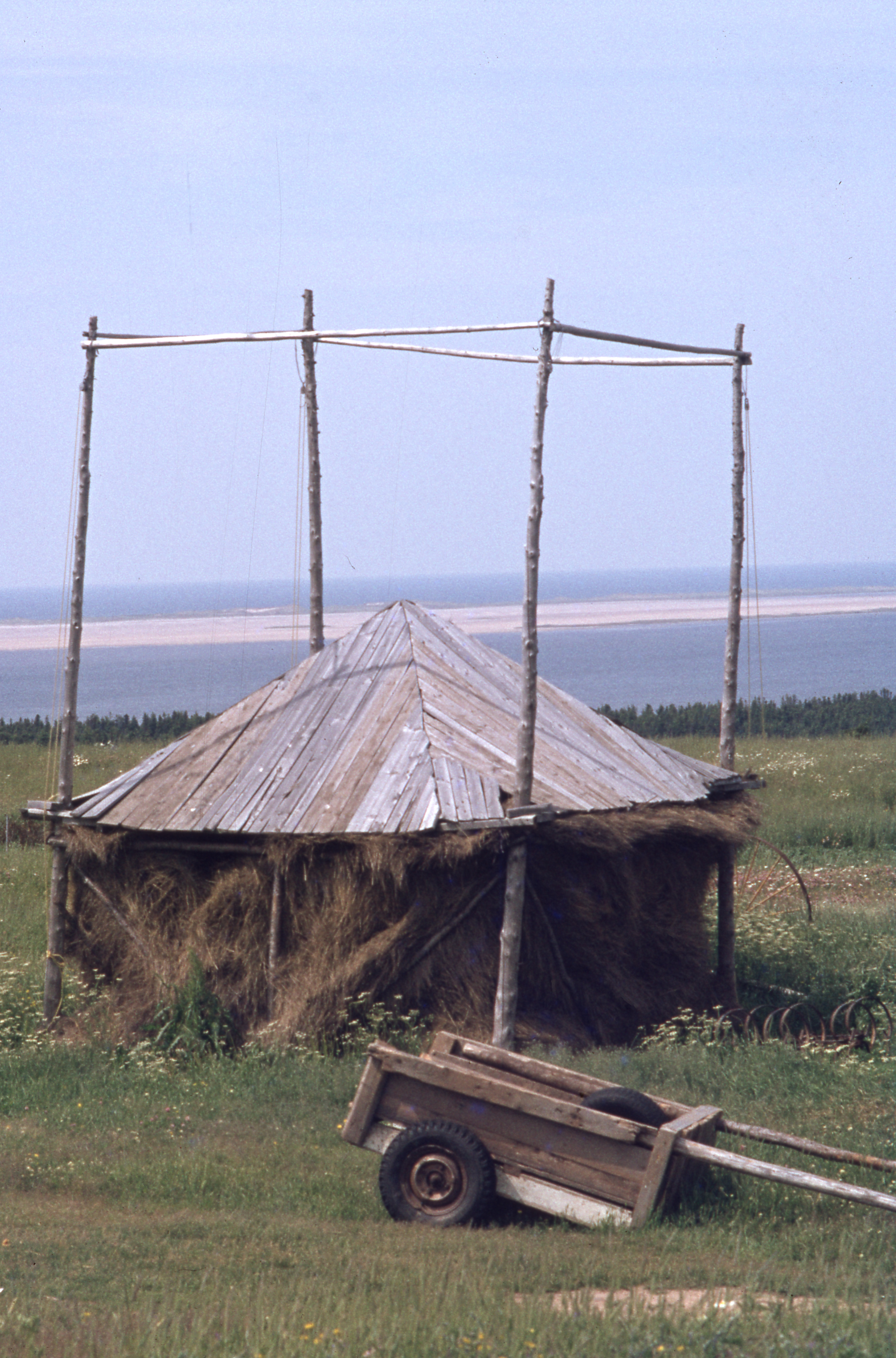
Hay barrack (Baraque à foin), Magdalen Island Quebec, Canada 1978

== See also ==
- Hay rack
