= Toby Ross =

American film director

Toby Ross (born 1955) is an American film director who made straight and gay pornographic films in the 1970s and 1980s and later on went to produce nonsexual and cult films with a strong sense of comedic flair. Many film aficionados consider Ross the only missing link between adult films and commercial independent films ("Ross—himself a prominent 70s queer filmmaker whose films bridged the gap between porn, exploitation, and art cinema"), as Ross calls it The Antarctica of the film business. He was born in Landsberg am Lech, Germany, to a Jewish mother and a Catholic father. At the age of eight, his mother having remarried an Austrian Jew, he moved with his mother and stepfather to Israel. He served two years in the Israeli army. After studies in Los Angeles, attracted by stories of the freedom in San Francisco, he moved there in the 1970s.

Before Ross made feature films he made loops, which were shot on silent 8mm or 16mm. His earliest feature films were partially composed of some of his loops with added soundtracks. Some of his later films were very successful in underground gay film circles. These films include Do Me Evil, Cruisin' 57, and Schoolmates.

His earlier theatrical features were released under Cinema Mirage. In 1980 he started a company called Hornbill Films which he used to release his hard core films onto VHS and in 1995 his regular general audience films some shown in various festivals. He produced several films for Bijou Video

In the early 1980s he began making movies on video instead of film.

He no longer makes hardcore porn movies, only "erotic story movies."

On October 8, 2008, Canadian film maker and experimental klezmer/hip hop musician Josh Dolgin showed Cruisin' 57 at the Pop Montreal music festival; the film was accompanied by a live band and played to a packed house with standing room only.

In the winter of 2010 Josh Dolgin released his Film "Socalled The Movie" in which parts of a documentary he made with Ross profiles Toby Ross as one of his influences.

== Awards and nominations ==
- 1998 Grabby Awards Hall of Fame.
- 2002 GayVN Awards Hall of Fame.
- 2008 Grabbys Awards Life Achievement Award.

== Films ==
=== From XXX to regular motion pictures ===
In 2005 s he began making regular comedy films which include Bowser Makes a Movie, Get a Life, and Father Knows.... In 2007, he and Joe Rubin directed the movie Live For Sex, Die For Love which was a departure from Ross' comedies into dark and semi-surreal drama. It was a success.

In the spring of 2008 he started working on a spy thriller called "Moon over Hong Kong", an all-male homage to the James Bond genre. "Like a Moth to a Flame" reunited Ross with Rubin and was available on DVD November 30, 2009. One of the trilogies of Moth was shot on 16mm and directed by Joe Rubin. 2011 was the year he released his dark erotic crime documentary "Payton Collins Serial Rapist", the film spent 3 weeks as #1 best seller on www.tla.com and was a success. Payton Collins was nominated as the best gay thriller for 2012 TLA GAYBIES award.

=== Father Knows... ===
Father Knows... is a 2007 American film starring Cort Donovan as Brad, who has just completed his memoirs. The film then goes into an extended flashback about Brad's relationship with his childhood friend Ira and the ups and downs which follow. Their romance takes them from Chicago to San Francisco and back and along the way they both learn a lot about life and each other. The film was shot in Chicago, Illinois on digital video.

=== Homosexual, Toby Ross and the 70s and Paper Dreams ===
From 2012 to 2014 Ross made a few documentaries, notably "Toby Ross and the 70's" with an Ebook version (much racier than the video) in which the San Francisco era (1971 - 1977) is retold in a new light.

Paper Dreams 2015 The history of the erotic all male magazine industry (1966 - 1973) retold in a "film noir" style to enhance suspense.

== Filmography ==
- Cruisin '57 (1975)
- Do Me Evil (1975)
- Reflections of Youth (1975)
- Boys of the Slums (1976)
- Schoolmates (1976)
- White Trash (1977)
- Click Click (1980)
- Duplicated (1980)
- Twins (1981)
- Family Affair (1982)
- Golden Years (1982)
- The Diary (1982)
- The Last Surfer (1983)
- Delusions of Grandeur (1985)
- Ivy League (1985)
- Streetstar (1985)
- Classmates (1986)
- Double Trouble (1986)
- Mr Wonderful (1987)
- Tough Guys Do Dance (1990)
- A Midnight Clear (1992)
- Baby It's You (1993)
- Stop! In the Name of Sex (1995)
- Principal of Lust (1997)
- I Live for Sex (1998)
- Rock and Roll Dreams (1998)
- Even Steven (1999)
- Happiness is a Big Cock (1999)
- After School Group Sex (2001)
- Hung Twinks on Wheels (2001)
- Splendor in the Ass (2001)
- Young Bazookas (2001)
- Young Masseurs (2001)
- Schoolmates 2001 (2002)
- Twinkie Twinkie Little Star (2002)
- Bowser Makes A Movie (2005)
- Get a Life (2006)
- Father Knows... (2007)
- Live For Sex Die For Love (2008)
- Straight Boys Gay Boys 1 (2008)
- Straight Boys Gay Boys 2 (2009)
- Straight Boys Gay Boys 3 (2010)
- Straight Boys Gay Boys 4 (2015)
- Moon Over Hong Kong (2008)
- Like a Moth to a Flame (2009)
- Payton Collins Serial Rapist (2011)
- To Fetch a Predator (2012)
- Homosexual (2013)
- Toby Ross and the 70s (2014)
- Paper Dreams (2015)
- Bill Eld: American Pop Culture Icon (2020)
- Hello Darkness (2025)

== See also ==
- List of male performers in gay porn films
- List of pornographic movie studios
- List of Grabby recipients
