= Purusha Larkin =

American author and filmmaker (1934-1988)

Purusha Androgyne Larkin
- Purusha in his home, circa 1983
- Born: Peter Allison Larkin; January 17, 1934; St. Louis, Missouri
- Died: June 22, 1988 (aged 54); San Diego, California
- Other names: Christopher Larkin

Purusha Androgyne Larkin (17 January 1934 – 22 June 1988), born Peter Allison Larkin and also known as Christopher Larkin, was an American author and filmmaker.

== Biography ==
Larkin was born as Peter Allison Larkin on January 17, 1934 in St. Louis, Missouri. After graduating from John Burroughs School, Larkin studied literature, philosophy, and religion at Rollins College and University of Notre Dame. He devoted ten years to Roman Catholic religious and monastic life, during which he obtained a master's degree in theology from the University of Toronto and served as a theologian and counselor at Yale University's St. Thomas More House.

In the late 1960s, Larkin withdrew from religious life and moved to New York City. Using the stage name Christopher Larkin, he produced and directed the semi-autobiographical 1974 film A Very Natural Thing. The film is considered to be the first commercially distributed feature film about gay life made by a gay man. Following the movie's release, Larkin traveled extensively around the world before settling in Ocean Beach, San Diego in 1977.

In San Diego, Larkin began to explore tantric sexuality, meditation, massage, body modification and fisting. Around this time he adopted the name "Purusha Androgyne Larkin." In 1981, he published The Divine Androgyne According To Purusha. Larkin took his own life on June 22, 1988 after two years of struggling with HIV/AIDS.
