= Bruno (model) =

Cuban-American model and adult performer

- Born: Cuba
- Occupations: Model, adult film actor
- Known for: Gay pornography

Bruno is a model and adult performer famous for his work in adult magazines and pornographic films for gay men. AEBN refers to Bruno as "perhaps the quintessential gay porn icon from the 'gay macho' period of the 1970s and early 80s." Little is publicly known about his personal life or career outside of the gay adult industry.

== Biography ==
Bruno was born in Cuba and moved to Miami, Florida, when he was 10 years old. As a young man he considered a career in professional weightlifting, but decided against it. Bruno began modeling for gay publications at age 18; his first photo shoot was fully nude and involved other men, but no physical contact. Bruno later met Lou Thomas (also known as Jon Target), who was then working for Colt Studio. In a 1979 interview with Mandate, Bruno recalled,

He gave me his card, and said that when I was ready to model to give him a call. About two or three months later I called him and went to New York. Then I went to California to be photographed by Rip Colt. Both sets of photographs were used in the Gallery magazine that Colt did on me.

In 1977, Bruno posed for a photograph for the cover of Rod McKuen's 1977 album Slide Easy In. Only Bruno's arm is visible in the photograph, gripping shortening from fictional brand "Disco" in his fist; the photograph is generally regarded as a reference to gay sex, especially fisting, for which Crisco was commonly used as lubricant at the time. An inscription on the cover states:

If this album sounds different, it tried to be. The performers, producers, the players (whether part of the enormous rhythm section or the full symphony complement of strings) knew this was a project everyone had to get into; not just on the surface, but deeply—and together. If you don't feel "easy in" then perhaps your threshold of pain or pleasure needs looking into.

In 1979, a portrait of Bruno by Tom of Finland was featured in Target By Tom; The Natural Man, a series of portraits and photographs that Tom co-produced with Lou Thomas.

In addition to modeling, Bruno starred in numerous pornographic films by Colt Studio and Bijou Video, including Pleasures In The Sun (1980) and the Bullet Videopac series #2, #6, and #9. In his 1979 Mandate interview, Bruno stated that he also had a job "in the rate department" of an airline as well as a degree in business.

In 2019, The Advocate described Bruno as having "the mustache that launched a thousand fantasies."

Bruno reportedly continued to star in gay porn well into the early 2000s, sometimes under the stage name "Hermes." His astrological zodiac sign is libra.
