= A Hand in the Bush =

A Hand in the Bush: The Fine Art of Vaginal Fisting
- Front Cover
- Author: Deborah Addington
- Language: English
- Publisher: Greenery Press
- Publication date: 1997
- Media type: Paperback
- Pages: 112
- ISBN: 978-1-890159-02-3

A Hand in the Bush: The Fine Art of Vaginal Fisting is a 1997 book by Deborah Addington about the sexual practice of inserting a fist into a vagina. It reached number four on Amazon's "Hot 100" sales chart in February 2000.
