= Play party (BDSM) =

Social event involving BDSM activities

In BDSM culture, a play party is a social event in which attendees socialize with like-minded people and engage in BDSM activities. Generally there is an area for drinking and socializing, an area for changing into more appropriate attire (such as fetishwear), and an area for "play" - sexually arousing or sadomasochistic activities.

Organizers often provide certain large pieces of BDSM equipment to which people can be bound or restrained. Party goers usually bring their own whips, canes, restraints etc. In larger play parties, there are usually dungeon monitors who enforce party rules such as safe, sane and consensual and risk-aware consensual kink.

It is not mandatory to play at a party; instead, attendees are welcome to merely take the role of a voyeur. It is not acceptable, however, to touch anyone or their BDSM equipment or sex toys without permission or to interrupt a scene in any way.

A play party can be a place for safer first date scenes. Often a Do Not Invite List is kept to keep out known persistent rule breakers.

In 2000, a play party in Attleboro, Massachusetts was invaded by police for alleged violations of assault and morality laws.

== See also ==
- Fetish club
- Munch (BDSM)
- Safeword
