= Robert Joel =

American actor (1944–1992)

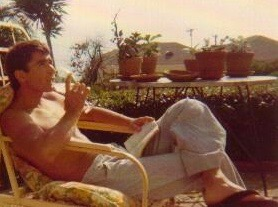
- Robert in Laguna Beach, California, 1975
- Born: Robert Joel McLane; August 4, 1944; Macon, Georgia
- Died: September 30, 1992 (aged 48); Riverside, California
- Known for: A Very Natural Thing

Robert Joel McLane (August 4, 1944 – September 30, 1992) was an American actor known for having starred in the early openly gay film A Very Natural Thing in 1974.

== Early life ==
He was born Robert Joel McLane, son of Henry McLane and his wife Sylvia Lamb. He was sometimes credited under the name Robert McLane. He was born in 1944 in Macon, Georgia. and grew up on a farm in Wagener, South Carolina. He graduated from Furman University in 1965.

== Acting career ==
Joel had various roles in theater. He was debuted on Broadway in 1969 as "He Who Hears Thunder" in Arthur Kopit's Indians in 1969. A year later, he had a leading role in the NET Playhouse television drama They Have Taken Over that was an adaptation of the novel by Marya Mannes. He had a minor role in the Alan Arkin-directed Little Murders (1971).

He starred in Blue Summer (1973) with Bo White and again with White in A Very Natural Thing (1974) under the name Robert Joel. Joel played the lead, David, a gay ex-monk, who finds love in New York City. The film has been viewed as being the first film to show gay love. His other co-stars were Curt Gareth, Jay Pierce, and Vito Russo, who went on to write The Celluloid Closet. Joel also appeared in Russ Meyer's Up! (1976), Barbara (1970), and a 1971 PBS television drama, They.

== Playwright ==
He wrote one-act plays, one of which, Triptych, was presented in 1990 at the Glenn Wallichs Theater at the University of the Redlands, and was directed by Kent Paul.

== Later life and death ==
He moved to Riverside where he wrote plays and taught. He worked for the AIDS Project, coordinating the work of volunteer therapists who worked with persons with AIDS and their families. He died in 1992 of AIDS. A panel honoring him appears on the AIDS memorial quilt.
