= Munch (BDSM) =

Social gathering for those interested in BDSM

A munch (derived from "Meeting Over Lunch") is a casual social gathering for people involved in or interested in kink, BDSM, alternative relationship lifestyles, or fetishes. Most munches are "vanilla" events where no BDSM, kink, or fetish activities take place. A play munch is a munch that incorporates a play party where participants can participate in BDSM and fetish activities.

== Characteristics ==
Munches often take place at a restaurant, bar, coffee shop, or other public setting. A munch organizer usually reserves a large table, a back area, or a private room. People are free to arrive and leave within the specified hours. The primary purpose is socializing and meeting like-minded individuals. Munches are intended as opportunities for those who are curious about kink to meet others, become more comfortable, and better informed.

Unlike a play party, munches are informal affairs that discourage fetish attire or BDSM play, though wearing of subtle collars or leather items may be permissible if they are nondescript. Munches can be geared towards specific groups, such as LGBTIQA or BIPOC, while others may be focused on specific dynamics such as female domination, male domination or pet play. Etiquette and rules tend to vary across munches.

== Marketing ==
Munch organizers may post their event information on social networking sites, or use e-mail or mailing lists. Local BDSM/Kink groups may announce a munch in-person at a meeting, on a community calendar or newsletter, or on their own websites.

== History ==
The Usenet group alt.sex.bondage was a common meeting ground online; as was a San Francisco–area email list known as BABES (Bay Area Bondage Enthusiasts Society). While organizations such as the Society of Janus and the BackDrop Club existed, there were few informal ways to meet others socially within the fetish scene. After that initial meeting, an informal rotation of organizers and locations were instituted, with widely varying amounts of success.

The Kirk's Burger Munch attracted a large and often spirited crowd, some of which participated in discreet play. As time went on, the atmosphere became more overtly fetish and BDSM play oriented, and people started bringing in outside food. Ultimately, the management insisted that the group stop meeting there. Many of the original participants organized another social gathering just down the street, though STella (a member of BABES) requested they not use the name "burger munch". The name was shortened to "munch".

The term "Burger Munch" was also used in Boston in 1993.

== See also ==
- Fetish club
- Kink (sexuality)
- List of BDSM topics
