= Hay rack =

Light wooden or metal structure for feeding animals

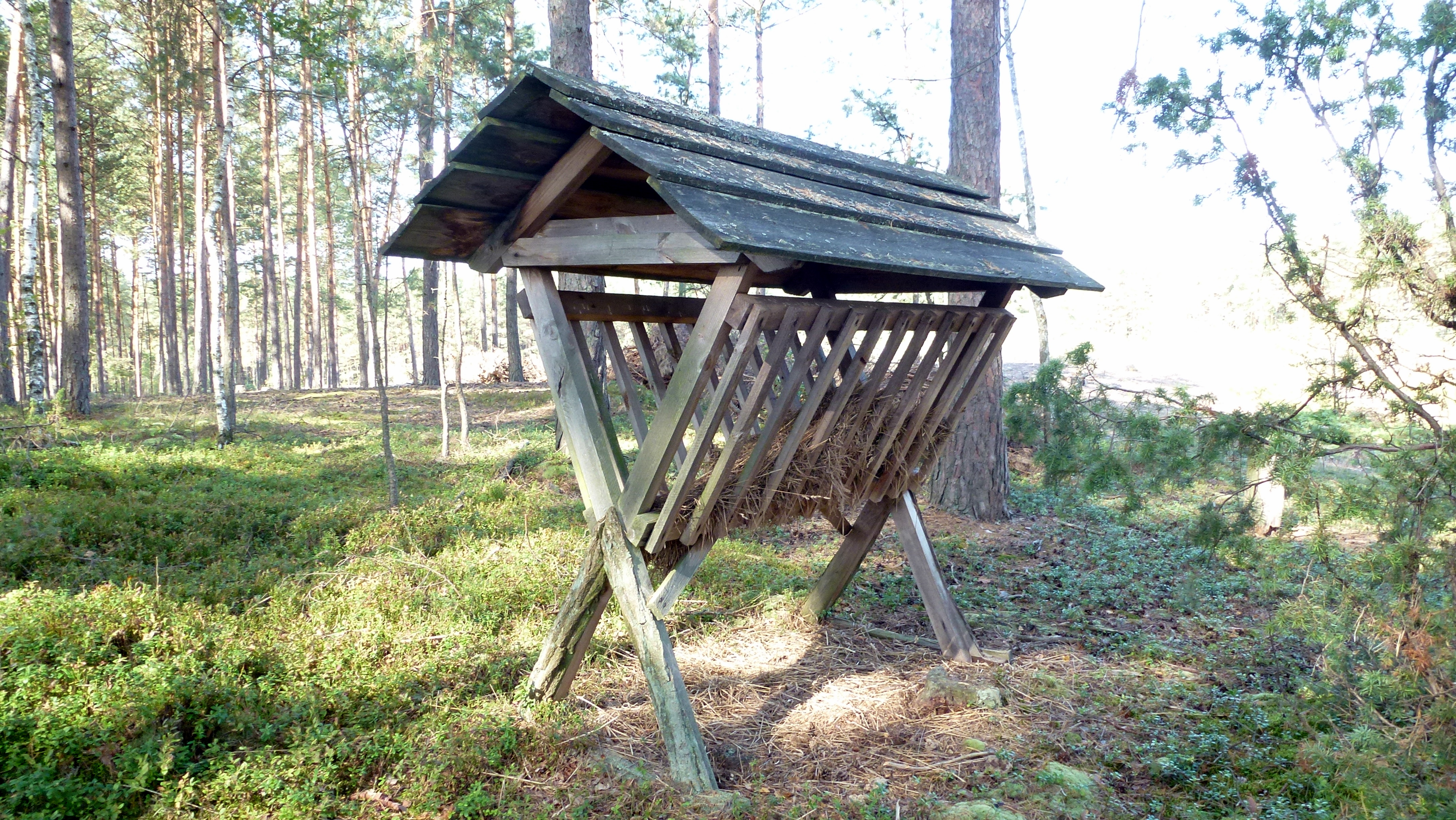
Hay rack

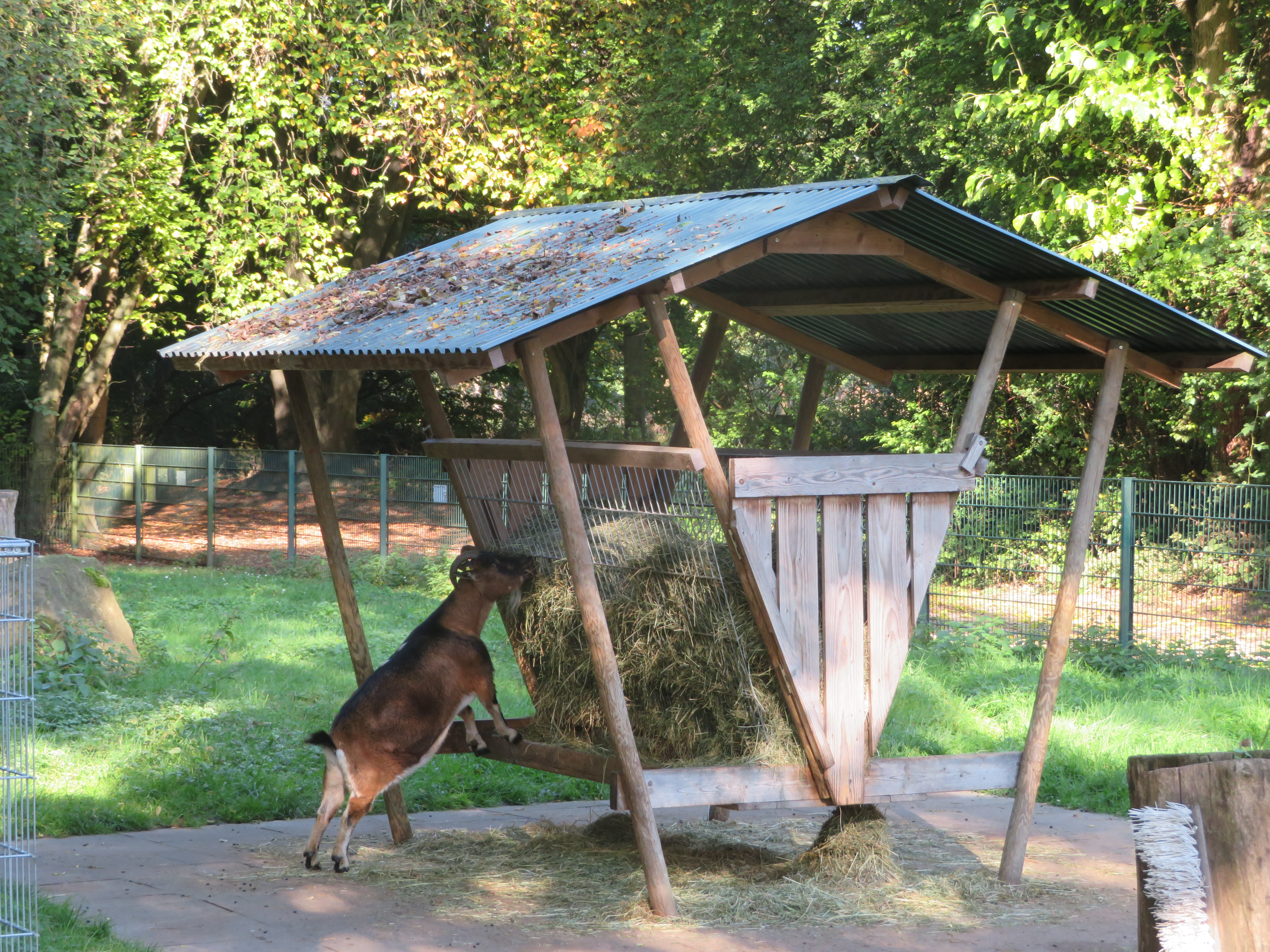
Hay rack in an animal enclosure

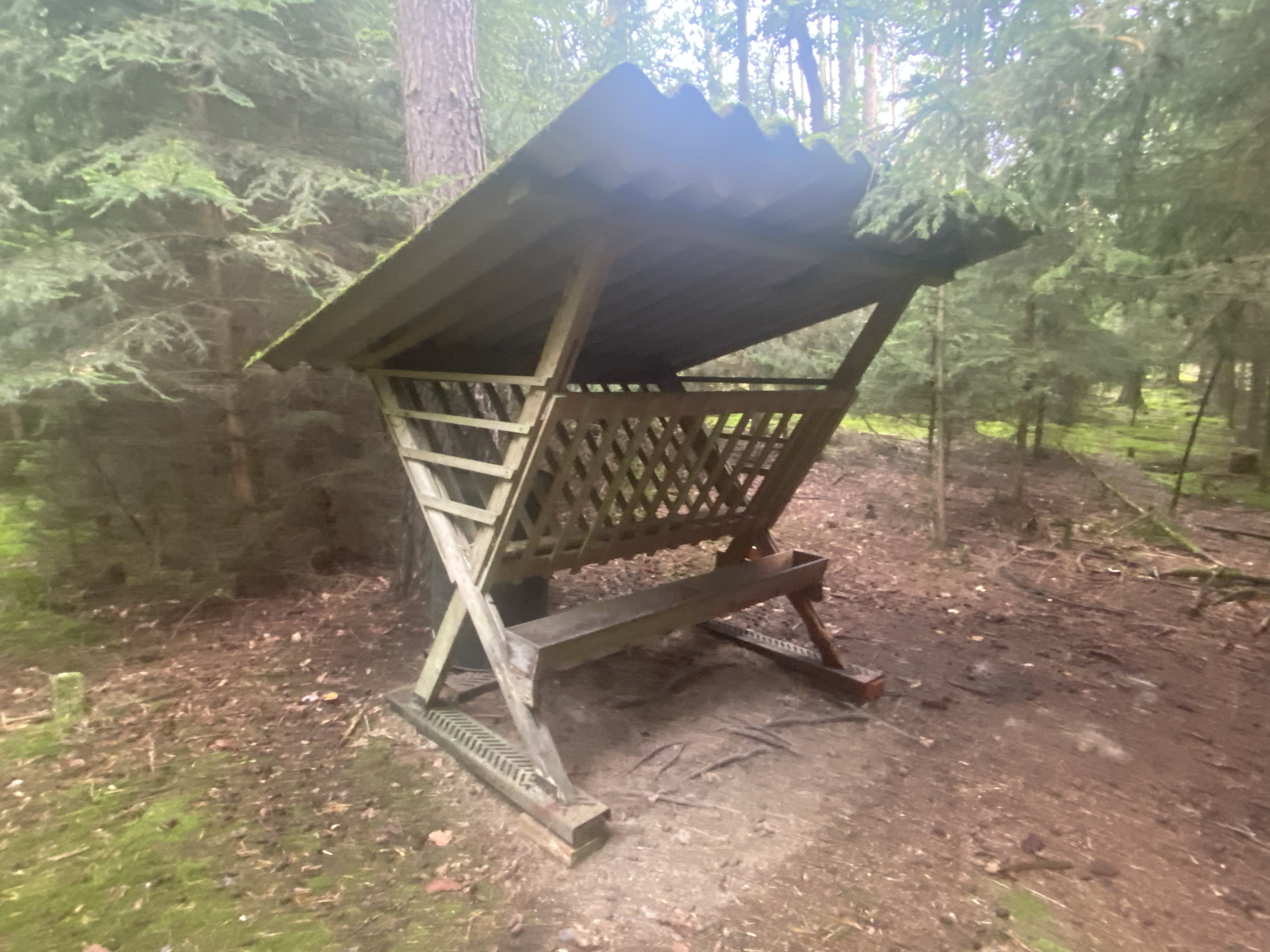
Hay rack in the forest

A hay rack is a light wooden or metal structure for feeding animals. It may be used to feed domestic livestock such as cattle, horses, and goats, or it may placed in the woods to feed deer. Feeding deer is mostly done in the winter, when the other food sources (green forage) are scarce. Hay racks are filled with hay, and in addition to hay there is often also a mineral lick near the rack where the animals can obtain essential mineral nutrients.

== See also ==
- Manger
- Hayrack
- Hay barrack
