= The Divine Androgyne According To Purusha =

1981 book by Purusha Larkin

The Divine Androgyne According To Purusha: Adventures In Cosmic Erotic Ecstasy and Androgyne Bodyconsciousness
- Author: Purusha Larkin
- Cover artist: Robert Uyvari
- Language: English
- Publisher: Sanctuary Publications
- Publication date: 1981
- Publication place: United States
- Media type: Hardcover
- Pages: 200

The Divine Androgyne According To Purusha: Adventures In Cosmic Erotic Ecstasy and Androgyne Bodyconsciousness is a 1981 book by Purusha Larkin.

== Summary ==
The book advocates for liberation from sexual repression through the release of physical inhibitions and celebration of physical pleasure, as well as the fusion of sexual ecstasy and religious spirituality. Themes explored in the book include androgyny, tantric sex, body modification, genital piercing, and fisting. In an April 1983 interview, Larkin described the book as teaching males to merge masculinity and femininity, hence his self-styling as a "divine androgyne".

== Reception ==
The book received a mixed reception. Mark Thompson characterized the book as "a deeply felt, spiritually evolved statement on the potentialities of eros and bliss," but indicated that many other critics derided the book as egotistical. The San Francisco Sentinel referred to the book as "a combination of gay sex manual, coffee table conversation piece, and meditational guide to the universe," noting that "Larkin states his arguments clearly and intelligently," but critiquing "his failure to explain how his average reader can find time or energy to pursue sexual ecstasy with the dogged devotion prescribed in The Divine Androgyne." Larkin's emphasis on fisting as a form of cosmic pleasure was further stymied by the spread of HIV/AIDS in the United States, which prompted caution against anal intercourse.

== In popular culture ==
According to the Tom of Finland Foundation, the book introduced a "distinctive form of Gay spirituality." In 2024, the foundation hosted an exhibition by artist-in-residence Sam Ashby that explored "queer spirituality and utopian sexualities through the figure of Purusha." Later that year, the exhibit traveled to the San Mei Gallery in London.
