= Adult movie theater =

Movie theater designed for the exhibition of pornographic films

"Adult movie theater" is a euphemistic term for a movie theater dedicated to the exhibition of pornographic films.

Adult movie theaters may cater either to a heterosexual or a homosexual audience. For the patrons, rules regarding nudity and public masturbation or sex are generally lax; such behavior may be condoned explicitly or simply tolerated by the management. This may or may not be legal, and if not, may or may not be overlooked by local law enforcement. Certain theaters may also include a strip show or sex show between films, or other sex industry services.

Before VCR, and later the Internet, movie theatres were often the only locations where people could see hardcore erotic films. The spread of home videos and later of Internet pornography has led to a drastic reduction in the number of adult theatres.

== By region ==
=== United States and Canada ===
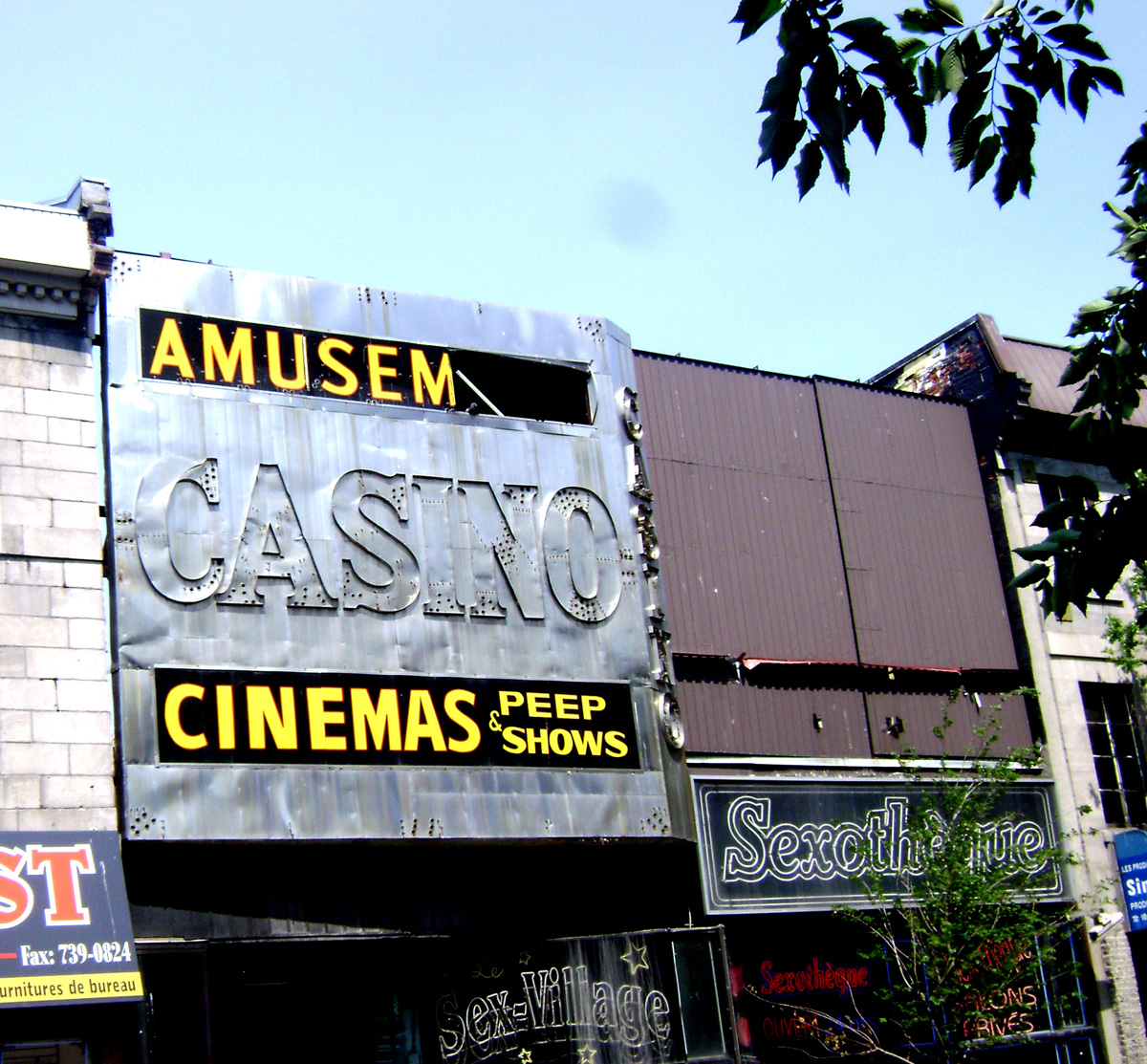
Adult movie theatres and peep shows on Montreal's Saint Laurent Boulevard

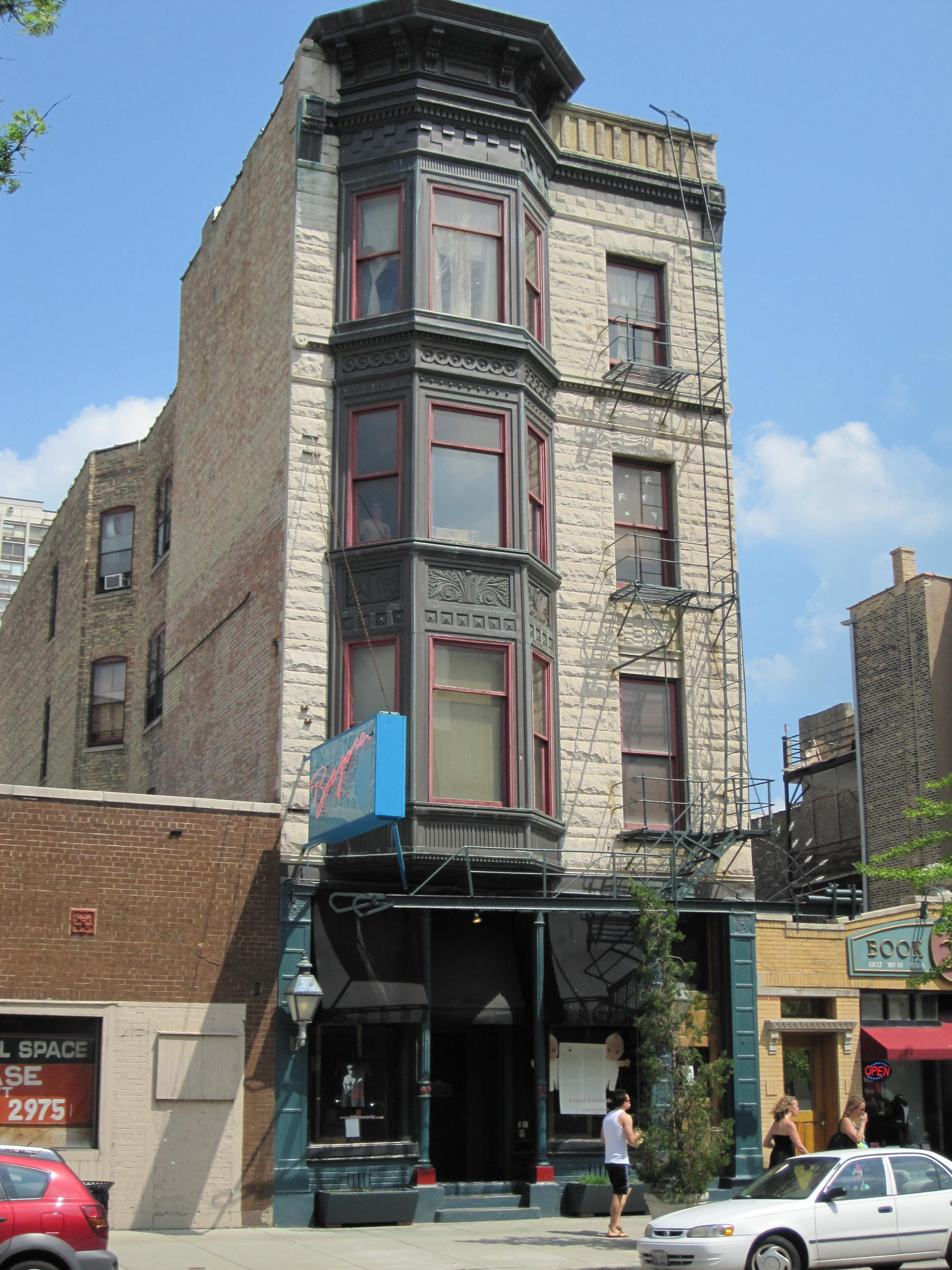
Bijou Theater, Chicago, Illinois

The earliest erotic theatres in the U.S. were in California, and showed 35-millimeter low-production-quality independently produced films. In 1960, there existed about twenty theatres in the U.S. that showed erotic movies exclusively. In the late 1960s and early 1970s, they spread to the rest of the country. The O'Farrell Theatre in San Francisco, one of America's oldest and best known adult-entertainment establishments, opened as an adult movie theatre in 1969.

Small "storefront" theatres with only a dozen seats sprang up, and by 1970, 750 pornographic theatres existed in the U.S. In the 1970s, theatres shifted from showing 35-millimetre sexploitation films to more explicit 16-millimetre "beaver" films. In the 1980s, some theatre owners began forming chains to cut their costs, and, by 1989, the number of U.S. erotic theatres had fallen below 250.

Restrictions on adult theatres vary by region. Local governments commonly prohibit adult theatres from operating within a certain distance of residential areas, parks, churches and/or schools. Often, erotic theatres have been forced to move to the outskirts of cities in order to protect real estate prices in city centers. Renton, Washington was involved in a 1986 Supreme Court case regarding this issue. In its decision on Renton v. Playtime Theatres, Inc., the Court upheld Renton's statute that no adult theatre could be located within 1,000 feet of a school, park, church, or residential zone, rejecting the theatre owners' argument that the statute violated the First Amendment, since the statute did not seek to ban the existence of adult theaters outright.

Before Rudolph Giuliani became mayor, Times Square was New York City's largest "adult" district.

The Bijou Theater in Chicago was the longest-running gay adult theater and sex club in the United States. It closed September 30, 2015.

Today, the largest operator of adult theaters in the United States is Deja Vu Services, Inc. It is controlled by Harry Mohney, whose chain operated 160 adult theaters between the mid-1960s and mid-1980s.

=== Japan ===
Adult theatres are mainly located in urban areas such as the business districts and entertainment districts of Tokyo, Osaka and Nagoya. Although most of them are managed independently, some are directly managed by pink film production and distribution companies. In the old days, sensational posters were posted outside the buildings, but due to various regulations, they are now limited to a minimum of posters. At present, many theaters are closed due to the aging of managers, buildings, or the redevelopment of the area. Some movie theaters continue to be managed by rebuilding or moving to existing closed theaters. There are a few new openings.

=== Netherlands ===
There are approximately sixty adult movie theaters in the Netherlands.

In 2010, a law on sex companies was under consideration. In addition to municipal rules a national rule was introduced, requiring adult movie theatres to have a pornography display license. An advertisement of the company should contain its license number. The theater must have a sign outside showing the company is licensed, whilst inside, a copy of the license must be displayed.

Non-commercial sexual activities by and amongst clients would not require an additional license, but prostitution on-premises would require an additional prostitution company license.

== Arcades ==
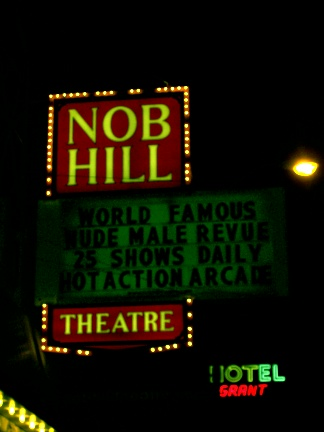
Sign outside San Francisco's Nob Hill Theatre, advertising an adult video arcade

An adult video arcade is a pornographic movie viewing area where masturbation is tolerated and expected (and sometimes openly encouraged). It is almost always attached to a sex shop or an adult book store, where magazines, movies, and sexual aids are sold. An arcade, which is a type of peep show, consists of typically a dozen or more private (or sometimes semi-private) viewing booths, containing a video monitor, a panel of controls, and a seat. Sometimes the booths have paper towels and a wastebasket. Sometimes these booths are arranged in a maze-like fashion. Often the lighting will be dim, perhaps only red or green lights near each booth, indicating their availability. In their origin they were exclusively male.

In their origin, they operated under the pretext that videos were being previewed before buying. It was one film per booth, no choice after entering. While a few existed in the age of the 8mm movie, the relative simplicity of the VCR caused them to multiply. The source was now racks of self-rewinding VCR tape players, instead of the cumbersome projectors. Still, a system required a certain amount of maintenance – breakdowns needed to be repaired, and there were a lot of things to break – which implied good management.

=== Transactions ===
Movie time is purchased either by coin or cash activation within the booth, or by purchasing tokens or a block of time in advance. Generally a selection of 15 to 50 movies running in Blu-ray/DVD players is available for viewing, sometimes diverse (e.g., straight, gay, fetish), other times monotonously similar. On some systems four videos may be viewed simultaneously in quadrants of the screen. New video systems operate with computers and provide a selection of several thousand movies.

=== Fixtures ===
It is possible for arcades in Europe to have two-person booths, where the seating accommodates a pair sitting together. But this is unusual, and outside Europe unknown.

In the U.S., in some adult book stores, the arcades will have "buddy booths." These booths are adjacent, and allow for interplay between occupants. They may have windows so "buddies" may watch each other masturbate. Between other booths there may be glory holes for oral sex, tolerated by the management (which otherwise would seal the holes).

If a glory hole is to be found between two booths in a video booth at an adult bookstore, the person who wishes to perform oral sex will normally be seated in his or her booth. Although not a hard and fast rule, that seated (and sometimes kneeling) position commonly signals to others that they are there in order to perform oral sex – which allows those who wish to receive oral sex to take the adjoining booth. That second person, who wishes to have oral sex performed on them, will take the adjoining booth and normally remain standing. Most adult book stores require and enforce that movies be operating at all times while arcade booths are occupied.

== See also ==
- Casual sex
- Dogging (sexual slang)
- Cottaging
- Gay bathhouse
- Glory hole (sexual slang)
- Strip club
- Times Square Red, Times Square Blue
- Troll (gay slang)

== Bibliography ==
- Slade, Joseph W. (2001). Pornography and sexual representation: a reference guide. Greenwood Publishing Group. ISBN 0-313-31521-3.
