= Assigny, Cher =

Assigny
- Commune
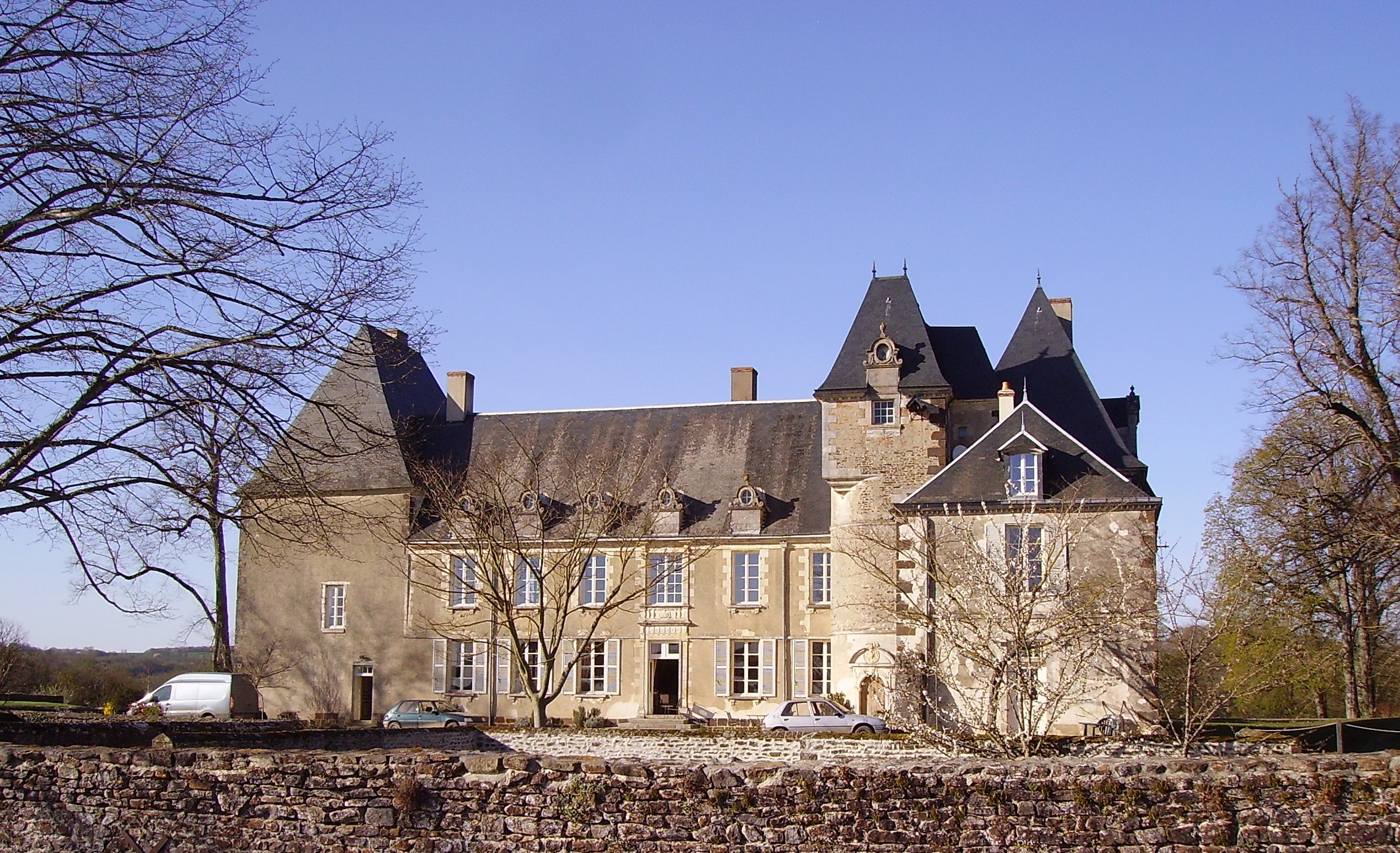
- Chateau of La Vallée

- Coat of arms
- Location of Assigny
- Location within France Location within Centre-Val de Loire
- Coordinates: 47°25′42″N 2°45′20″E
- Country: France
- Region: Centre-Val de Loire
- Department: Cher
- Arrondissement: Bourges
- Canton: Sancerre
- Intercommunality: CC Pays Fort Sancerrois Val Loire

Government
  - Mayor (2020–2026): Patrick Godon
- Area^{1}: 17.05 km^{2} (6.58 sq mi)
- Elevation: 362 m (1,188 ft)
- Highest elevation: 357 m (1,171 ft)
- Lowest elevation: 213 m (699 ft)
- Population (2023): 159
  - Density: 9.33/km^{2} (24.2/sq mi)
- Time zone: UTC+01:00 (CET)
  - Summer (DST): UTC+02:00 (CEST)
- INSEE/Postal code: 18014 /18260
- ^{1} French Land Register data, which excludes lakes, ponds, glaciers > 1 km^{2} (0.386 sq mi or 247 acres) and river estuaries.

Assigny (French pronunciation: [asiɲi]) is a commune in the Cher department in the Centre-Val de Loire region of France, about 28 miles (45 km) northeast of Bourges.

== Population ==
Historical population
Year	Pop.	±% p.a.
1968	294	—
1975	228	−3.57%
1982	207	−1.37%
1990	172	−2.29%
1999	167	−0.33%
2007	155	−0.93%
2012	158	+0.38%
2017	152	−0.77%
2023	159	+0.75%
Source: INSEE

== See also ==
- Communes of the Cher department
