= Men of Israel =

2009 American gay pornographic film

- Directed by: Michael Lucas
- Starring: David Wright; Matan Shalev; Avi Dar; Naor Tal; Guy Ronen; Ninrod Gonen; Morr Foxx
- Cinematography: mr. Pam
- Edited by: mr. Pam
- Production company: Lucas Entertainment
- Distributed by: Lucas Distribution
- Release date: 2009
- Countries: United States; Israel
- Languages: English; Hebrew

Men of Israel is a 2009 gay pornographic film released by Lucas Entertainment studio. Journalists from The Atlantic, Out Magazine and Yediot Aharonot noted it as a landmark film as the first pornographic movie shot on location with an all-Israeli cast; while Tablet magazine and the Los Angeles Times remarked on it being the first to feature an all-Jewish cast. Director Michael Lucas—who is Jewish and obtained his Israeli citizenship (made aliyah) in 2009—undertook the film as "a bold move to promote Israeli culture and tourism" and to counterbalance what he saw as biased portrayals of Israel in mainstream media.

== Background ==
Director Michael Lucas was born in Soviet Russia and experienced antisemitism at an early age, which led him to form a strong connection with his Jewish identity and the state of Israel. Lucas is particularly well known for his activism and outspokenness on a variety of issues in LGBT and Jewish cultures. Hezbollah's attacks in the 2006 Lebanon War stirred Lucas to go to Israel to entertain gay soldiers who are allowed to serve openly in the military. The trip stirred debate in Israeli society, which is pulled between a progressive, almost secular Tel Aviv—named the "gay capital of the Middle East" by Out Magazine—and the conservative, Ultra Orthodox community centered in Jerusalem.

His New York Blade columns on Ultra-Orthodox Judaism and Islam sparked a campus debate at Stanford University in February 2008 when Lucas was invited to give a speech to students. The New Republic and the New York City media have called him the "Lion of Chelsea" and the "last of the New York porn moguls". He contends that his film Michael Lucas' La Dolce Vita (2006) is the most expensive gay porn film ever made, with a budget of $250,000 and multiple celebrity cameos. In 2009, Lucas was inducted into the GayVN Hall of Fame, noted for "his stature as an A-list director and performer".

According to Lucas the intent of the film is to help viewers see Israel for its geographic features and history, and a place not much different than Prague or Palm Springs: an inviting LGBT vacation destination where handsome men have sex. "The global media has created an image of Israel as war-torn nation, which streets are lined with destroyed debris and crumbling ruins," wrote Lucas on the film's site. "Never are we shown Tel Aviv, Haifa, the Red Sea, the Dead Sea resorts, the beautiful beaches, the amazing architecture and the embracing culture that allows its citizens to thrive."

== Reaction ==
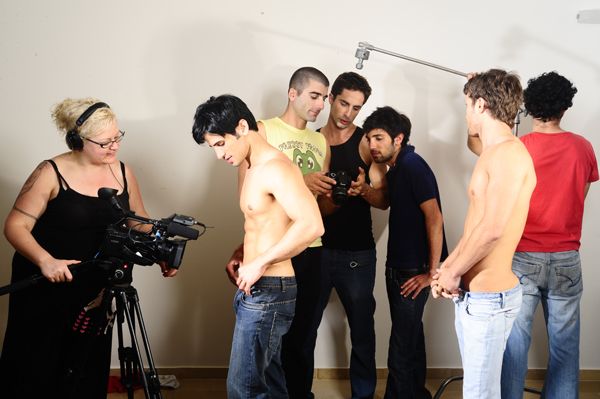
Lucas, under the microphone, on the set of Men of Israel, the first adult film to use exclusively Jewish models.

The film received widespread press coverage, particularly for its use of an all-Jewish, Israeli cast. Tablet Magazine's Wayne Hoffman noted that Jewish porn stars like Harry Reems of Deep Throat and Ron Jeremy adopted deracinated porn names. Writing on the Los Angeles Times website, Patrick Goldstein observed that the stars of the film use plausibly Jewish and/or Israeli names, and that "whenever Jews are more open about their Jewish identity -- as the Adam Sandler, Judd Apatow and Sarah Silverman generation of comedians has been in recent years -- it sounds like a healthy development, as it would be for any minority culture." Haaretz openly wondered "Can gay porn save Israel's image?"

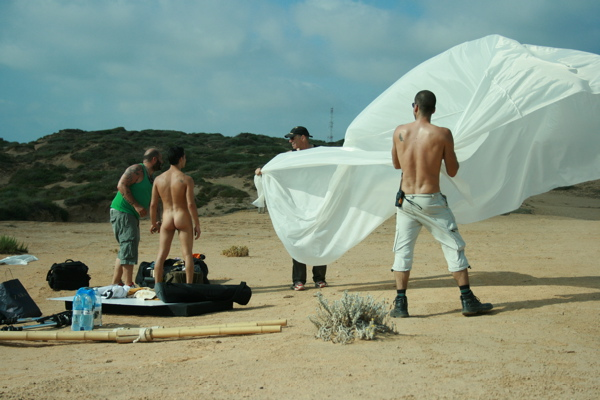
Photograph on the set of Lucas Entertainment's Men of Israel film shoot, with director Michael Lucas discussing the shoot with the cast

After the film's release in July 2009, Lucas wrote a letter on August 31 to the website GoGay, Israel's largest LGBT Internet site, admonishing closeted Israeli gays. He wrote the letter after Israeli men "started hitting me up on the web site, inviting me to hook up, then said they're not out. They're delusional. They're cruising this web site, benefiting from the fights of other people. They think the gay movement has nothing to do with them, that the shooting of gay youths in Tel Aviv has nothing to do with them. What reason is there to be in the closet in Israel in 2009? It's embarrassing."

Max Blumenthal claimed that the film was shot in "a Palestinian village that was ethnically cleansed by Zionist militias in 1948." Nadia Awad, a Palestinian-American filmmaker, referred to this as "desecration porn". Brett Remkus Britt argued that this movie is pinkwashing the Israeli occupation of Palestinian land. Evangelos Tziallas stated that Lucas, through this film, attempted to reinforce the symbolic distinction between East and West.
