= Michael Lucas (director) =

American producer, actor and pornographic film director

- Майкл Лукас
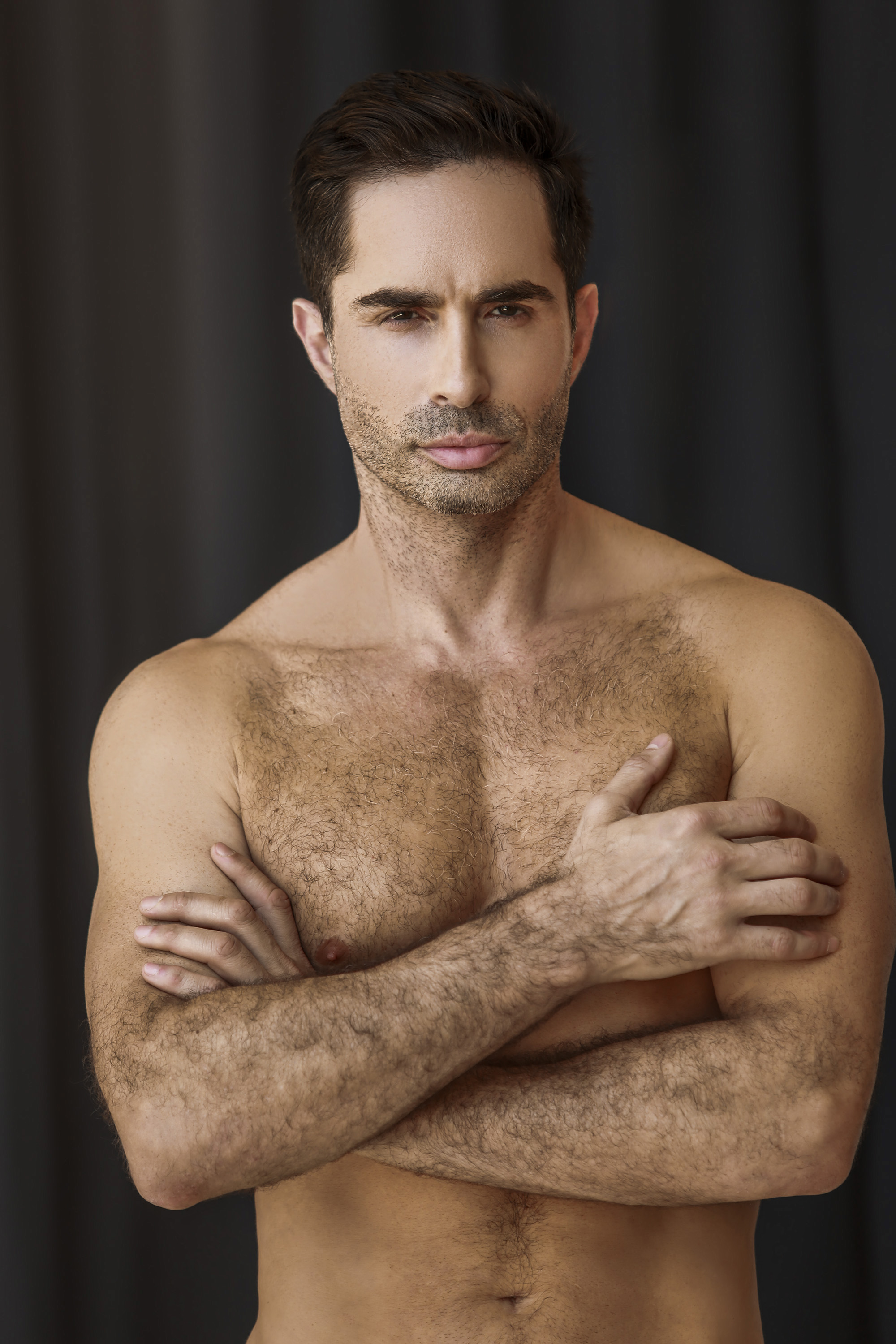
- Born: Andrei Treivas Bregman; March 10, 1972 (age 54); Moscow, Russian SFSR, Soviet Union
- Other names: Ramzes Kairoff; Michel Lucas; Michael Lucas
- Citizenship: Soviet Union (1972 - 1992) Russia (1992–2004) United States (since 2004) Israel (since 2009)
- Spouse: Richard Winger (m. 2008; div. 2014)
- Website: michaellucas.com

Michael Lucas (born Andrei Lvovich Treivas, Russian: Андрей Львович Трейвас on March 10, 1972) is a Russian-born American and Israeli businessman, pornographic film actor and director. He is the founder and CEO of Lucas Entertainment, which New York magazine in 2006 called New York's largest gay adult film company.

In 2008 The New Republic profiled Lucas as "Gay Porn's Neocon Kingpin". His 2005 film Michael Lucas' Dangerous Liaisons had a budget of $250,000, and Lucas has called it the most expensive gay porn film ever made. His 2006 film Michael Lucas' La Dolce Vita won a record 14 GayVN Awards. In 2009, Lucas was inducted into the GayVN Hall of Fame, noted for "his stature as an A-list director and performer".

In 2009, Lucas released what he called his most important film, Men of Israel, filmed in Israel. It was billed as the first gay porn film with an all-Israeli cast; Tablet and the Los Angeles Times called it a landmark as the first with an all-Jewish cast.

Lucas is also known for his political columns and activism, in particular his support for Israel and his criticism of Islam. In 2010 the LGBTQ website Queerty accused him of "a regular display of Islamophobia". In December 2023, during the Gaza war, he posted a photo of an Israeli shell signed "From Michael Lucas to Gaza". A number of performers then announced a boycott of his studio, which Lucas said was antisemitic in nature.

== Background ==
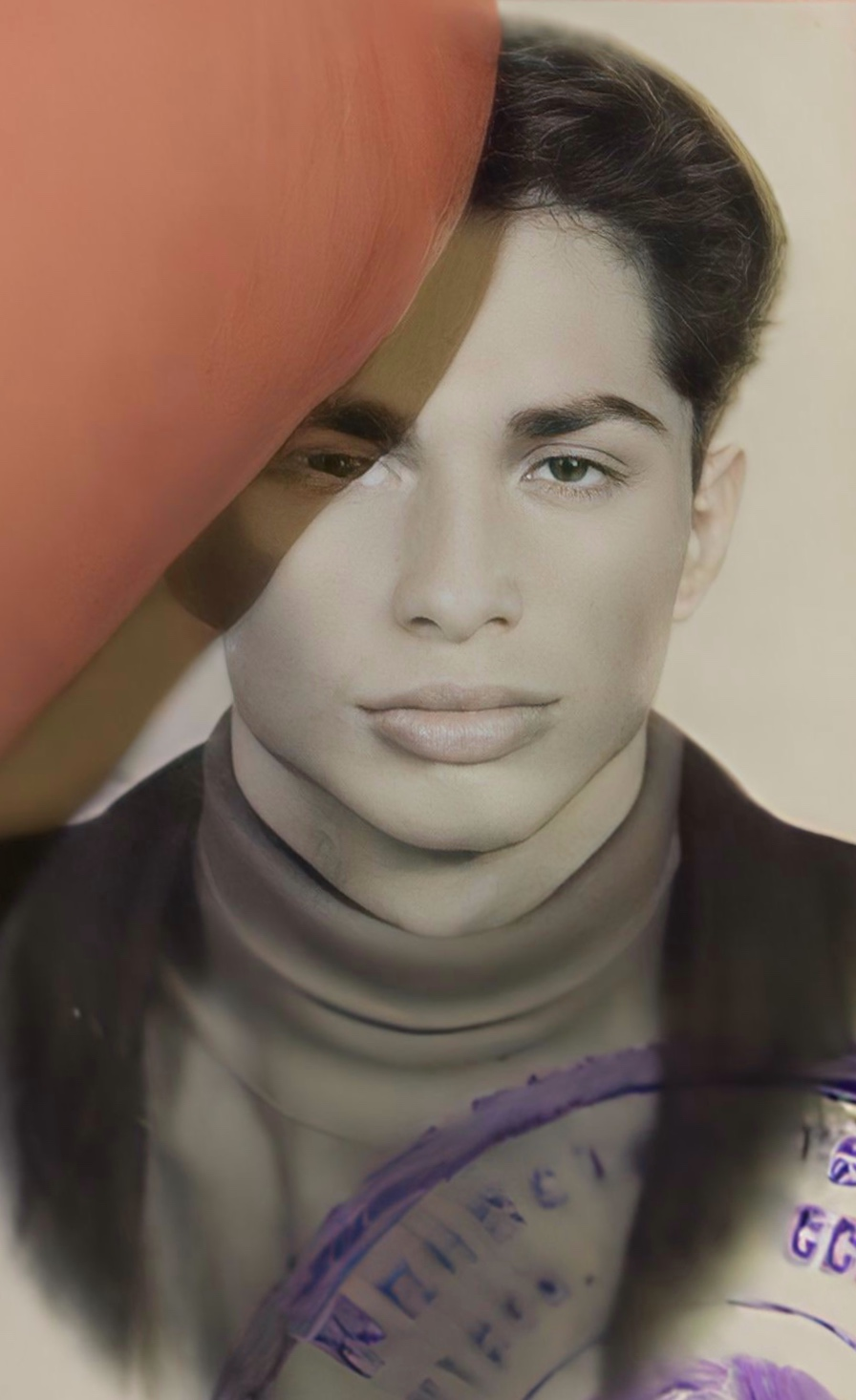
Lucas's passport picture, c. 1992

Lucas was born in Moscow, Russia, in 1972 to Lev Bregman, an engineer, and Elena Treivas, a Russian literature teacher. He was raised in a secular Jewish family. He was given his mother's surname, Treivas, and not his father's, Bregman; his official biography says this was to limit the antisemitism he would face. In 1994 he obtained a degree in law from the Moscow State Law Academy (now Kutafin Moscow State Law University). After graduation, Lucas briefly owned and operated a small travel agency in Russia until 1995.

In 1995, Lucas left for Munich, Germany, on a tourist visa. Without an official work permit, he appeared in heterosexual porn. He then worked as a nude model and in gay porn for French adult film producer Jean-Daniel Cadinot in Paris.

Lucas moved to New York City in 1997. He worked at the Gaiety Theater. After a few adult industry jobs in California, he was offered a one-year contract by Falcon, at the time America's biggest gay porn studio, whose producers had seen him in a French film. Lucas won a U.S. green card through the lottery system. In 1998, with money saved from his work at Falcon, he left Falcon and founded his own gay porn company, Lucas Entertainment, in New York, rather than Los Angeles where most American porn companies are headquartered.

By 2001 Lucas had helped his parents, brother and grandparents move to the United States; his parents and brother later went back to Moscow. On November 12, 2004, Lucas was sworn in as an American citizen.

Lucas's partner for many years was Richard Winger, an investor and a former president of New York's Lesbian & Gay Center. Winger put money into Lucas Entertainment. In October 2008 it was announced that Lucas had married Winger, his boyfriend of eight years. A press release stated that the couple wanted to marry to make a statement about same-sex marriage rights. In 2014 Vice reported that they had started divorce proceedings.

== Career ==
=== Actor ===
Lucas began his career in a German heterosexual pornographic film. In France, he worked under the influential director Jean-Daniel Cadinot. He appeared as "Ramzes Kairoff" in two gay pornographic films, both released in 1996. Using the name "Michel Lucas," he worked as a Falcon Exclusive, performing as a top in five films released in 1997 and 1998. Since 1998 he has performed in the films of his own studio, Lucas Entertainment; New York called him its biggest star.

=== Director ===
He directed his first project, Back in the Saddle, in 1998, and also performed in the film. Dangerous Liaisons won Best Film at the 2006 GayVN Awards. With co-director Tony DiMarco, Lucas won Best Director at the 2007 GayVN Awards for Michael Lucas' La Dolce Vita. DiMarco and Lucas also won a 2008 XBIZ Award for Best GLBT Director, and Lucas received an award for Best Publicity Stunt for "Michael Lucas Found Dead".

The Banana Guide called his productions the most polished, big-budget gay porn films ever made and cited Lucas' love for the subject and high technical aptitude.

Since the founding of Lucas Entertainment, Lucas has gone on to direct over 400 adult films for his studio. As of 2024 he had directed and produced hundreds of films, according to Tablet.

== Lucas Entertainment ==
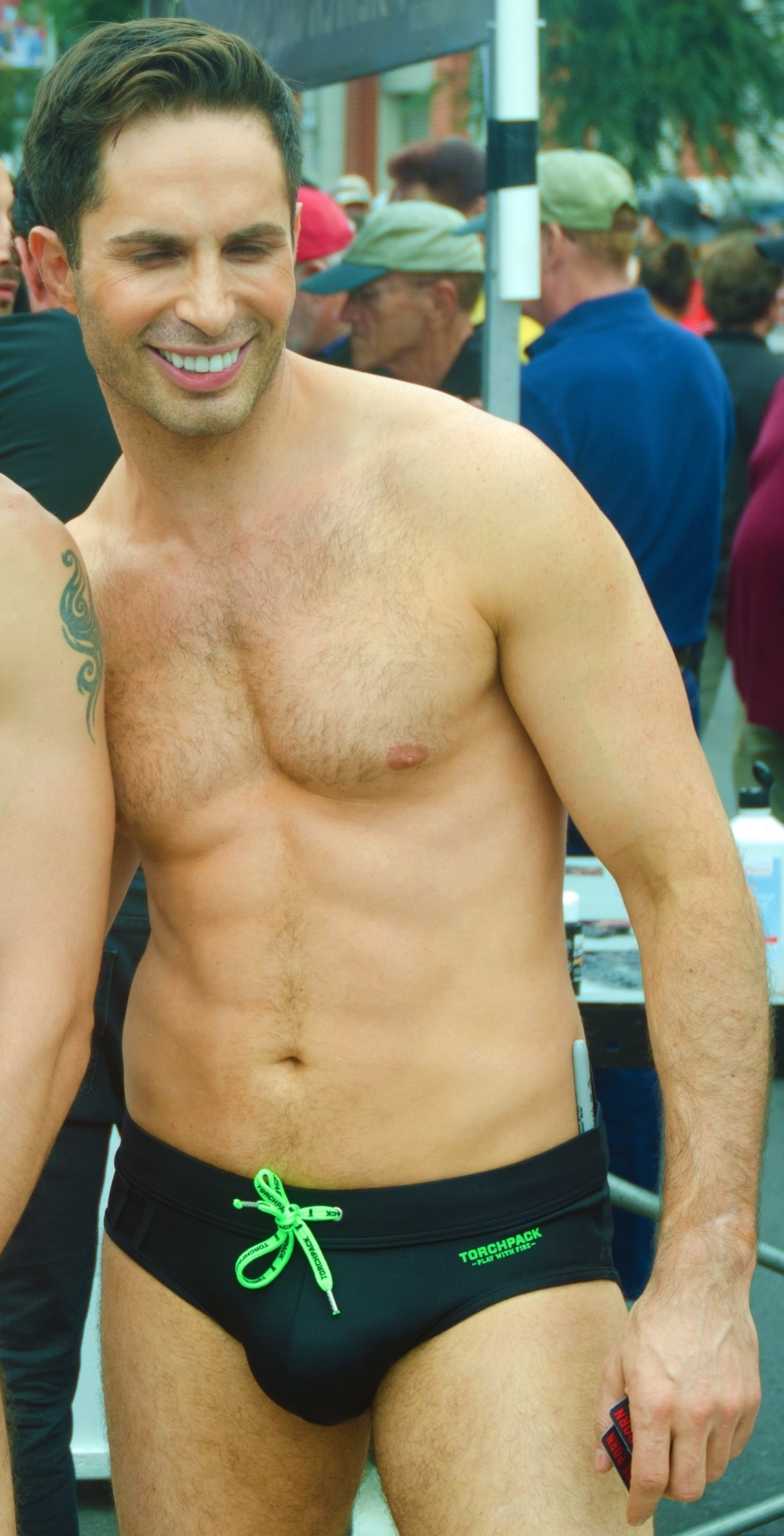
Lucas in bikini at Folsom Street Fair, 2014

In 1998, Lucas founded his own production company, Lucas Entertainment. He based the company in New York City. In 2004, Lucas Distribution, Inc., his adult video distribution company, began operations. Lucas directs, produces and stars in his own films under the Lucas Entertainment banner. His studio has won many GayVN Awards. It has also had Adult Erotic Gay Video Awards ("Grabbys") nominations and wins.

In 2005 the studio released Michael Lucas' Dangerous Liaisons, which moves the story from 18th-century France to Chelsea. Lucas has repeatedly called it the most expensive gay porn movie ever made, with a budget of $250,000. The film featured celebrity cameos from RuPaul, Boy George, Graham Norton, Bruce Vilanch, Lady Bunny, Amanda Lepore, and Michael Musto.

The company received 24 nominations for the 2009 GayVN Awards, including best picture for Return to Fire Island.

In 2009 the studio made Men of Israel, shot in Tel Aviv, Haifa and desert locations. It was promoted as the first gay porn film with an all-Israeli cast, and Lucas said he wanted it to promote Israeli culture and tourism. Tablet wrote that the larger story was that it was the first gay porn film with an all-Jewish cast. The company launched its Men of Israel website to promote the film, which announced its release for July 22.

Lucas was included in a 2009 New York magazine feature about people who made it to the top, despite arriving in the city with very little.

=== Michael Lucas' La Dolce Vita ===
In 2006, the studio made Michael Lucas' La Dolce Vita Parts 1 & 2, a gay pornographic remake of the 1960 Fellini classic La Dolce Vita. The film won a record fourteen awards at the 2007 GayVN Awards, winning in every category in which it was nominated. The Advocate reported that it cost an estimated $250,000 and was one of the most expensive gay adult films ever produced.

In February 2007, International Media Films, Inc. (IMF), which said it had bought La Dolce Vita in 2001, filed suit against Lucas (as Andrei Treivas Bregman) for trademark and copyright infringement. The lawsuit sought to stop sales of the two films and to collect unspecified damages.

Lucas won the lawsuit in 2010. Judge John G. Koeltl of the federal court in Manhattan granted him summary judgment on both the copyright and the trademark claims. The judge found that IMF had not shown that it owned the Fellini film, and that the film could be in the public domain. The claims of copyright infringement were dismissed since many porn films have parodied mainstream films.

== Documentary filmmaker ==
Lucas has also made documentaries. His first, Undressing Israel: Gay Men in the Promised Land, is about gay life in Israel. The film includes footage of Tel Aviv's vibrant nightlife, a same-sex wedding, and candid interviews with a diverse range of local Israeli gays and lesbians, including a gay MP, an openly gay Army trainer, a drag queen, a transvestite, a young Arab-Israeli journalist, and same-sex parents raising their children and a number of artists and activists. In 2014, Lucas released his second documentary, Campaign of Hate: Russia and Gay Propaganda, made with co-director Scott Stern. It is about the anti-gay climate in Russian politics and society.

== Writer, speaker and activist ==
I couldn't talk about anything in Russia. I was growing up in a very strict regime. But I rebelled.

— Michael Lucas

In the 2000s, Lucas attracted attention for his views on politics and culture through his columns, speaking events and activism. He is a vocal opponent of drug use and an advocate for safe sex, both in the porn industry and the gay community at large. In August 2004, The Advocate published an interview by Harvey Fierstein with Lucas about his full-page public service announcements in several national publications warning of the dangers of unprotected sex.

Increasingly Lucas gained attention for his politics, and in particular his views on Israel and Muslims. In March 2008 he was profiled in The New Republic as "Gay porn's neocon kingpin". The article explored his background and a controversy over his writings on Islam that surrounded a lecture he gave at Stanford University.

In an interview with Michael Musto in April 2009, Lucas remarked that his stifled upbringing in Soviet Russia influenced how vocal he is about his opinions.

Lucas wrote about the need for LGBT people to reassess conservatives in August 2010, citing Ann Coulter as an example of a gay-friendly conservative leader.

=== Columnist ===
From 2007 Lucas wrote a regular opinion column for The New York Blade, a gay newspaper. On April 20, 2007, The New York Blade began to publish regular opinion columns by Lucas, who had previously had a number of comments published in the Blade's opinion section. In October 2009, Lucas wrote a column for The Advocate decrying the group Queers Undermining Israeli Terrorism. In March 2010 Lucas began writing a column for The Advocate. His columns have focused on Israel, Russia's confronting homosexuality, and the Park51 controversy. In 2011 he started writing a column for Huffington Post. As of 2024, Lucas has also contributed opinion writing to The Jerusalem Post. He has also written opinion pieces for Out.

==== Islam ====
His writings on Islam have been controversial. In a 2007 New York Blade column, Lucas expressed support for artist Charles Merrill's burning of a Koran that was estimated at $60,000. He has condemned Islam and accused it of creating negative attitudes that lead to the persecution of homosexuals and discrimination of women. He has also called the Koran "today's Mein Kampf".

As a columnist for The Advocate, Lucas continued to explore Islamic topics. In a heavily debated column, he called the Cordoba House, a proposed Islamic community center and mosque controversially located near the World Trade Center site, a 'monument to Muslim terrorism' and an example of "political Islam's ascendancy." Queerty called the column part of "a regular display of Islamophobia" and asked why The Advocate kept publishing him. After the 2011 Egyptian revolution he wrote that the Muslim Brotherhood would fill a power vacuum, asserting that it would be a problem for the discreet Egyptian gay community that has lived with relatively little government persecution.

=== University lectures ===
In April 2005, Lucas was invited to speak before a Calhoun College Master's Tea at Yale University. The speech was organized with the assistance of gaYalies, a campus group for gay and bisexual men. He spoke about his life history and his views on pornography. In February 2006 he participated in a symposium on adult entertainment that was sponsored by the Yale Journal of Law and Feminism, which later published Lucas' discussion in its Spring issue.

The Speakers Bureau at Stanford University invited Lucas to speak in Cubberley Auditorium on February 14, 2008, about the role the adult entertainment industry plays in AIDS prevention. The appearance sparked debate about his political columns for the New York Blade, particularly his assertions that "the Qur'an is today's Mein Kampf" and that its teachings inspire Muslims to kill gay people.

Lucas, who grew up in the Soviet Union and experienced its antisemitism and homophobia, was on a panel at The New School on the state of gay rights and acceptability in Eastern Europe.

In June 2010, he spoke at the Oxford Union in a debate on the motion "This House believes that gay rights have undermined family values". Lucas spoke for the motion; Peter Tatchell and Sue Sanders were among the speakers against it.

=== PrEP ===
In 2013 Lucas wrote an op-ed column at Out.com where he discussed his use of Truvada (which he began using in June of that year). Lucas, who is HIV-negative, is a major advocate of pre-exposure prophylaxis (PrEP), the use of the drug Truvada to prevent HIV infection. In April 2014 Michael Weinstein, president of the AIDS Healthcare Foundation, called Truvada a "party drug". Lucas then called on him to resign.

Lucas was at first a strong advocate of condoms on camera, but in 2014 his studio began to make films without them. He said that his position had changed because of PrEP and HIV treatment, and that he encourages his models to use PrEP. In September 2015 he released a public service announcement in which he urges viewers to ask their doctor about PrEP. The same month he wrote in Out.com that PrEP works and that the backlash against its use needs to stop. On February 24, 2016, PrEP was formally approved in Israel.

=== Israel ===
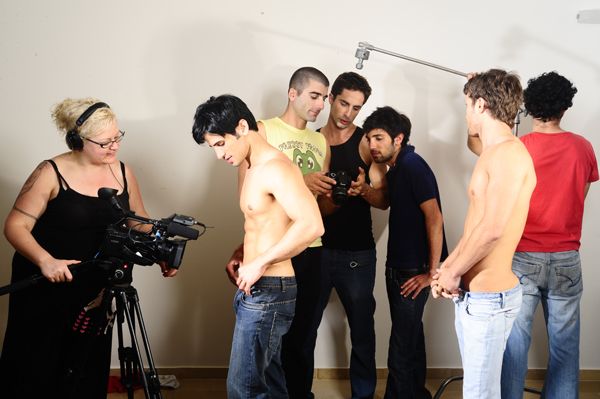
Lucas, under the microphone, on the set of the 2009 release Men of Israel, the first gay adult film with an all-Jewish cast, i.e. none of the actors were Palestinian citizens of Israel.

The New Republic wrote that Lucas's Jewish heritage is the anchor of his worldview, and that he visits Israel every year. New York wrote that like many Soviet Jews he is not very religious, but is proud of his heritage. His time growing up in the Soviet Union, which was notorious for its antisemitism, meant that like many Russian Jews, Lucas had to repress his identity.

In summer 2006, around the time of the Lebanon war, Lucas went to Israel to entertain gay soldiers (who are allowed to serve openly in the military). He gave a live sex show at a Tel Aviv nightclub, and soldiers got in for free. Lucas received a positive response to the trip; however, some religious segments of Israeli society had expressed less enthusiasm for the arrival of a gay porn magnate. In an article, "Lucas responds," Lucas characterized some of the reaction as homophobic and in an interview said, "Israel is my country as much as it is yours. To come to Israel is my birthright."

In September 2009, Lucas was granted Israeli citizenship. In 2010, he renounced his Russian citizenship. He followed Men of Israel with a gay tour of Israel.

Lucas has also been a harsh critic of ultra-Orthodox Israelis. The next summer in a New York Blade column Lucas brought up his disapproval of Haredi Judaism in Israel once again. In "Trouble With Ultra-Orthodox," Lucas referred to the Ultra-Orthodox community in Jerusalem as "religious goons" and parasites for his belief that they take advantage of state welfare programs.

=== New York LGBT Community Center ===
In February 2011, Lucas created a controversy over a pro-Palestinian group that planned to hold a meeting at New York's Lesbian, Gay, Bisexual & Transgender Community Center. The group, Siegebusters, had planned to hold a fundraising party on March 5 at the center to help fund another vessel to break the Israeli naval blockade of Gaza, as well as to train activists. Lucas protested and claimed that Israel is the only gay-friendly country in the Middle East, that the group was anti-Semitic, and that LGBT people in the Palestinian territories are tortured and killed. After Lucas's calls for a boycott, the Center backed down and decided that Siegebusters was not an LGBT-related group, and so they should not use their space for the Israeli Apartheid Week event. Siegebusters protested the decision by organizing an online petition; Lucas told The Jerusalem Post that his success with the event's cancellation was a "landmark moment" in his life.

The controversy arose again in May 2011 after the center agreed to let the group Queers Against Israeli Apartheid meet in their building, triggering Lucas to again call for a boycott and an end to the center's funding. In a statement defending the move, the center said that it "provides space for a variety of LGBT voices in our community to engage in conversations on a range of topics." In a press release, Lucas responded that the center had become an accomplice of an "anti-Semitic hate group whose goal is the destruction of the Jewish state of Israel". In the beginning of June 2011, the center decided to place a "moratorium" on renting space to "groups that organize around the Israeli-Palestinian conflict."

== Controversy ==
=== Endorsement of rocket used to bomb Gaza ===
Lucas' reply on X picturing an Israeli bomb signed "From Michael Lucas to Gaza"

On December 16, 2023, former UFC / MMA fighter Jake Shields posted on X that Israeli soldiers were writing his name, and those of other critics of Israel's military actions in Gaza, on missiles. (Shields later launched a podcast, Fight Back with Jake Shields, which the Southern Poverty Law Center reported has promoted Holocaust denial, antisemitic conspiracy theories, racism, and male supremacist views while featuring white nationalist guests such as David Duke and Germar Rudolf.) The next day Lucas, who was in Israel at the time, replied with a photo of an Israeli shell signed "From Michael Lucas to Gaza" and wrote:

Hahaha I actually asked to write my name. Got a pic before and after. Did you get them too? Amazing difference!

Lucas later said that an IDF soldier had written his name on the shell and sent him the picture, to thank him for bringing donations to the army. In a Jerusalem Post op-ed he said that a female friend of his, an IDF soldier, had written his name on the bomb.

A number of adult performers then said they would no longer work with Lucas and his company. Lucas told the Israeli news site Ynet that he believed the boycott was due to antisemitism, rather than, as many critics stated, that the missile was likely to kill Palestinian civilians: "I'm the only Jewish owner of an adult company in the gay side of the industry. So is it a coincidence that I'm being boycotted?"

In an article for the American Jewish magazine Tablet, Ross Anderson questions if pro-Palestine adult film performers are using the Israel–Hamas conflict as a means of gaining popularity and earning new followers. Meanwhile, Anderson points out that Lucas is the only Jewish owner of a traditional gay adult studio, has directed and produced hundreds of films, and is an industry veteran with a place in the GayVN Hall of Fame. Anderson goes on to note that Lucas operates his company, Lucas Entertainment, in the "pre-influencer model of the porn economy," writing the following: "[Lucas makes] films that require actors and a crew to produce. His comments have made his name better known—unintentionally, of course—but only insofar as he is becoming a notorious pariah in the porn industry for his stance on Israel."

On December 24, 2023, porn star Sean Xavier, who had previously worked with Lucas Entertainment, wrote on X:

I find [the post] both saddening and reprehensible. For those that are inquiring, I will no longer be promoting my work with that studio, nor accepting future offers to work with them.

=== Removing pro-LGBTQ-Palestinian flag ===
In June 2024, the gay activist group ACT-UP removed a flag honoring House Representative Ritchie Torres, who is the first openly gay member of Congress with black and Latino heritage, from an area recognizing the contributions of LGBTQ history makers in Fire Island Pines' Trailblazer Park. ACT-UP replaced it with two flags of its own, one of which was in recognition of queer Palestinians.

Lucas removed the pro-Palestinian flag in response. As in the reaction to the missile-related boycott, he stated his belief that the motivation was "classic, textbook antisemitism". Lucas went on to question why, according to him, ACT-UP is "quiet" on incidents of abuse of and danger to gay people in Arab countries, but "rant about a war started by Hamas they know nothing about, simply because it involves Jews." Lucas recorded himself carrying a ladder to Trailblazer Park, removing the flag (which included the ACT-UP slogan Silence=Death), and tossing it into a trash bin. The written caption Lucas included with the video stated “we don’t need Hamas propaganda dividing us. Otherwise, this open and diverse community will be [unwelcoming] to Jews."

== In popular culture ==
Lucas appeared in Timothy Greenfield-Sanders' 2004 book XXX: 30 Porn Star Photographs and the accompanying HBO documentary Thinking XXX. Greenfield-Sanders asked Lucas for a list of his ten favorite films; the ten films he listed are all films from his own production company. In May 2007, Kensington Books published Naked: The Life and Pornography of Michael Lucas, a biography of Lucas by Corey Taylor. Lucas asserts the book was published without his involvement or approval.

== Awards ==
- 2000: Adult Erotic Gay Video Awards ("Grabbys") – Best Newcomer – Director
- 2001: GayVN Awards – Best Solo Performance: Fire Island Cruising
- 2006: GayVN Awards – Best Film: Michael Lucas' Dangerous Liaisons
- 2007: GayVN Awards – Best Actor: Michael Lucas' La Dolce Vita
- 2007: GayVN Awards – Best Threesome: Michael Lucas' La Dolce Vita
- 2007: GayVN Awards – Best Director: Michael Lucas' La Dolce Vita (Tony DiMarco, co-director)
- 2008: XBIZ Award – GLBT Director of the Year (with Tony DiMarco)
- 2008: XBIZ Award – Publicity Stunt of the Year: Michael Lucas Found Dead
- 2009: GayVN Awards – GayVN Hall of Fame

== Filmography ==
=== Adult films ===
A complete list of film performance and model credits can be found at Lucas Entertainment.com, including those directed, written or produced by Lucas.

=== Documentaries ===
- 2012: Undressing Israel: Gay Men in the Promised Land (written, produced, directed) – co-directed by Yariv Mozer
- 2014: Campaign of Hate: Russia and Gay Propaganda – co-directed and produced with Scott Stern

== Gallery ==
Lucas in October 2007

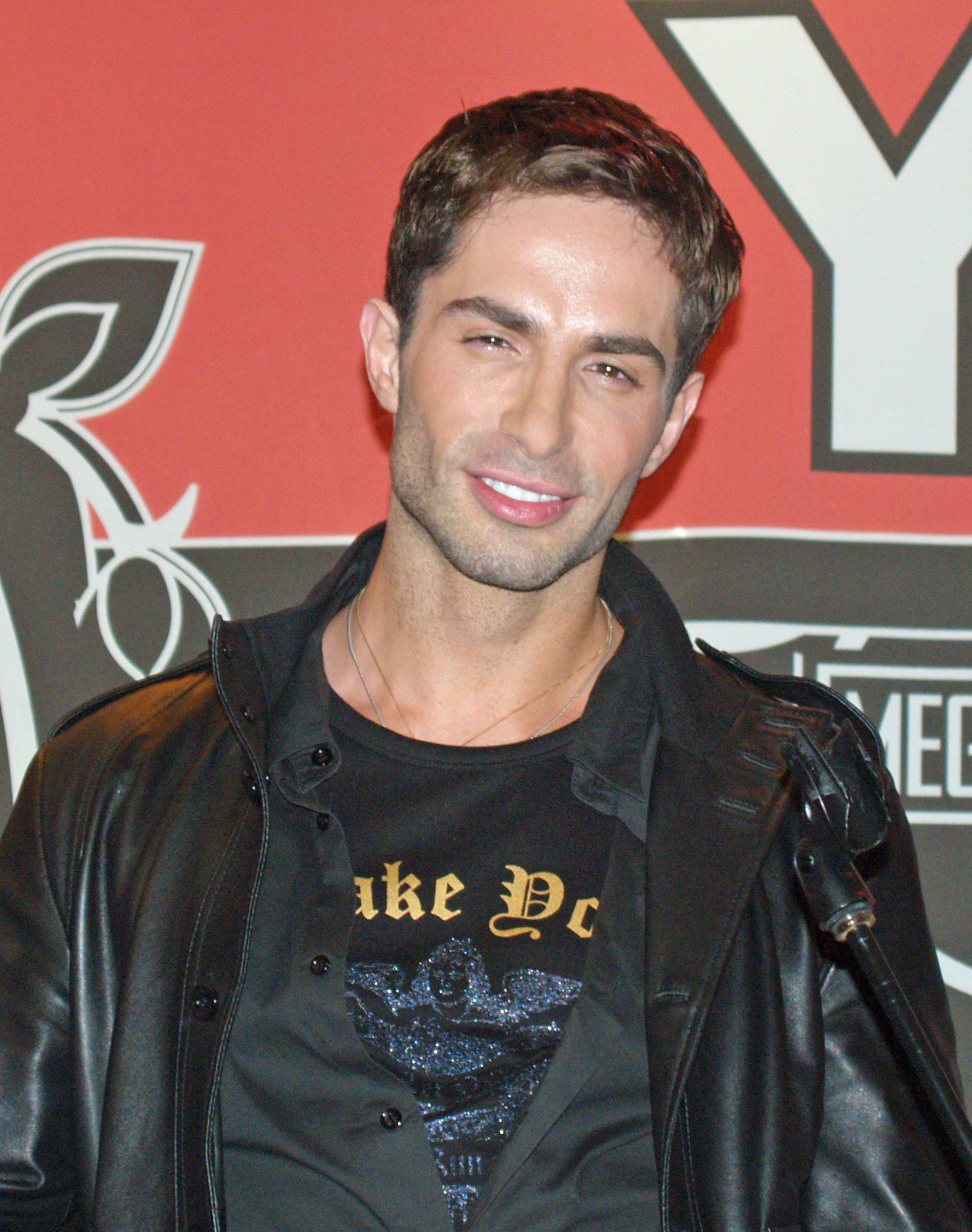
Lucas in October 2007

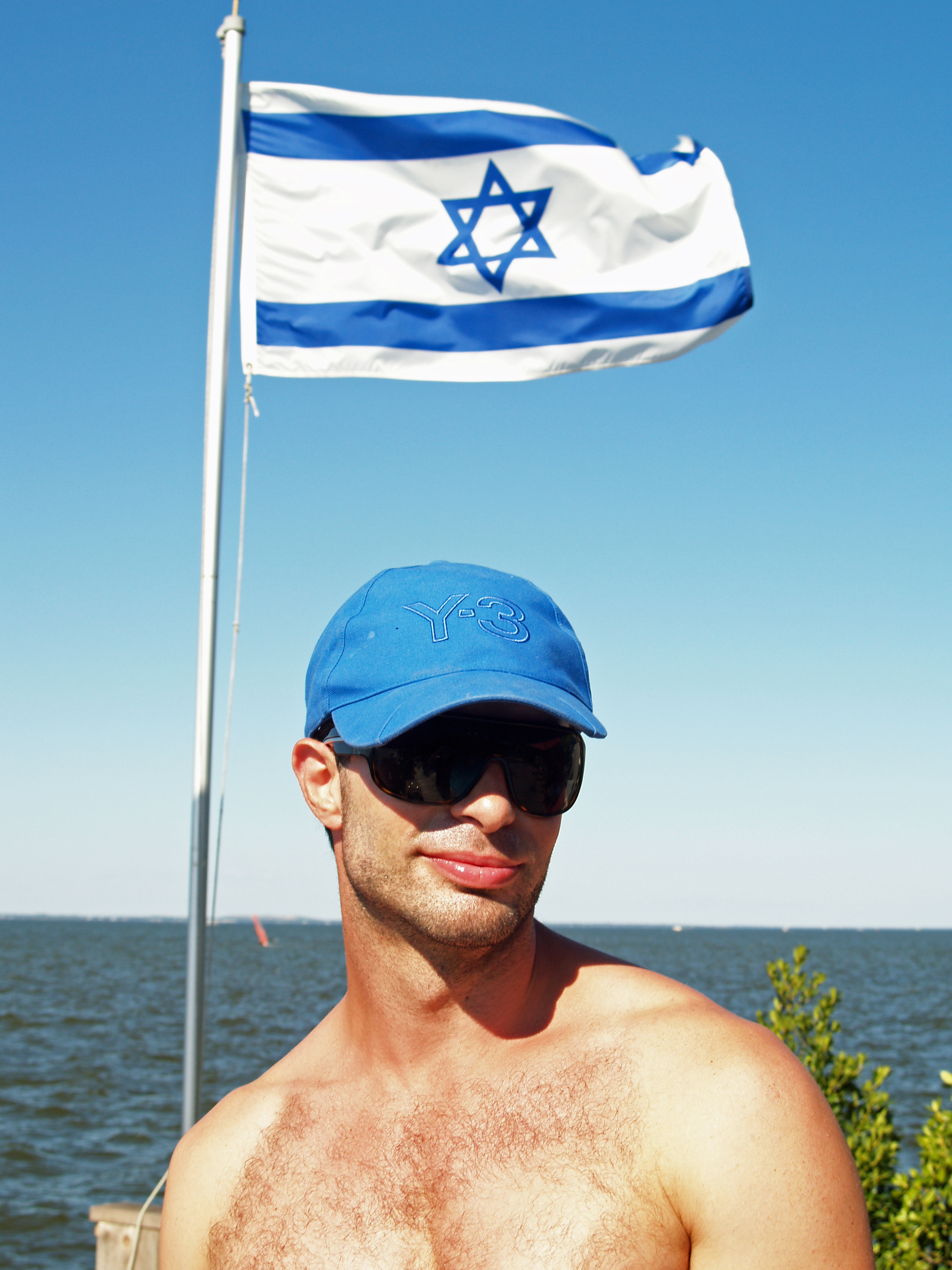
At home in Fire Island Pines with an Israeli flag, August 2008

Looking for oysters in the Great South Bay

With journalist Jason Bellini

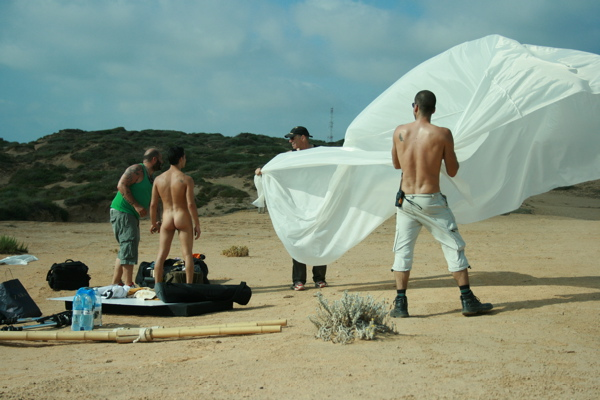
On the set of Men of Israel, May 2009

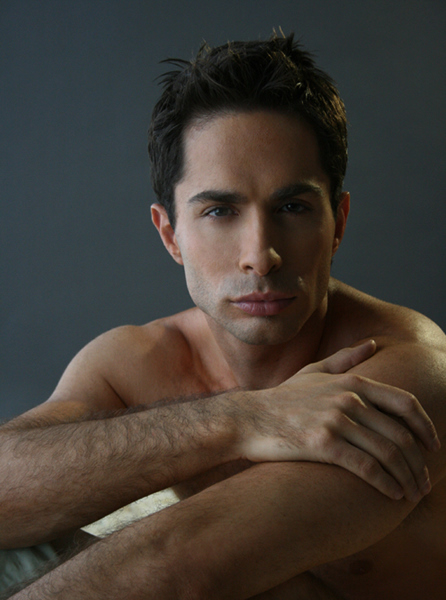
Lucas in 2009

With Michael Musto and Rob Roth at the Hookies awards, March 2010

At the Hookies awards, March 2010

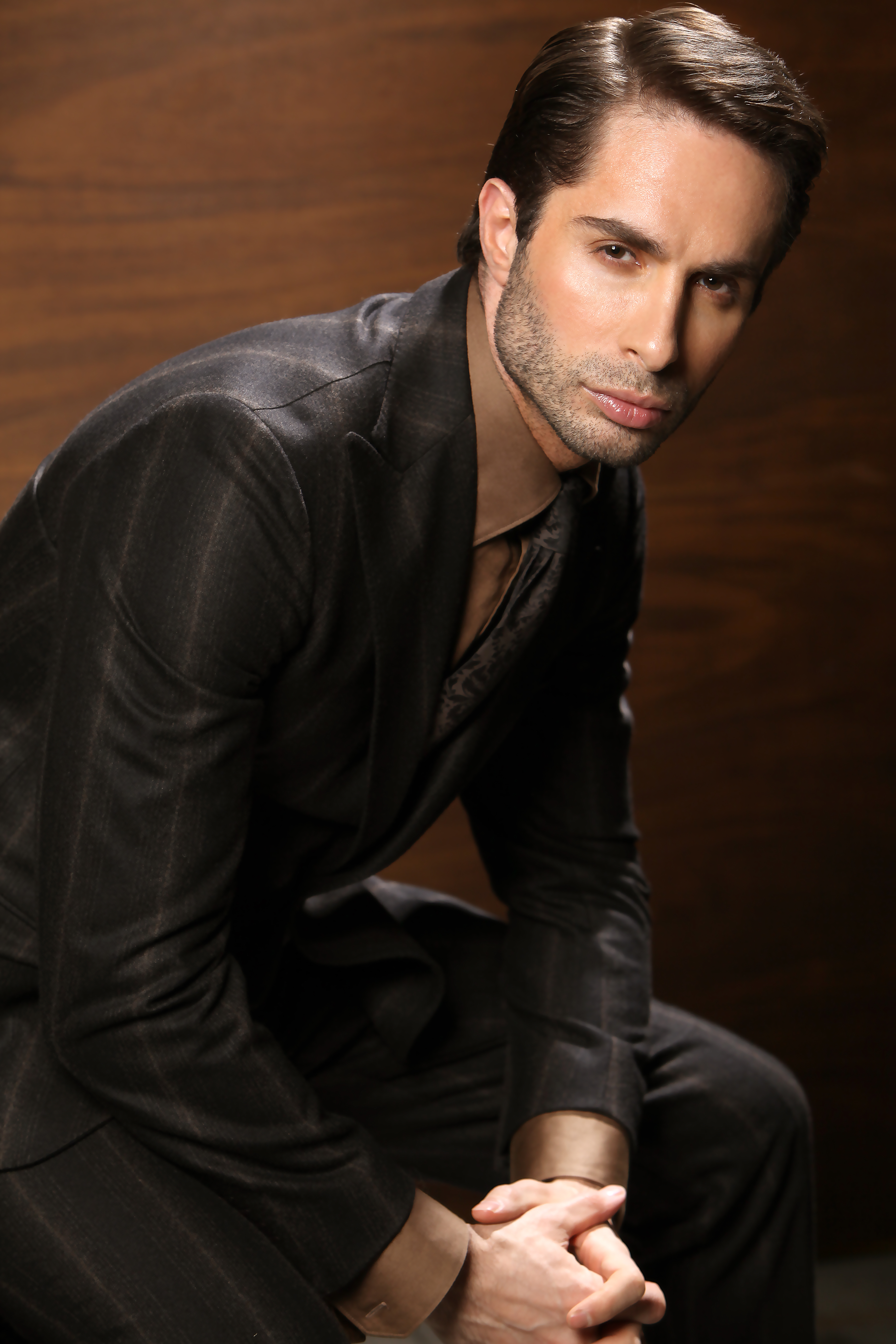
Lucas in 2011

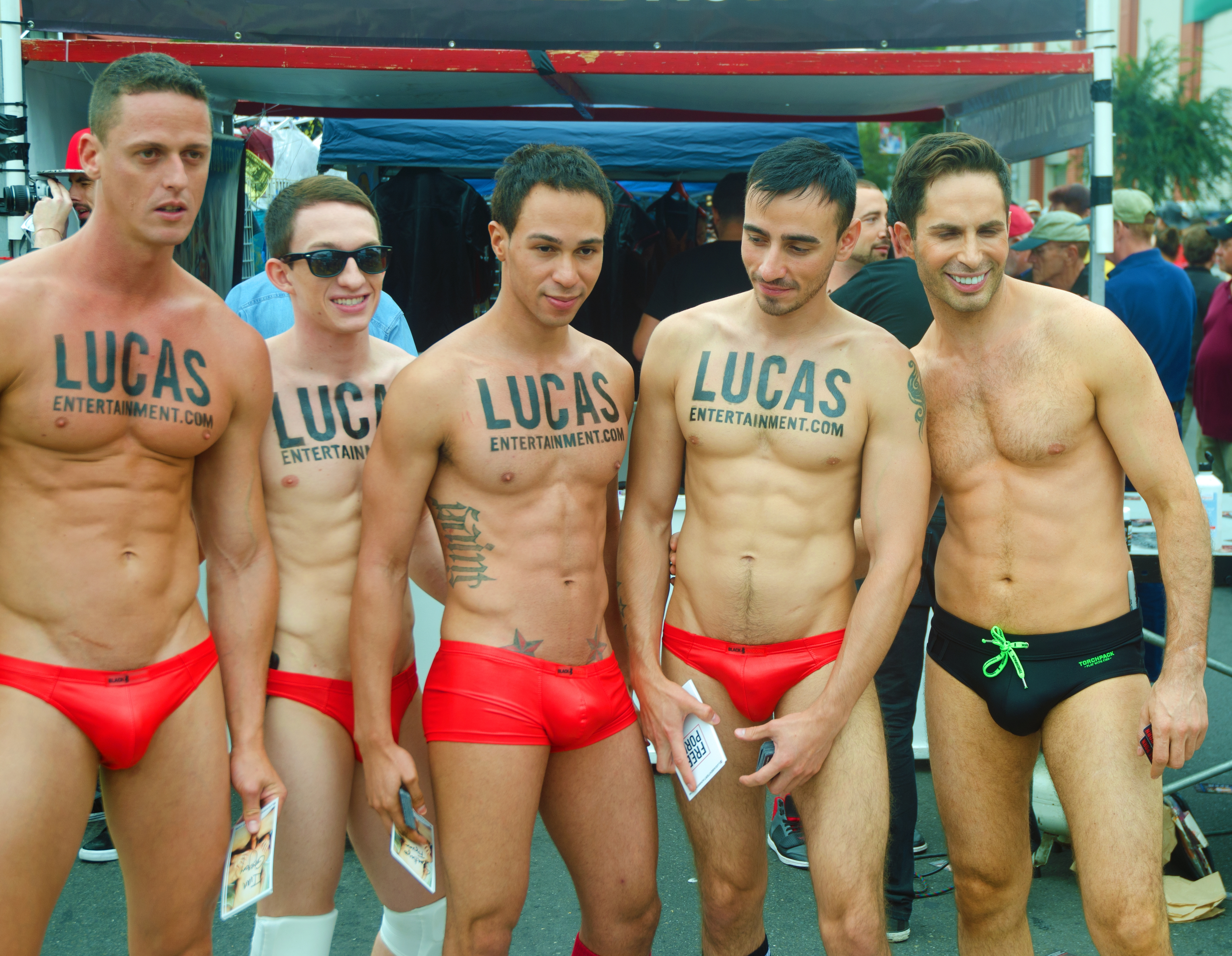
Lucas Entertainment at Folsom Street Fair, 2014

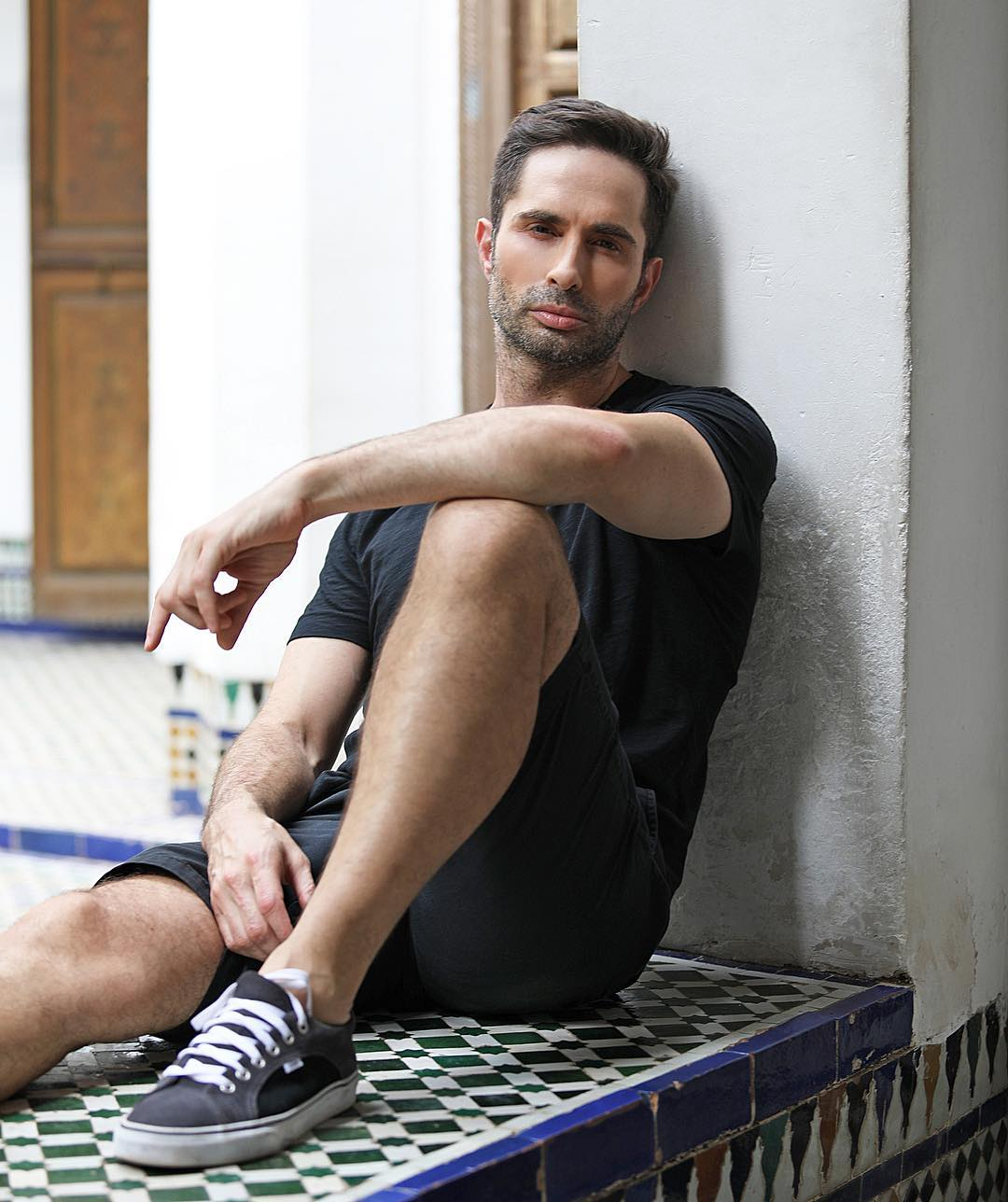
Lucas in 2019

== See also ==
- Adult Erotic Gay Video Awards
- GayVN Awards
- LGBT culture in New York City
- List of male performers in gay porn films
- List of pornographic movie studios
- List of LGBT people from New York City
- New Yorkers in journalism
- NYC Pride March
