= Campaign of Hate: Russia and Gay Propaganda =

- Film poster
- Directed by: Scott Stern; Michael Lucas
- Written by: Scott Stern
- Produced by: Scott Stern; Michael Lucas
- Edited by: Olga Lvoff
- Music by: Daniel Halle
- Production companies: Breaking Glass Pictures; Lucas Documentaries
- Release date: April 1, 2014
- Running time: 79 minutes
- Country: United States
- Languages: English; Russian

Campaign of Hate: Russia and Gay Propaganda is a 2014 American documentary about LGBT rights in Russia directed by Scott Stern and Michael Lucas.

== Synopsis ==
Michael Lucas interviews various LGBT advocates in Moscow, Russia. Topics include homophobia in Russian society, gay bashing, the Russian LGBT propaganda law, and Vladimir Putin's administration.

== Interviewees ==
- Masha Gessen, an activist who left Russia following talk of a Russian law that would take children away from LGBT couples
- Thor Halvorssen Mendoza, founder of Human Rights Foundation
- Wanja Kilber, activist
- Anton Krasovsky, a journalist who came out as gay on national television
- Alexander Kargaltsev, photographer and filmmaker
- Manny de Guerre and Gulya Sultanova, organizers of Side by Side
- Elena Kostyuchenko, journalist and activist
- Mitya Aleshkovsky, photographer
- Marina Melnik, activist
- Andrey Obolensky, activist
- Dmitry Potapov, an immigrant seeking asylum in the US
- Vitaly Milonov, a legislator responsible for the LGBT propaganda law

== Production ==
Lucas invested $100,000 of his own money in the documentary. Shooting took place in Russia over the course of a month. A Kickstarter campaign was launched in December 2013 to complete post-production. Lucas, who had previously renounced his Russian citizenship and emigrated to the US, said that he neither enjoyed being back in Russia nor filming the documentary; however, he felt that someone had to do so. During his interview with Milonov, Lucas said that he attempted to remain as calm as possible in order to allow Milonov's remarks to speak for themselves. Although it was not included in the theatrical release, Lucas said he engaged in a debate with Milonov late in the interview, during which Milonov became angry and left. Lucas cited weak opposition in the West to Russia's policies as one of the reasons why he shot the documentary. He said that he hoped to keep the issue in the news by highlighting it.

== Release ==
Campaign of Hate was released on DVD on April 1, 2014, and video on demand in May 2014.

== Reception ==
Out wrote, "This film isn't Lucas walking away from Russia, but a clear-eyed, unsentimental look at a country that demonize LGBTs in a concerted, violent, and dangerous way for political gain." David Lewis of the San Francisco Chronicle wrote, "The film, which puts the campaign of hate into political context, includes LGBT folks from all walks of Russian life, and we can't help but marvel at their courage in a time of such peril." WBOC-TV rated it 3/5 stars and wrote, "It's good as a series of testimonies, but, as a complete documentary, it's rather lacking."
