= Stateside (film) =

- Theatrical poster
- Directed by: Reverge Anselmo
- Written by: Reverge Anselmo
- Produced by: Robert Greenhut
- Starring: Rachael Leigh Cook; Jonathan Tucker; Agnes Bruckner; Val Kilmer; Joe Mantegna; Carrie Fisher; Diane Venora; Ed Begley Jr. Daniel Franzese; Paul Le Mat; Penny Marshall
- Narrated by: Jonathan Tucker
- Cinematography: Adam Holender
- Edited by: Suzy Elmiger
- Music by: Joel McNeely
- Distributed by: Samuel Goldwyn Films
- Release date: May 21, 2004
- Running time: 96 minutes
- Country: United States
- Language: English
- Box office: $174,318

Stateside (released as Sinners in Germany) is a 2004 American biographical-drama film. Based on a true story, the film depicts a wealthy high school student serving in the Marine Corps to avoid jail, who eventually falls in love with an actress with schizophrenia. Those around them ask them to keep their distance from each other, but both refuse.

The film was released to theaters on May 21, 2004 to generally negative reviews from critics.

== Plot ==
Dori Lawrence (Rachael Leigh Cook) is an actress and singer who resides in Hollywood, California. She has undiagnosed schizophrenia, which causes problems in her career. After another concert goes wrong due to her untreated disease, she is sent to get help for her schizophrenia.

Meanwhile, Mark Deloach (Jonathan Tucker) is a rich, high school kid miles away, attending a Catholic school. Although shy around girls and a good kid, he takes part in underage drinking. His brother, Gregory, who has secret sexual rendezvous with the prestigious Sue Dubois (Agnes Bruckner), has one of their dirty notes blamed on him. He and a buddy of his decide to pay him back by taking Sue back to her mother and reveal what's been going on with her and Gregory which they knew she will disapprove. In the process, a car crash occurs, resulting in the injury of both Sue and Father Concoff (Ed Begley Jr.), the principal of their high school.

Sue's mother, Mrs. Dubois (Carrie Fisher), decides to press charges against Mark. However, a deal is made to have Mark serve in the Marine Corps instead of jail time.

Mark departs to recruit training at the Marine Corps Recruit Depot in Parris Island and finds that Staff Sergeant Skeer (Val Kilmer) has taken an interest in him as Mark is using the Corps to escape jail time. Eventually, Mark satisfies the tough Senior Drill Instructor and officially becomes a Marine.

Once back home, he finds himself cutting ties with his friends and befriends Sue, who is now in a half way house, and Dori, who is her roommate. He also apologizes to Father Concoff, who accepts his apology, but the latter is still angry with what occurred. Mark and Dori set a date with each other to go to a dance, but she doesn't get to go. Mark leaves her a gift. Later, he and Dori go out on a date, and Mark loses his virginity to her.

Dori and Mark keep in contact through letters and phone calls, but eventually Dori's illness worsens, and she loses touch with reality. Friends and family beg Mark to help Dori get treatment, but he opposes any suggestion that might separate them. Eventually, an intervention support group keeps the two away from each other.

Mark is deployed to overseas action, and he is injured in the bombing of the Marine Barracks in Beirut in 1983. He returns home with an honorable discharge. Apart for two years, Dori contacts Mark in a hospital where he has been recuperating. They plan to marry and start a new life together.

== Cast ==
- Rachael Leigh Cook as Dori Lawrence
- Jonathan Tucker as Mark Deloach
- Agnes Brucker as Sue Dubois
- Val Kilmer as SDI Skeer
- Joe Mantegna as Mr. Deloach
- Carrie Fisher as Mrs. Dubois
- Diane Venora as Mrs. Hengen
- Ed Begley Jr. as Father Concoff
- Daniel Franzese as Danny Tripodi
- Paul Le Mat as Dori's Internist
- Penny Marshall as Lt. Chevetone

== Production ==
The film took eight weeks to shoot. To prepare for the role, Cook actually spent time with patients who had schizophrenia and read medical books from her father on this subject.

Anselmo, the writer/director, was a Marine, and the men who played Marines went through Marine boot camp to prepare for their roles.

Dori Lawrence's character is based on actress Sarah Holcomb, who appeared in two successful early 1980s comedies before leaving the film industry and struggling with mental health.

== Release ==
The film was released on May 21, 2004, making an opening of $113,620. It would go on to make $174,318 domestically.

== Reception ==
On the review aggregator website Rotten Tomatoes, 24% of 45 critics' reviews are positive, with an average rating of 4.3/10. The website's consensus reads: "An inept drama that rings false." Metacritic, which uses a weighted average, assigned the film a score of 35 out of 100, based on 19 critics, indicating "generally unfavorable" reviews. Roger Ebert gave the film 2 out of 4 stars, praising the actors' performances but criticizing the dialogue, which he described as sounding "more like experimental poetry or song lyrics than like speech." Ebert described the film as thematically incomplete, writing "[w]e sense there’s more Anselmo wants to say about the character than he has time for. “Stateside” plays like urgent ideas for a movie which Anselmo needed to make, but they’re still in note form."
