= An Englishman in New York (film) =

- Directed by: Richard Laxton
- Written by: Brian Fillis
- Produced by: Amanda Jenks
- Starring: John Hurt; Denis O'Hare; Jonathan Tucker; Swoosie Kurtz; Cynthia Nixon
- Music by: Paul Englishby
- Production company: Leopardrama
- Release date: 7 February 2009 (Berlinale)
- Running time: 75 minutes
- Country: United Kingdom
- Language: English

An Englishman in New York is a 2009 biographical film that chronicles the years gay English writer Quentin Crisp spent in New York City, starring John Hurt reprising his role as Crisp from The Naked Civil Servant (1975). The film takes its title from "Englishman in New York", a song about Crisp written by Sting for the 1987 album ...Nothing Like the Sun.

== Plot ==
The film follows Quentin Crisp's move in the late 1970s from London to New York City, where he was embraced by celebrities and artists. Crisp becomes a local, and then more national, celebrity and writes for New York magazines. He struggles with controversy over flippant comments he makes during the AIDS crisis which he refuses to recant. He befriends and helps to promote artist Patrick Angus. In the 1990s, he continues his hefty schedule of public performances, including a two-person show with performance artist Penny Arcade. He appears in the Sally Potter film Orlando as Queen Elizabeth I and appears for the last time in America in a Tampa, Florida gay bar doing a Q&A where he reminds the young crowd of outsiders: "Neither look forward where there is doubt, nor backward where there is regret, look inward and ask, not if there is anything outside that you want, but whether is anything inside that you have not yet unpacked."

== Cast ==
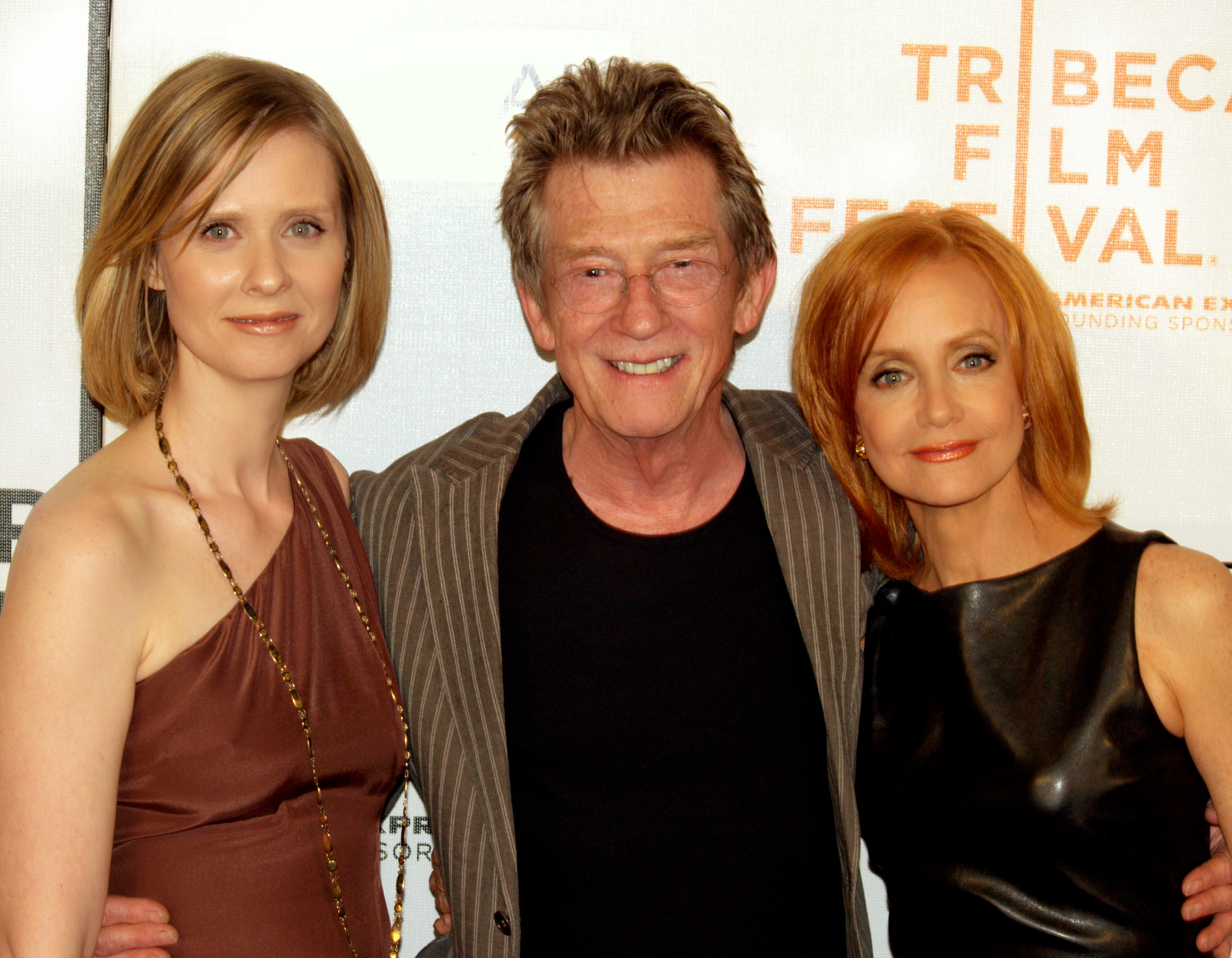
Cynthia Nixon, John Hurt and Swoosie Kurtz

- John Hurt as Quentin Crisp
- Denis O'Hare as Phillip Steele (a composite character based on Crisp's friends Phillip Ward and Tom Steele)
- Jonathan Tucker as Patrick Angus, an American artist and Crisp's friend
- Swoosie Kurtz as Connie Clausen, Crisp's agent
- Cynthia Nixon as Penny Arcade, a performance artist and playwright who takes an interest in Crisp

== Reception ==
=== Critical reception ===
On review aggregator website Rotten Tomatoes, the film holds an approval rating of 70%, based on 10 reviews, and an average rating of 6.53/10.

=== Awards ===
In 2010, An Englishman in New York was nominated for a GLAAD Media Award for Outstanding TV Movie or Mini-Series during the 21st GLAAD Media Awards, but lost to Prayers for Bobby.
