= Jonathan Tucker =

American actor (born 1982)

- Tucker at the 2026 Toronto International Film Festival.
- Born: Jonathan Moss Tucker; May 31, 1982 (age 44); Boston, Massachusetts, U.S.
- Occupation: Actor
- Years active: 1994–present
- Spouse: Tara Ahamed (m. 2012)
- Children: 2
- Father: Paul Hayes Tucker
- Relatives: Carlton J. H. Hayes (great-grandfather); Mary Evelyn Tucker (aunt)

Jonathan Moss Tucker (born May 31, 1982) is an American actor. He is known for his roles in the films The Virgin Suicides (1999), The Texas Chainsaw Massacre (2003), Hostage (2005), In the Valley of Elah (2007), The Ruins (2008), and Charlie's Angels (2019). He has appeared in the television series The Black Donnellys (2007), Parenthood (2011–2013), Kingdom (2014–2017), Justified (2015), Snowfall (2018), Westworld (2018–2022), City on a Hill (2019), and Debris (2021).

== Early life ==
Tucker was born in Boston, Massachusetts, to parents Maggie Moss, a public relations and marketing analyst and executive, and Paul Hayes Tucker, a professor of art at the University of Massachusetts Boston and a leading expert on Claude Monet. His paternal great-grandfather was historian and ambassador Carlton J. H. Hayes. His aunt and uncle, Mary Evelyn Tucker and John Grim, founded and co-direct the Yale Forum on Religion and Ecology.

His father is Irish Catholic and his mother is Jewish and of Romanian Jewish descent.

Tucker was raised in Charlestown, Massachusetts, and attended The Park School in Brookline, Massachusetts. He attended the Boston Ballet and played Fritz in their production of The Nutcracker for 5 years starting when he was in the third grade. He was featured in a Boston Ballet calendar and attended The Thacher School in Ojai, California. Tucker said of his ballet experience, "Ballet is one of the more difficult rigors that I've ever done. The Ballet instructors are some of the most intimidating people I've met."

== Career ==
Tucker first started off in film by appearing in the early 1990s films Botte di Natale (1994), Two If by Sea (1996) and Sleepers (1996) before being cast in the 1999 film The Virgin Suicides as Tim Weiner.

He starred as Matthew in the 2000 comedy film 100 Girls. A year later, he co-starred in Sundance hit The Deep End with Tilda Swinton and Josh Lucas. In 2003, Tucker was cast in the much anticipated re-imagining of the 1974 horror film of the same name, The Texas Chainsaw Massacre produced by Michael Bay and directed by Marcus Nispel. In 2004, he appeared in the films Stateside and Criminal.

In the 2005 film Hostage, Tucker worked alongside Bruce Willis and Ben Foster. Tucker plays Dennis Cooper, one of the brothers that, along with their mysterious accomplice Mars, holds a family hostage. Tucker was directed by Paul Haggis twice in 2007: he starred as Tommy Lee Jones's son in the film In the Valley of Elah as a soldier who is permanently changed by war after returning from Iraq; he also played Tommy Donnelly in the NBC TV series The Black Donnellys.

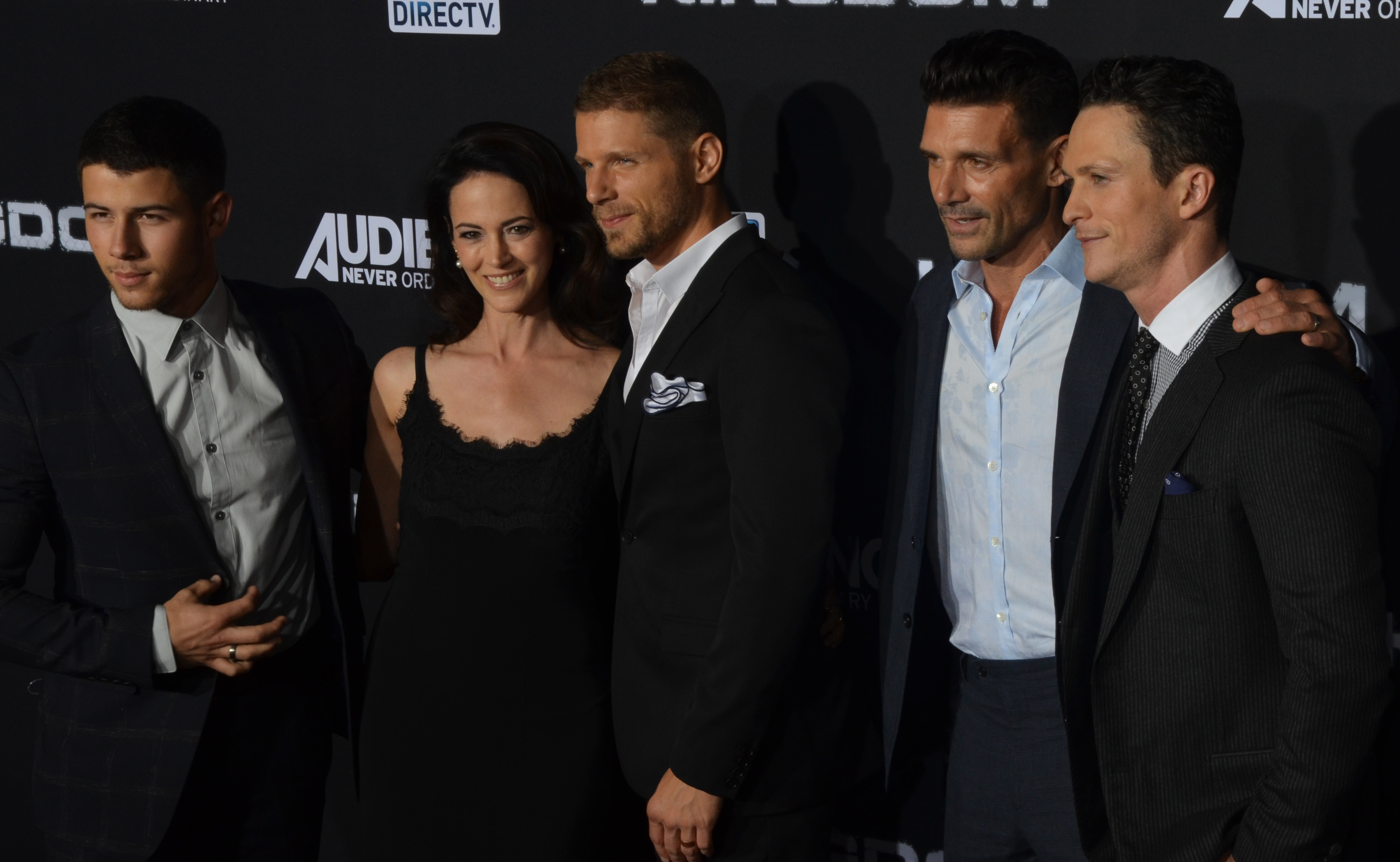
Nick Jonas, Joanna Going, Matt Lauria, Frank Grillo and Tucker at the premiere of the Kingdom in October 2014

In 2008, he was cast in The Ruins, a thriller based on the novel by Scott Smith and directed by Carter Smith.

He portrayed emerging artist Patrick Angus in the 2009 film An Englishman in New York, opposite John Hurt as Quentin Crisp. The biographical drama chronicles Crisp's later years spent in New York City. He then appeared in the 2010 film The Next Three Days with Russell Crowe and Elizabeth Banks, marking his third collaboration with Haggis.

It was announced in November 2011 that Tucker had signed on to the TV series Parenthood. He played the role of Mayor Bob Little from 2011 to 2014.

Tucker had a main role on the 2014 DirecTV drama series Kingdom. He played Jay, a mixed martial artist and son of trainer, Alvey Kulina, for which he was nominated for Best Supporting Actor by Entertainment Weekly, which described his work as "one of the most electric performances on television."

In 2015, Tucker also appeared in the final five episodes of the TV series Justified on FX as the crazy-eyed Boon — a cross between Billy the Kid and Travis Bickle.

Continuing his collaboration with Bryan Fuller, having appeared in the second season of Hannibal, Tucker starred as Low-Key Lyesmith in Starz's American Gods, adapted from Neil Gaiman's 2001 novel.

Tucker co-wrote the song "Champagne Problems" on Nick Jonas' 2016 album Last Year Was Complicated.

Further down his career in 2017, Tucker provided his face, voice and performance in a famous video game called Call of Duty: WWII as "PFC Robert Zussman". His character was one of the main protagonists of the story and his role was respected by the video game community.

Beginning in 2019, Tucker played Frankie Ryan, a Boston gangster, in the Showtime crime drama City on a Hill.

In 2021, Tucker played the lead role of CIA operative Bryan Beneventi in the short-lived NBC science fiction series Debris.

== Personal life ==
On June 16, 2012, Tucker married Tara Ahamed, daughter of economic historian Liaquat Ahamed. They have twins, a son and daughter born May 15, 2019.

Tucker practices Transcendental Meditation to offset loneliness on film locations. He is the founder of the nonprofit organization Pegasus Fund.

In June 2024, he helped evacuate a neighboring family from their home during a home invasion.

== Works ==
=== Film ===
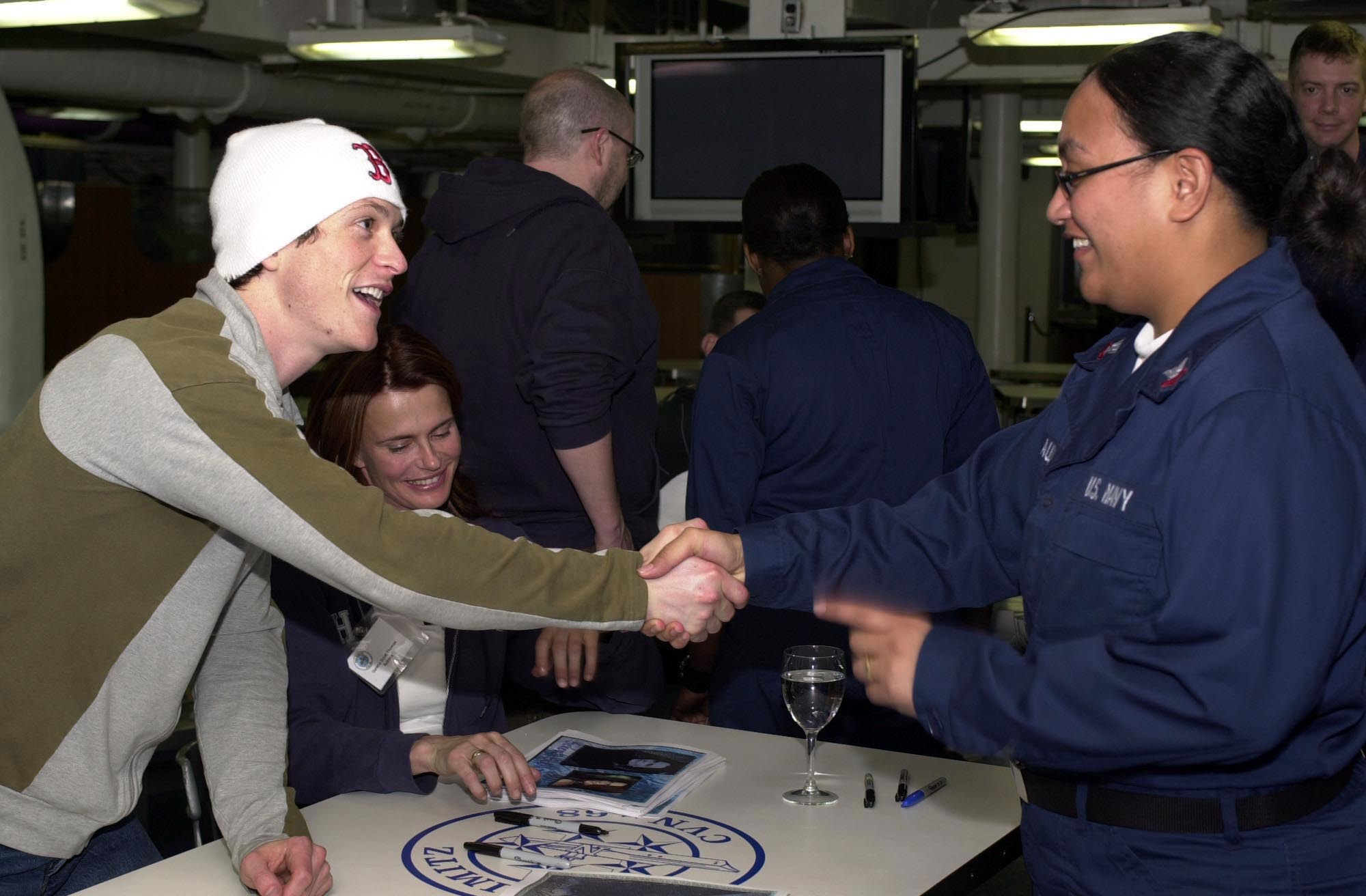
Tucker (left) and Serena Scott Thomas on the aircraft carrier USS Nimitz greeting sailors to promote the film Hostage in March 2005

Year	Title	Role	Notes
1994	Troublemakers	Moses Junior	a.k.a. The Fight Before Christmas and Botte di Natale
1996	Two If by Sea	Todd	a.k.a. Stolen Hearts
1996	Sleepers	Young Tommy Marcano	
1999	The Virgin Suicides	Tim Weiner	
2000	100 Girls	Matthew	
2001	The Deep End	Beau Hall	
2001	Relative Evil	JJ	Also titled Ball in the House
2003	The Texas Chainsaw Massacre	Morgan	
2004	Stateside	Mark Deloach	a.k.a. Sinners
2004	Criminal	Michael	
2005	Hostage	Dennis Kelly	
2005	Bee Season	Student (uncredited)	
2006	Pulse	Josh	
2006	Love Comes to the Executioner	Heck Prigusivac	
2007	Cherry Crush	Jordan Wells	
2007	Day 73 with Sarah	David	Short film
2007	In the Valley of Elah	Mike Deerfield	
2008	The Ruins	Jeff	
2009	An Englishman in New York	Patrick Angus	
2009	Veronika Decides to Die	Edward	
2010	Flying Lessons	Billy	
2010	Meskada	Shane Loakin	
2010	The Next Three Days	David	
2018	Skin	Jeffrey	
2019	Charlie's Angels	Hodak	
2022	Palm Trees and Power Lines	Tom	
2023	God Is a Bullet	Errol Grey	

=== Television ===
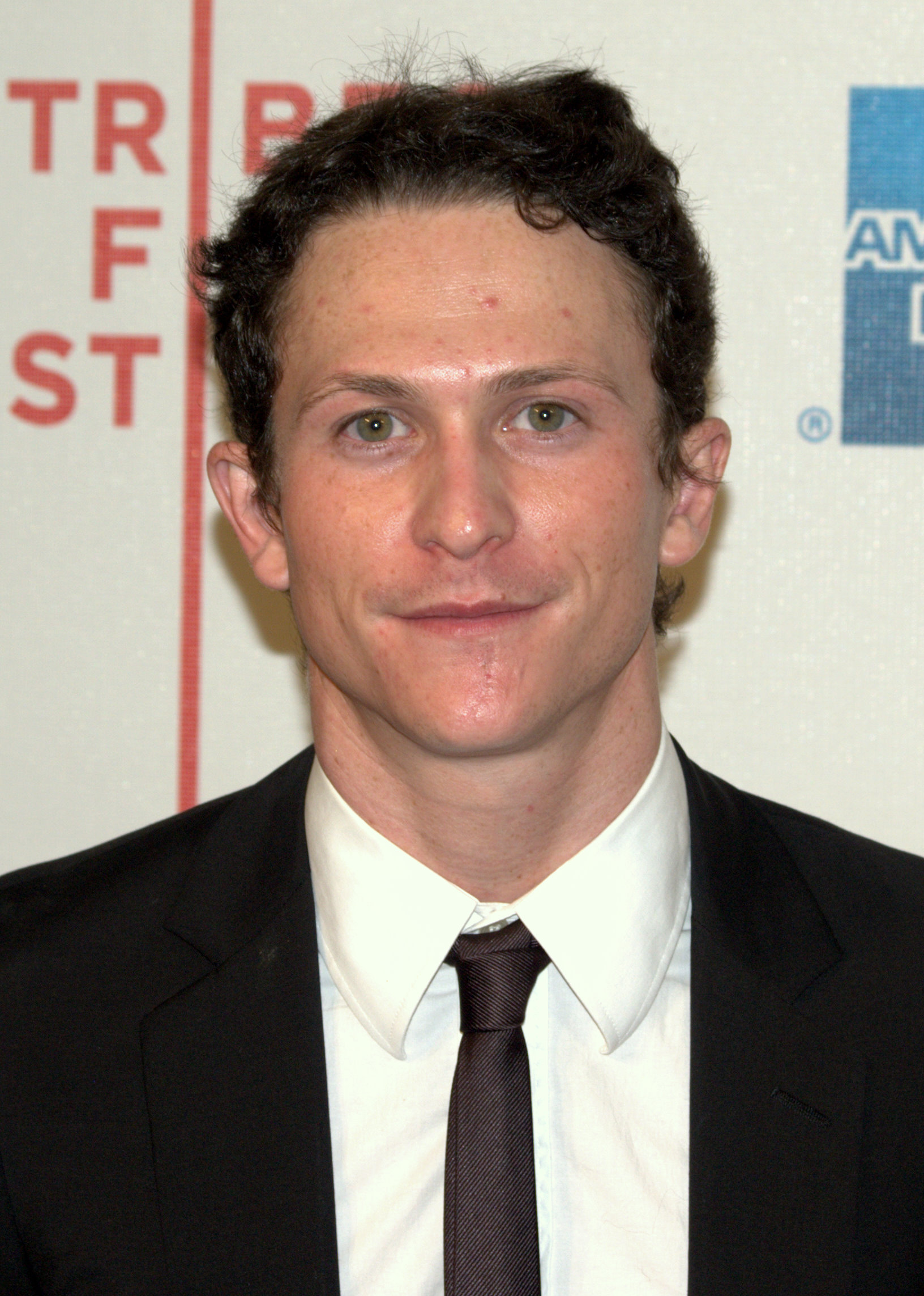
Tucker at the 2009 Tribeca Film Festival

Television
Year	Title	Role	Notes
1997	Early Edition	Tony	Episode: "Frostbite"
1998	Mr. Music	Rob Tennant	TV film
2001	The Practice	Chad Baldwin / "James Tucker"	Episode: "Vanished: Part 1 & 2"
2002	Philly	Eli Wexler	Episode: "The Curse of the Klopman Diamonds"
2003	CSI: Crime Scene Investigation	Peter Arnz	Episode: "Crash and Burn"
2003	Law & Order: Special Victims Unit	Ian Tate	Episode: "Abomination"
2004	Six Feet Under	Bruno Baskerville Walsh	Episode: "Falling into Place"
2005	Masters of Horror	Jak	Episode: "Dance of the Dead"
2006	Law & Order: Criminal Intent	Drew Ramsey	Episode: "Wrongful Life"
2007	The Black Donnellys	Tommy Donnelly	Main role
2010	White Collar	Avery Phillips	Episode: "Hard Sell"
2011	Criminal Minds	Raymond Donovan	Episode: "The Thirteenth Step"
2011	Royal Pains	Shaw Morgan	2 episodes
2011–2013	Parenthood	Bob Little	10 episodes
2012	Perception	Brady McGraw	Episode: "Nemesis"
2012	Person of Interest	Riley Cavanaugh	Episode: "Triggerman"
2012	Ro	Jordan	5 episodes
2014	Hannibal	Matthew Brown	2 episodes
2014	High Moon	Stanislav "Stan" Stavin	TV pilot
2014–2017	Kingdom	Jay Kulina	Main role
2015	Justified	Boon	5 episodes
2017	American Gods	Low Key Lyesmith	Episode: "The Bone Orchard"
2018–2022	Westworld	Major Craddock	7 episodes
2018–2019	Snowfall	Matt McDonald	10 episodes
2019	City on a Hill	Frankie Ryan	Recurring role
2020	Monsterland	Alex	Episode: "Port Fourchon, LA"
2021	Debris	Bryan Beneventi	Main role
2022	Echoes	Dylan James	Main role
2026	I Will Find You	Adam Mackenzie	Post-production

=== Video games ===
Year	Title	Voice role	Notes
2017	Call of Duty: WWII	Private First Class Robert Zussman	Likeness and motion capture

== Awards and nominations ==
Year	Award	Category	Nominated work	Result
2000	Young Artist Awards	Best Performance in a TV Movie or Pilot – Leading Young Actor	Mr. Music	Nominated
2005	DVD Exclusive Awards	Best Actor in a DVD Premiere Movie	Relative Evil	Nominated
2008	Young Hollywood Awards	Standout Performance	Jonathan Tucker	Won
2008	Scream Awards	Best Horror Actor	Jonathan Tucker	Nominated
2023	Independent Spirit Awards	Best Supporting Performance	Palm Trees and Power Lines	Nominated
