= Undressing Israel: Gay Men in the Promised Land =

- Directed by: Michael Lucas; Yariv Mozer
- Written by: Daniel Salaris
- Produced by: Michael Lucas
- Release date: 2012
- Running time: 46 minutes
- Country: Israel
- Language: English / Hebrew

Undressing Israel: Gay Men in the Promised Land is a 46-minute documentary written by American adult-film entrepreneur, columnist, gay activist and gay pornographic film director Michael Lucas, and co-directed by Lucas and Israeli director Yariv Mozer. In his debut as a documentary filmmaker, Michael Lucas portrays in this film released in 2012 Israel's thriving GLBT community through footage of Tel Aviv's vibrant nightlife, a same-sex wedding, and candid interviews with a diverse range of local Israeli gay men and lesbians, including a gay MP, an openly gay Army trainer, a drag queen, a transvestite, a young Arab-Israeli journalist, and same-sex parents raising their children and a number of artists and activists.

== Screenings ==
The film premiered at the Los Angeles Cinema Festival of Hollywood on January 13, 2013, and has shown in various LGBT and general film festivals including at Out In The Desert 2013 (Tucson, Arizona), Atlanta Jewish Film Festival (Atlanta, Georgia), Queergestreift Film Festival (Konstanz, Germany), the Polish LGBT Film Festival (Warsaw, Poland), Philadelphia QFest (Philadelphia, Pennsylvania). It premiered in Israel on June 26, 2013, during the Tel Aviv LGBT International Film Festival.

== Cast ==
Appearances in alphabetical order:

- Hader Rayan Abu-Seif
- Yoav Arad
- Yossi Berg
- Eliad Cohen
- Eytan Fox
- Yehonathan Gatro
- Mickey Gitzen
- Nitzan Horowitz
- Amit Alexander Lev
- Alon Levi
- Ivri Lider
- Andrey Nozdrin
- Itai Pinkas
- Rafi Vazana
