= Patrick Angus =

American painter

- Born: Patrick Morton Angus; December 3, 1953; North Hollywood, California
- Died: May 13, 1992 (aged 38); New York City, New York
- Known for: American Social-Realist paintings
- Movement: Social-Realism
- Patrons: David Hockney, Robert B. Stuart, Douglas Blair Turnbaugh

Patrick Angus (December 3, 1953 – May 13, 1992) was a 20th-century American painter who, among many other works, created a number acrylic paintings of the interior of the Gaiety Theater and some of its dancers and customers in the 1980s. Some of the titles are: Grand Finale (1985), The Apollo Room I (1986), Remember the Promise You Made (1986), Slave to the Rhythm (1986), All The Love in the World (1987), and Hanky Panky (1991).

Although a dedicated creator of portraits and still lifes, and an occasional designer of stage settings, Angus is principally known for works begun in 1981 depicting the young male erotic dancers at the Gaiety and other New York showplaces. Referring to an earlier French painter who made his reputation depicting the demi-monde, playwright Robert Patrick deemed Angus "The Toulouse-Lautrec of Times Square". Angus died on May 13, 1992, from complications related to AIDS.

== In popular culture ==
Angus appears as himself in the 1990 documentary movie Resident Alien about Quentin Crisp in New York. Angus is portrayed by actor Jonathan Tucker in the 2009 dramatic movie An Englishman in New York, a biographical picture about Crisp's later years. Crisp befriends Angus in both films and encourages him to show his work.
