= Gaiety Theatre (male burlesque) =

Former male burlesque theatre in New York City, United States (1975-2005)

Coordinates: 40°45′31″N 73°59′07″W

- Interactive map of Gaiety Theatre
- Address: 201 West 46th Street; New York; United States
- Location: Times Square, Manhattan
- Owner: Denise Rozis
- Operator: Denise Rozis and Evridiki Rozis
- Type: Male burlesque

Construction
- Opened: 1975
- Closed: March 17, 2005
- Demolished: 2005

The Gaiety Theatre was a gay male burlesque theater in Times Square, New York City, for almost 30 years until it closed on March 17, 2005. The name on the awning over the entrance was Gaiety Theatre, but it was also called the Gaiety Male Burlesque or the Gaiety Male Theatre in advertisements. It was located at 201 W 46th Street, New York, NY 10036, on the second floor of the building that also housed what was the last Howard Johnson's restaurant in New York City. The Gaiety opened in late 1975 and closed in 2005 and was owned by Denise Rozis, run by both her and her younger sister, Evridiki Rozis.

The building has been demolished but was owned by the Kenneth Rubinstein family (Rubenstein Klein Realty) for many years until it was sold to Jeff Sutton's Wharton Acquisitions. The Howard Johnson's restaurant closed later on July 8, 2005, at midnight, after having been open for 46 years.

"Gaiety" and phone number, scribbled on torn paper found in East Village apartment 2016

This theatre was not the same Gaiety Theatre that was across 46th Street at 1547 Broadway, which did house burlesque, including Minsky's for a time during its long history (1908–82). That Gaiety is probably best remembered as the Victoria Cinema, but its final name was Embassy 5, before the building was demolished.

A New York Times article published on April 24, 2005, about the closing of the Gaiety referred to “ … the lore that set the Gaiety apart from other clubs: the mainstream attention it attracted after photos of Madonna and some of the club’s dancers were included in her book Sex (1992). The cachet of visitors like John Waters, Andy Warhol, and Shirley MacLaine, and the club’s unrivaled ability to survive, despite the strict zoning laws instituted during the Giuliani administration, thanks to a location just outside a restricted area.”

Blogger Andy Towle said: “The Gaiety opened its doors on a winter night in 1976 and consistently attracted an interesting mix of young hustlers, businessmen, tourists, and celebrities on the DL to its pleasantly dingy, boxy room with its small stage and sparkling curtain.”

The Gaiety survived Mayor Rudolph Giuliani's intense drive to close adult related venues in the mid-1990s. Heavy security was instituted and no sexual activities of any kind were permitted in the theatre.

== The Gaiety in Popular Culture ==
Patrick Angus (1953–1992), a late 20th-century American painter, created a number of oil or acrylic paintings of the interior of the Gaiety and some of its dancers and customers in the 1980s. Some of those titles are: Grand Finale (1985), The Apollo Room I (1986), Remember the Promise You Made (1986), Slave to the Rhythm (1986), All The Love in the World (1987), Hanky Panky (1991)

Madonna's famous 1992 book Sex contained many pictures taken in the Gaiety and of the Gaiety dancers. After the book came out, the Gaiety became chic and many dancers and patrons were not entirely happy with the visitors that resulted. There were pictures from that photo shoot posted on the wall in the theater's Apollo lounge for years. Her sexually themed music video Erotica (1992) was also partially shot there.

The Gaiety was the setting for the gay pornographic movie Times Square Strip (1982), produced by Hand In Hand Films, which had a plotline that revolved around the lives of dancers at the club and their performances on stage.

== Notable visitors and dancers at the Gaiety ==
Joey Stefano danced at the Gaiety in the late 1980s and early 1990s. He was one of the more famous Gaiety dancers (and porn stars), having been featured in Madonna's Sex book in 1992, as well as having a biography written about him by Charles Isherwood, Wonder Bread and Ecstasy, that touches on his life as an erotic dancer at the Gaiety.

Some of the porn stars and notable entertainers that have danced at the Gaiety: Will Clark, Billy Brandt, Chris Williams, Christian Fox, Gianfranco, Carlos Morales, Rod Barry, Jason Adonis, Tristan Adonis, Hunter James, Mark Dalton, Johnny Harden, Kip Noll, Leo Ford and Adam Champ. Angelo Garcia, a former member of famed Puerto Rican boy band Menudo also briefly worked as a dancer at the Gaiety. Actor Patrick Swayze is said to have danced there.

Other celebrities that have visited the Gaiety: RuPaul, Robin Byrd, John Rutherford, Andy Warhol, pornographer Paul Morris, John Waters, Divine, Diane Keaton and Shirley MacLaine; Cilla Black, Lady Bunny, Paul O'Grady, Randy Wicker and Raquel Reyes

== See also ==
- List of strip clubs
