= Lucas Entertainment =

New York-based gay pornographic studio

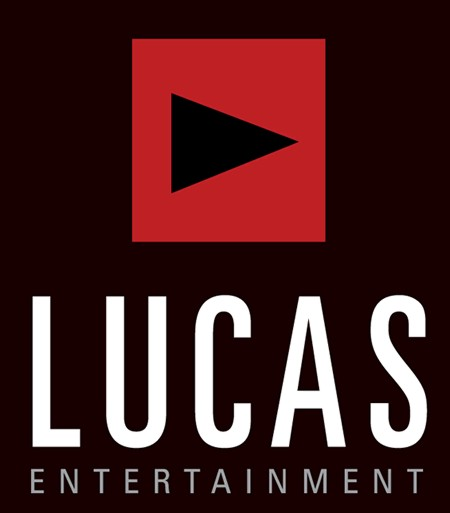
- Type: Private
- Industry: Gay pornography
- Founded: 1998; 28 years ago in New York City
- Headquarters: New York, New York, United States
- Key people: Michael Lucas
- Products: Pornographic films, internet pornography and sex toys
- Website: www.lucasentertainment.com

Lucas Entertainment is an independent New York-based gay pornographic studio founded by porn star Michael Lucas in 1998. It is one of the largest such studios in the world. The studio is known for lavish, big-budget films, and it contends that its 2006 film Michael Lucas' La Dolce Vita is the most expensive gay porn ever made. The film won 14 GayVN awards in 2007, the current record.

To expand its direction, the studio hired mr. Pam Doré, gay adult film's only female videographer, as creative director of film and production in August 2008. Doré, who began her career at Falcon Video in 1996, was nominated for best director and cinematography at the GayVN Awards for the studio's 2008 Return to Fire Island.

In May 2009, Lucas Entertainment announced that it was filming on location the first gay porn film with only Israeli models, billing it as an effort to promote Israeli culture. The company subsequently launched its Men of Israel microsite introducing the actors and film concept. Lucas has called the film his most important, and journalists from The Atlantic, Out Magazine and Yediot Aharonot noted it as a landmark film as the first pornographic film shot on location with an all-Israeli cast; while Tablet Magazine and the Los Angeles Times remarked on it being the first to feature an all-Jewish cast.

In July, the studio announced on Lucas's blog that it will open a European headquarters in Paris, the site of its current production, Paris Playboys. In 2013 Lucas Entertainment went from being exclusively a condom-only studio to filming and releasing "bareback" sex content.

== History ==
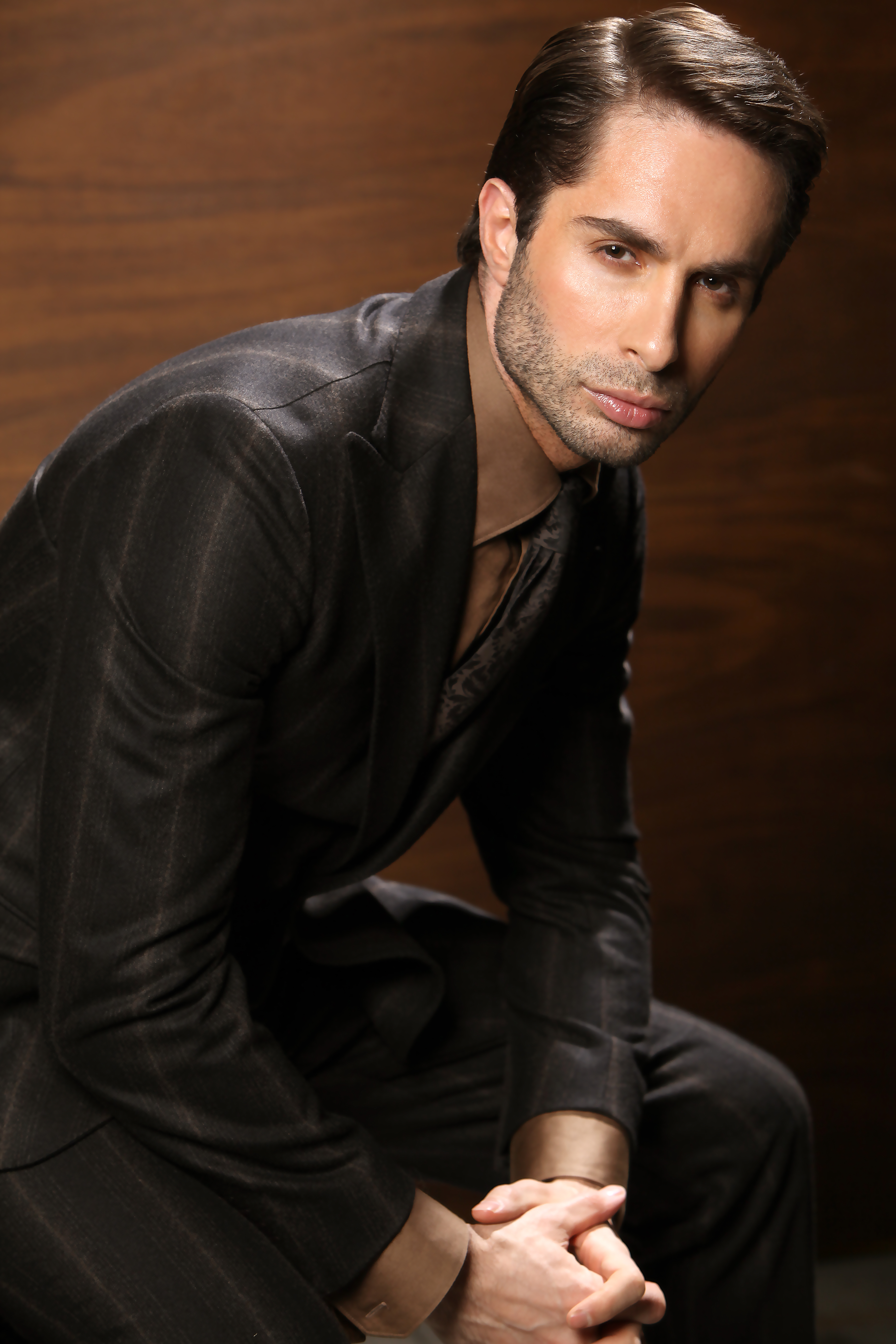
Michael Lucas, the founder/CEO of Lucas Entertainment.

Michael Lucas founded his own production company, Lucas Entertainment, in 1998. He based the company in New York City (rather than Los Angeles, where many of the other pornography studios are located), in part, to take advantage of the lack of competition.

In 2004, Lucas Distribution, Inc., his adult video distribution company, began operations. Lucas directs, produces and stars in his own films under the Lucas Entertainment banner. In March 2009 the studio hired Mr. Pam Doré as creative director of film and production. Doré was the videographer and editor for NakedSword's Tim & Roma Show. Doré, a 12-year veteran of the business, had shot and edited award-winning films for COLT Studio Group and Black Scorpion Entertainment, amongst others. She was nominated at the 2009 GayVN Awards for best director and cinematography for the studio's 2008 Return to Fire Island. In an interview, mr. Pam stated that she fulfills many roles on set, including "kick-ass cameraman, slutty friend or 'Mommy' if the boys need a hug or someone to talk with."

The studio announced on Lucas's blog in July 2009 that it was opening a European headquarters in Paris. The new office will centralize production services, including casting, filming, and promotions. The studio last filmed in France in October 2001 for Inside Paris, and announced it was to begin filming Paris Playboys in the city's gay district, Le Marais.

== Productions ==
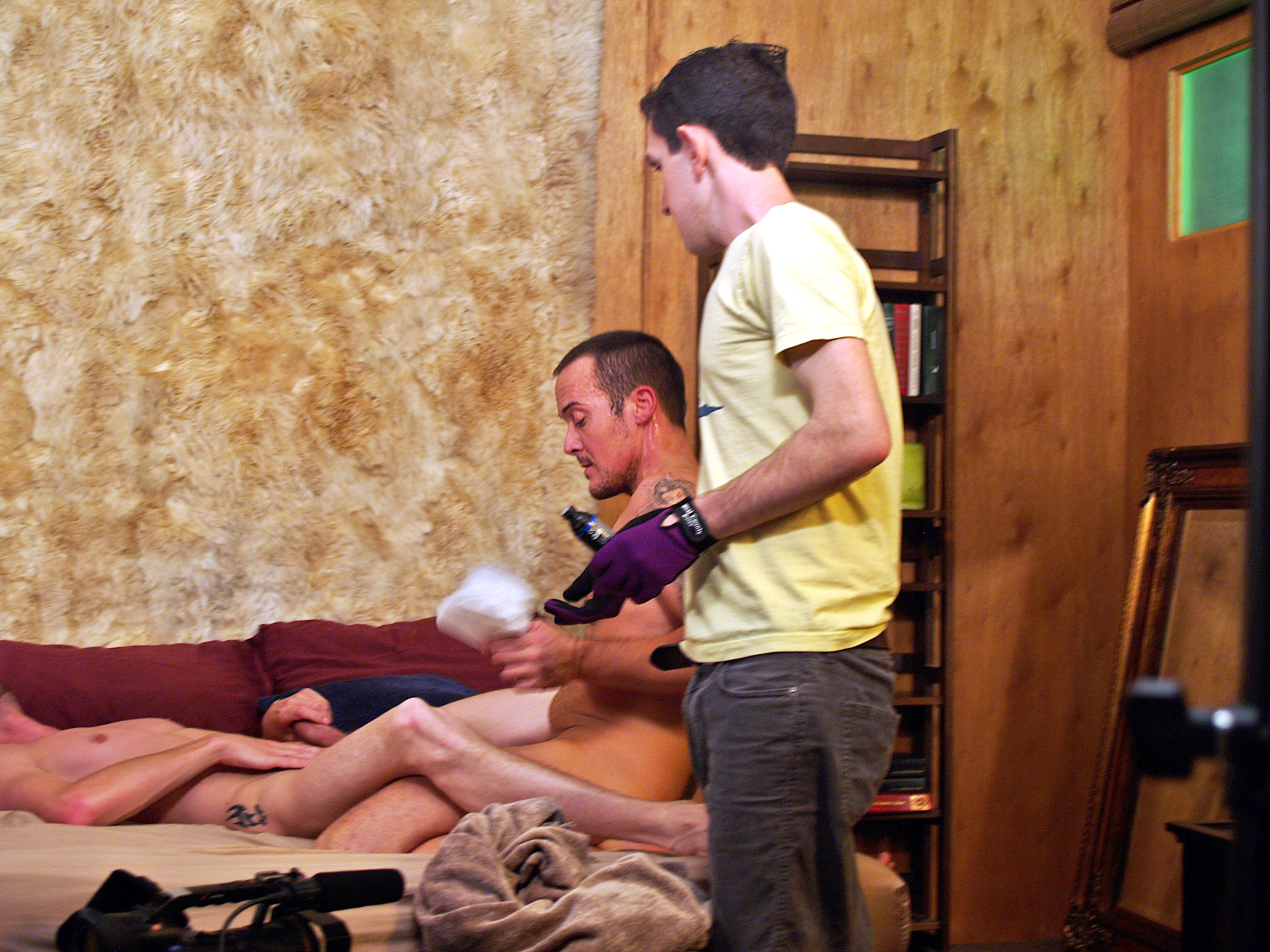
A fluffer hands Jake Starr and Erik Grant accouterments for a scene in the studio's 2008 production Pounding the Pavement.

The studio is known for lavish, big-budget productions that approach gay pornography combining technical filmmaking expertise and raunch. The studio released its Gigolo in 2007. The film explored the underworld of New York City escorting and hustling. When same-year The Intern won more GayVN Awards than the big production Gigolo, studio head Lucas was bothered, stating that "even a retard" would not have chosen the one over the other.

=== Michael Lucas' Dangerous Liaisons ===
In the summer of 2005 Lucas released Michael Lucas' Dangerous Liaisons; the film featured celebrity cameos from RuPaul, Boy George, Graham Norton, Bruce Vilanch, Lady Bunny, Amanda Lepore, and Michael Musto.

=== Michael Lucas' La Dolce Vita ===
In 2006, the studio released Michael Lucas' La Dolce Vita Parts 1 & 2, a gay pornographic remake of the 1960 Fellini classic La Dolce Vita. At a budget of $250,000, the studio contends it is the most expensive gay pornographic film ever made. The film won a record fourteen awards at the 2007 GayVN Awards, winning in every category in which it was nominated.

In February 2007, International Media Films, Inc., which owns the rights to Fellini's La Dolce Vita, filed suit against Lucas (as Andrei Treivas Bregman), Lucas Entertainment, Inc., and Lucas Distribution, Inc. for trademark and copyright infringement. The lawsuit seeks to collect unspecified damages and to stop sales of Michael Lucas' La Dolce Vita Parts 1 & 2. At the preliminary injunction hearing in April, 2007, the attorney for the plaintiff asked the judge to enjoin further distribution of Lucas' film, which he refused to do.

=== Men of Israel ===
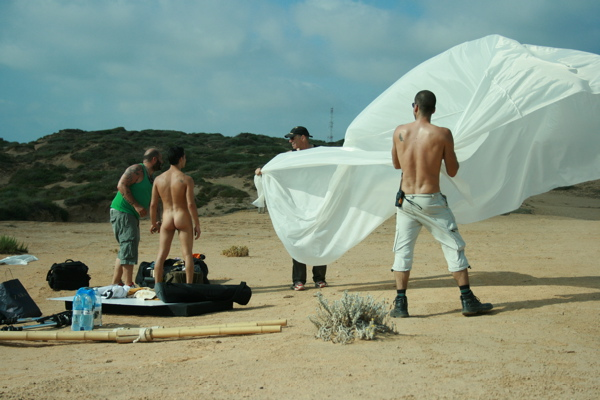
On location for the filming of the 2009 release Men of Israel, the first adult film to use exclusively Jewish models.

In May 2009, Lucas Entertainment filmed the first gay porn film using only Israeli models. The production was billed as a sexual journey to promote Israeli culture. In June 2009 the company launched its Men of Israel website to promote the film, which announced its release for July 22.

The film received press coverage. Writing in Tablet Magazine, Wayne Hoffman observed that although mainstream publications from The Atlantic to Out Magazine to Yedioth Aharonoth called the project a landmark as the first gay adult film to feature an all-Israeli cast, Hoffman felt it was a landmark for featuring the first all-Jewish cast.

The openly all-Jewish cast was also remarked upon by the Los Angeles Times blog, which noted that whenever Jews are more open about their Jewish identity it is a "healthy development".

Lucas, however, openly opposed the New York City's Lesbian, Gay, Bisexual and Transgender Community Center's recent (2011) decision to allow a group that opposes Israeli government policies toward Palestinians to meet there. "Calling the Center an 'anti-Israeli nest' and [Glennda] Testone [the Center's executive director] and Mario Palumbo, the Center's board president, 'staunch anti-Zionists,' Lucas, in a series of emails, asked friends to stop donating to the Center and to contact elected officials to stop any government support." "Asked ... to compare the response to his most recent boycott threat to [an] earlier one, Lucas wrote, 'This group has had their first and last meeting in the Center. If someone fucks with Israel, I fuck them back. And I usually win.'"

== Film lines ==
Lucas Entertainment – The flagship brand featuring gay sex with men in their 20s and 30s.

Lucas Raunch – An extreme fetish line. The first releases were FARTS! and PISS!. In February 2009 the Canada Border Services Agency detained and banned both films. The CBSA's Policy On The Classification Of Obscene Material states that the "ingestion of someone else's urine... with a sexual purpose" made the films obscene, which was cause for banning them.

Sex In Suits – The studio's third line to be launched as its own independent website. Sex In Suits collects Lucas Entertainment's "Gentlemen" line of gay adult films featuring men in suits, which started in 2011 and other business-oriented items. The scenes are filmed in professional settings, allowing the studio to take advantage of its New York City home base. Current scenes on the Sex In Suits website feature bareback sex content.

== Publicity campaigns ==
In 2007 LE sent out a fake press release stating that Lucas had been found dead in his apartment. A photo accompanying the release showed what appeared to be a bound, lifeless Lucas with a conspicuous bruise on his face. New York magazine's Daily Intel blog questioned the timing of the stunt, which occurred one week after the surprise death of New York performer and Velvet Mafia singer Dean Johnson. The resulting media attention won the studio an Xbiz Award for Best Publicity Stunt.

In conjunction with the German publisher Bruno Gmünder, the studio released the photography book Michael Lucas' Gigolos, which featured many LE models in highly sexualized situations. It included work by photographer Joe Oppedisano, and was lauded for its high production quality as it was designed to be a pornographic fashion book to accompany the studio's film release Gigolos.

After the Lucas Raunch releases FARTS! and PISS! were banned in Canada, Lucas released a letter in the media addressed to President Barack Obama asking for him to intercede on the studio's behalf at an upcoming summit with the Canadian prime minister Stephen Harper.

The LGBTQ blog Queerty responded to a studio marketing video that showed Michael Lucas simulating oral sex both with and on a Barbie doll. While acknowledging the overt attempt to draw traffic to his site with the video as linkbait, Queerty expressed admiration for Lucas' ability to create buzz for his company in the rapidly changing adult entertainment industry.

== Awards and recognition ==
The studio has garnered many GayVN Awards and Adult Erotic Gay Video Awards ("Grabbys") nominations and wins.

Timothy Greenfield-Sanders profiled Lucas in his 2004 book XXX: 30 Porn Star Photographs and the accompanying HBO documentary Thinking XXX. Greenfield-Sanders asked Lucas, then still primarily known as a performer, for a list of his ten favorite films; the films he listed were all from his own production company.

In 2020, Michael Lucas and the models of Lucas Entertainment were featured in the Gruenholtz book, "Uncensored: My Year Behind the Scenes with Michael Lucas and His Models." The book documents photography by Gruenholtz as he shadowed Lucas and his productions over the course of one year in New York, Fire Island, Puerto Vallarta, and Barcelona.

At the 2009 GayVN Awards studio head Lucas was inducted into the GayVN Hall of Fame.

The studio also received a nomination for a 2010 XBIZ Award in the category of GLBT Company of the Year.

Year	Film	Actors	Awards
2000	Fire Island Cruising	Michael Lucas	GayVN Award for Best Solo Performance
2001	Top to Bottom		GayVN Award for Best Ethnic-Themed Video
2001	Vengeance	Chad Hunt; Erik Martins; Carlos Morales	GayVN Award for Best Threesome; Grabby Award for Best Threesome
2004	Michael Lucas' Auditions 1		GayVN Awards for Best PRO/AM Release
2005	Michael Lucas' Dangerous Liaisons	Gus Mattox; Michael Lucas; Kent Larson	Grabby Award for Best Actor (Mattox); GayVN Awards for Best DVD Extras/Special Edition; Best Screenplay (Tony DiMarco); Best Supporting Actor (Larson); Best Picture;
2005	Michael Lucas' Auditions 4		GayVN Awards for Best PRO/AM Release
2006	Michael Lucas' La Dolce Vita	Michael Lucas; Spencer Quest; Jason Ridge; Derrick Hanson	GayVN Awards for Best Actor (Lucas); Best Art Direction; Best Director (Lucas and Tony DiMarco); Best DVD Extras/Special Edition; Best Editing (Frank Tyler); Best Marketing Campaign; Best Music (Nekked); Best Non-Sex Performance (Savanna Samson); Best Packaging; Best Screenplay (Tony DiMarco); Best Supporting Actor (Quest); Best Threesome (Lucas/Ridge/Hanson); Best Videography; Best Picture;
2007	The Intern	Christian Cruz	GayVN Awards for Best Non-Sex Performance (Jason Shepard); Best Renting Title of 2007; Best Sex Comedy; Best Supporting Actor (Cruz)
2008	Brother Reunion		GayVN Awards for Best Non-Sex Performance (Lady Bunny)
2008	Return to Fire Island		GayVN Awards for Best Packaging
2011			XBIZ Award for Gay Web Company of the Year
2012	Assassin		XBIZ Award for Gay Movie of the Year
2013			XBIZ Award for Gay Studio of the year
2014	Original Sinners		XBIZ Award for Gay Movie of the Year

== Notable directors ==
- Michael Lucas
- mr. Pam

== Notable performers ==
- Steve Holmes
- Michael Lucas
- Gus Mattox

== See also ==
- List of performers in gay porn films
- List of gay pornographic movie studios
- Pornography
- Video Interview with Michael Lucas at Philadelphia's QFest 2010
