= Will Clark (actor) =

American gay pornographic film actor

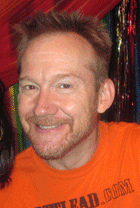
- Clark in 2010
- Born: March 9, 1968 (age 58); Wausau, Wisconsin, U.S.
- Height: 5 ft 8 in (1.73 m)
- Website: http://www.willclarkworld.com

Will Clark (born March 9, 1968) is an American gay pornographic film actor. He is a member of the Grabby Awards Hall of Fame and has received a special citation from the GayVN Awards for his fundraising work in support of HIV/AIDS charities.

== Early life and career ==
Prior to his pornographic film career, Clark was a struggling actor in New York City. "I had trouble finding roles," he told Manshots magazine. "I just didn’t fit anything. I wasn’t the type they were looking for. No one was casting a young, redheaded male. So to earn money, I started go-go dancing at The Limelight and Tunnel and the Palladium. I also started doing male escort work, and I really enjoyed that."

== Adult film career ==
A music promoter encouraged him to apply to Falcon Studios, and he was rejected. "'You’re too white, you’re too hairy, you’re a redhead. We don’t care for any of that stuff. And you need to bulk up,'" he recalled being told. Through a connection in San Francisco, California, Clark secured an audition with gay adult film director Steven Scarborough of Hot House Video and was subsequently cast in his first erotic feature, Dr. Goodglove (1996). Within a year, however, Clark had indeed added a significant amount of muscle, as well as begun to appear in leather and BDSM pornographic films. Clark subsequently appeared in around 50 pornographic films in a variety of genres, although reviewers say leather and BDSM roles were his best performances.

Clark's pornographic film career started around 1995 and ended in around 2006.

Clark has managed his image and public persona to maintain his popularity. "I’ve been good at marketing on the Web. I take care of my fans when I tour—give them pictures and promotional materials," he told one interviewer. "The columns I write and the fund-raisers I do help raise awareness of my presence. Everything sort of blends together."

== HIV/AIDS activism ==
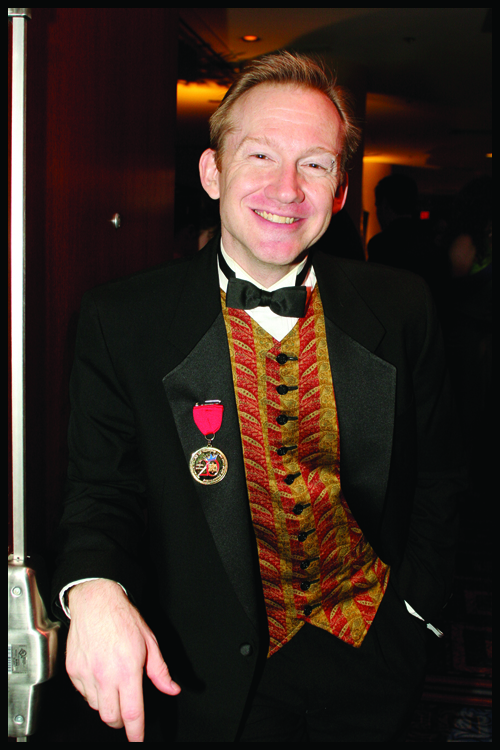
Clark in 2006.

Clark's HIV/AIDS activism-fundraising efforts began in 1997 when he volunteered with Stop AIDS Chicago and Aid for AIDS. A series of fundraisers began one year later. "I did this birthday party for myself and Dino DiMarco and Sam Dixon in March of ’98. And after that, I was talking to Mickey Skee and he was doing promotion for his Bad Boys of Video book. And I was in the book, and I thought some other guys in the book would make great bartenders. I said, 'Hey, why not call it the Bad Boys Pool Party and promote Mickey’s book and the guys in the book?' And that became the hook of the party. And it evolved from that. The first party earned $8,300, and the second earned $10,600." Clark produced fundraisers featuring variations on this and similar themes in Los Angeles, Palm Springs, and San Francisco. As of 2008, he continued to produce similar events in New York City.

== Writing career ==
Clark has been a published magazine article author - being a regular contributor to Dude magazine, International Leatherman, and Pulp (a fashion and style magazine published in Palm Springs, California).

Two children's plays of his have been produced on the southern California stage. Clark has written and performed in an autobiographic theatrical solo show entitled Altered Ego; the show was performed several times between 2002 and 2004. Reviews were rare but positive. One reviewer noted, "Clark immediately establishes a rapport with his audience. Here is a wonderful performer who feels comfortable and natural with his remarks."

== Awards and nominations ==
- 1997 Men in Video Awards winner - Best Bushwhacker
- 1998 Grabby Award winner (tie with Cole Tucker) - Performer of the Year
- 1998 GayVN Award winner - Performer Special Achievement Award for AIDS Causes
- 1998 Gay Erotic Video Award winner - Leo Ford Humanitarian Award
- 1998 Men in Video Awards winner - Best Bushwhacker
- 2002 Grabby Awards Hall of Fame inductee

Clark also won the "Northeast Mr. Drummer" title in 1997, which qualified him to compete for the International Mister Leather title, where he did not win.

== Selected videography ==
- 3 Degrees of Humiliation (MSR Videos)
- Country Hustler (Oh Man! Studios)
- Island Guardian (Titan Media)
- Michael Lucas' La Dolce Vita (Lucas Entertainment) - nonsex cameo
- Night Walk (HIS Video)
- A Porn Star is Born (Raging Stallion Studios) - nonsex cameo
- Red Star (Raging Stallion)

== See also ==
- List of male performers in gay porn films
