= Michael Lucas' La Dolce Vita =

- Cover art of the first part of Michael Lucas' La Dolce Vita
- Directed by: Michael Lucas; Tony Dimarco
- Written by: Tony Dimarco
- Based on: La Dolce Vita by: Federico Fellini; Ennio Flaiano; Tullio Pinelli; Brunello Rondi
- Produced by: Michael Lucas
- Starring: Michael Lucas
- Edited by: Frank Tyler
- Music by: Nekked
- Distributed by: Lucas Distribution
- Release date: 2006
- Country: United States
- Language: English

Michael Lucas' La Dolce Vita is a 2006 gay pornographic remake of the Federico Fellini classic film La Dolce Vita, directed by Michael Lucas and Tony Dimarco and released by Lucas Entertainment.

The film stars Michael Lucas, Jason Ridge, Chad Hunt, Cole Ryan, Pete Ross, Derrick Hanson, Ray Star, Brad Star, Jack Bond, Wilson Vasquez, Jonathan Vargas, Ben Andrews, and more. It features non-sexual cameos by Savanna Samson, Kevin Aviance, Amanda Lepore, Heather Fink, Will Clark and Johnny Hanson.

Lucas contends that the film is the most expensive gay porn film ever made due to a budget of $250,000 and multiple celebrity cameos.

== Cast ==
- Ben Andrews
- Rod Barry
- Jack Bond
- Jamie Donovan
- Erik Grant
- Derrick Hanson
- Michael Lucas
- Jack MacCarthy
- Spencer Quest
- Pete Ross
- Cole Ryan
- Brad Star
- Ray Star
- Jonathan Vargas
- Wilson Vasquez

== Cameos (non-sexual) ==
- Savanna Samson
- Gus Mattox
- Amanda Lepore
- Michael Musto
- Kevin Aviance
- Johnny Hanson
- Will Clark
- Heather Fink

== Awards ==
In 2007 at the GayVN's in San Francisco, it won all 14 awards it was nominated for, including best picture, best director (Michael Lucas & Tony DiMarco), best threesome (Michael Lucas, Derrick Hanson, and Jason Ridge), best actor (Michael Lucas) and best non-sexual performance (Savanna Samson).

- 2007 GayVN Award: Best Picture
- 2007 GayVN Award: Best Actor
- 2007 GayVN Award: Best Threesome
- 2007 GayVN Award: Best Director
- 2007 GayVN Award: Best Supporting Actor
- 2007 GayVN Award: Best Non-Sex Performance
- 2007 GayVN Award: Best Screenplay
- 2007 GayVN Award: Best Editing
- 2007 GayVN Award: Best Music
- 2007 GayVN Award: Best Art Direction
- 2007 GayVN Award: Best Videography
- 2007 GayVN Award: Best DVD Extras/Special Edition
- 2007 GayVN Award: Best Packaging
- 2007 GayVN Award: Best Marketing Campaign

== Issues of trademark and copyright infringement ==
Lucas Entertainment, Inc., its distribution wing and Michael Lucas were named as defendants in a lawsuit filed by International Media Films, Inc. in February 2007. The suit alleges willful trademark and copyright infringement against the La Dolce Vita mark. International Media Films owns the rights to Fellini's La Dolce Vita. The suit seeks unspecified damages and to stop sales of Michael Lucas' La Dolce Vita Parts 1 & 2. In May 2007, a Manhattan federal judge rejected the request to enjoin the sales of Lucas' film, primarily on the grounds of "inexcusable delay" on the plaintiff's part. The judge noted that there were serious issues raised regarding trademark infringement or tarnishment, but also wrote that it "seems extremely unlikely that a hapless purchaser seeking to buy Fellini's film will inadvertently stumble across Michael Lucas's La Dolce Vita", which would be an important element in proving IMF's case.

Lucas won the lawsuit in April 2010 in a summary judgment by Judge John George Koeltl, who dismissed IMF's claims of copyright infringement.
