= Hand in Hand Films =

Gay pornographic film studios

Hand In Hand Films
- Industry: Gay pornography
- Founded: 1972
- Founders: Robert Alvarez, Jack Deveau, Jaap Penraat
- Defunct: 1986; 40 years ago
- Headquarters: New York, United States of America
- Products: Gay porn movies and internet

Hand in Hand Films was a New York-based gay pornographic film studio that was founded in the early 1970s, as the Golden Age of Porn took shape. The company released more than 40 titles. It became known for producing avant-garde sex films with high production values, strong narrative throughlines and scenes that often pushed the boundaries of sexuality captured on film.

Some of its most influential titles include Left-Handed (1972), Drive (1974), Catching Up (1975), and Good Hot Stuff (1975), one of the earliest documentary-style porn anthology titles that includes the only existing footage of James Bidgood's uncompleted follow-up to Pink Narcissus.

== History ==
Hand in Hand Films was established in 1972 as the East Coast's first gay film studio just as U.S. audiences in metropolitan areas had a sudden curiosity for X-rated film entertainment, driven by the commercial success of Wakefield Poole's landmark 1971 gay film Boys in the Sand and the mainstream popularity of 1972 straight film Deep Throat.

The production company was founded by film editor Robert Alvarez with industrial designer Jack Deveau and his business partner, designer/architect (and World War II Dutch resistance fighter) Jaap Penraat, with the concept of creating an alternative to West Coast gay films which had thin plotlines. The idea came together at the encouragement of Hollywood actor Sal Mineo who had taken Deveau to a production meeting for one of his films where he "sat quietly in a corner while a room full of film executives said some of the dumbest things I'd ever heard. I thought, I could do better than that."

Deveau's business and romantic partner Alvarez had his own track record in filmmaking. He assisted filmmaker Gregory Markopoulos and had an uncredited appearance in one of his films before moving on to work as an assistant editor on Woodstock (1970). While working as an editor on PBS documentary An American Family (1973) Alvarez observed the success of Boys in the Sand, which led him to encourage his partner Deveau to found a porn business. Deveau would produce and direct (and often photograph) their movies while Alvarez would edit, with Penraat taking a less visible role.

The trio decided instead of selling their film prints to exhibitors they would rent them out, promising theatre owners a steady flow of new product that would satiate their thirst for more new films to meet the demand of the growing porn ticket buyers. Hand in Hand Films also acquired films made by others to distribute, including a collection of Peter de Rome's 8mm shorts, which they blew up to 16mm and compiled in a feature-length release. This approach made them, as well as an early producer of narrative hardcore features, one of the first gay porn distribution companies.

Deveau financed the first of his company's productions, Left-Handed, a surreal porn film about Ray (Ray Frank), a hustler who seduces Bob (Robert Rikas), a straight man before he dumps him. It is notable for featuring original music by Broadway composer Stan Freeman along with original psych rock tracks by an acquaintance's band, a mix of black-and-white and color photography and a rare scene of sex between a man and woman (Rikas and Teri Reardon) in a gay production. The film premiered at the Carnegie Hall Cinema, adjacent to Carnegie Hall, earning positive reviews in Variety (a rare review of a gay film) and a number of gay publications. It also ran at New York's 55th Street Playhouse where it replaced an extended run of Boys in the Sand.

Hand In Hand's 1974 film Drive, also directed by Deveau and co-written by/starring (in drag) legendary fetish filmmaker Christopher Rage was billed as featuring a large cast of 50 men and numerous locations, signaling the ambitions of the burgeoning company to make bigger productions. Drive also featured a haunting theme song by Freeman, original music by in-house Hand in Hand composer David Earnest, inventive editing and optical printing by Alvarez, a daring fisting sequence, and nods to Marlene Dietrich through the styling of Rage's character, Arachne. Christopher Rage (credited as T. Christopher or Tray Christopher) worked with Hand in Hand in other capacities for several years, doing choreography (The Night Before), advertising, and voice over work (Hot House).

The studio went on to produce several other notable gay films in the years that followed. Good Hot Stuff (1975) is regarded by some critics as the studio's most significant title because it includes the only footage of a "lost film" called Beyond These Doors, which was supposed to be James Bidgood's follow-up to Pink Narcissus. The production was halted for unknown reasons and a segment titled "Baghdad" is presented in the pseudo-documentary. The format of Good Hot Stuff presents the footage as an upcoming movie that's in production, while the rest of the film offers sex scenes, bloopers and commentary by porn actor (and behind the scenes employee of Hand in Hand) Sydney Soons, known by the stage name Mark Woodward, who acts as host in explaining how porn films are made.

When Good Hot Stuff opened in Paris, under the title Histoires d'Hommes, it became the first gay adult film to play in France after censorship laws were loosened that year. It was such a commercial success in the country that it inspired its French distributors Norbert Terry and Jacques Scandelari to get into the business of making their own local gay productions, establishing France as the only country outside of the U.S. to have a gay film industry at the time.

Strictly Forbidden (1974), also known as Le Musee, was set in Paris and was the studio's first film shot outside the United States. It features a cameo by Jack Deveau and went unreleased until after his death in 1982. Some of the film's negatives were confiscated by the lab, so the black-and-white work print had to be used in parts. The cinematographer for Strictly Forbidden was Francois About, who went on to shoot many of the most well-known French gay adult films of the late '70s/early '80s, including Scandelari's New York City Inferno (1978), Wallace Potts' Le Beau Mec (1979), and Dietrich de Velsa's Equation to an Unknown (1980) and direct his own gay adult films in both France and New York City.

Adam & Yves (1974) was directed by Peter De Rome in collaboration with Hand in Hand, also shot in Paris. De Rome's first feature, the film includes a scene set to the recitation of the erotic poem "The Platonic Blow" (or "A Day for a Lay") by W.H. Auden and the last known footage of Greta Garbo, captured on 8mm by De Rome.

Deveau's Ballet Down the Highway (1975) is a character drama featuring strong acting by Hand in Hand regular Garry Hunt and choreographed ballet sequences, a connection to Robert Alvarez's background in ballet (through which he originally knew Wakefield Poole). The film had a large premiere with an audience including John Waters star Divine, Tennessee Williams, and Jamie Gillis.

The Destroying Angel (1976), Peter de Rome's second and final feature, was a Catholicism-infused blend of horror and adult film based loosely on Edgar Allan Poe's "William Wilson." It features frenetic editing by Alvarez, expressive photography by Deveau, and a committed performance by lead Tim Kent as Caswell Campbell, a seminarian on sabbatical who embarks upon a frightening psychedelic and erotic journey.

A Night at the Adonis (1978), written by Moose 100 and directed by Deveau, was filmed inside the now closed 1,400-seat Manhattan porn theatre The Adonis, and featured the theatre's real-life cashier Eartha Hugee in a bit role. The film, which would screen at the Adonis upon its release, was among the earliest to use a Steadicam in an opening shot that wanders through the hallways of the movie house. Its cast included popular adult star Jack Wrangler and Malo, or Arnaldo Santana, also a mainstream actor known for his roles in the Al Pacino movies Cruising and Scarface and a recurring part in the Paul Rodriguez sitcom A.k.a. Pablo. Both Wrangler and Malo appeared in additional Hand in Hand productions.

Deveau's Dune Buddies (1978) and Fire Island Fever (1979), also penned by Moose 100, screenwriter of most of the studio's later-era output, were affectionate satires of the culture and communities of Fire Island, filmed on location. Hand in Hand typically shot two features back-to-back, and this pair includes some cast overlap, with Garry Hunt, Hugh Allen (another frequent Hand in Hand performer), Pepe Brazil, Larry Paige, and Matt Harper (aka Will Seagers, one of the leads in Joe Gage's L.A. Tool & Die) performing in both films. Fire Island Fever features cameos by some notable figures in Deveau's New York City gay circle: Michael's Thing and Topman editor Frank Schmitt and Gay Morning America producers/hosts George Sardi and Johnny Savoy, all playing themselves (and Sardi performing an original musical number).

Centurians of Rome (1981), an independently filmed porno which Hand in Hand acquired under an agreement to complete post-production, was the subject of a court case surrounding how nearly $200,000 of its budget was sourced from George Bosque, who was later convicted of stealing $1.85 million from a Brink's truck. The security company's insurer Lloyd's of London filed a lawsuit in New York against Hand in Hand Films citing ownership of the movie, but the case was later dropped.

Times Square Strip (1982) was Deveau's final film, a light-hearted comedic narrative shot at and depicting the dancers at NYC's Gaiety Theatre (also with a cameo by Sardi).

Among the other directors who worked with the studio were Arch Brown and Tom DeSimone, Brown directing (1973's The Night Before) and Tom DeSimone directing (Catching Up, The Idol) as well as serving as cinematographer on several of their movies (Good Hot Stuff, Ballet Down the Highway, Wanted: Billy the Kid).

Hand in Hand had many recurring crew members (who sometimes appeared on screen) who worked with the studio before moving into the porn world or mainstream film. Their regular sound man Rolf Pardula later was the sound mixer for many independent films including George Romero's Day of the Dead, Larry Cohen's The Stuff, and several Spike Lee productions (School Daze, Malcolm X, Crooklyn, Summer of Sam, and Bamboozled). Frank Ross served as Hand in Hand's primary on set still photographer (as well as appearing in his lone acting role in Arch Brown's The Night Before), and he would go on to a career in the gay adult film world, directing, producing, helming studios, and more.

In the studio's later years, Penraat left Hand in Hand and Kees Chapman (partner of Sydney Soons) took up a significant role in the company. Hand In Hand evolved its business in the 1980s as the era of home video cassette players changed the entire model of the adult film business. Deveau died of cancer on December 2, 1982, leaving Alvarez and business associate Kees Chapman to reshape the business to serve the mail-order market. Chapman died in 1988 which is when Alvarez sold Hand in Hand's library to Bijou Video, operated by Steven Toushin, which currently owns and distributes all of the studio's titles.

== Legacy ==
Hand in Hand aimed to make films about and set within gay life and, as Soons narrates in Good Hot Stuff, to "[document] our sexuality so people in the future can see what got us off in the '70s." Their movies were part of the early era of adult film that not only helped to establish the industry but also exist as some of the earliest examples of theatrically released feature films by gay filmmakers telling explicitly gay stories.

Jack Deveau described his goals for the legacy of the studio: "Eventually this will have to become a literature... There are many stories to be told, as people finally listen to and begin to understand the experiences of gay men and women. I think there'll soon be a larger audience for movies about the way gay people feel about themselves and how they interact with the rest of society."

Alvarez elaborated upon Deveau's vision in a 2019 interview with Bijou: "[Jack] said that these films were like literature and that if we kept them - you know, rather than sell them - we would end up eventually having them seen over and over and over again and be a representation of what it was like in the days that we shot them... Because most of them were contemporary stories of people at that time." Alvarez also described this to Manshots in a 1982 interview: "One of the things that Jack always said was that 'no matter what - this is recorded literature, or a piece of literature. You can be sure when you're dead that that piece of literature will be around.' As long as the film negative doesn't deteriorate or the lab doesn't burn down, it's true. Whatever is there that he made is going to be there for a long time. Who knows what people will make of it - but it will be there."

Footage from Hand in Hand releases and interviews with Robert Alvarez touching on the studio's history are featured throughout the documentary Gay Sex in the 70s (2005) and Hand in Hand's work with Peter de Rome heavily features in Ethan Reid's Peter de Rome: Grandfather of Gay Porn (2014).

In 2019, Marco Siedelmann released the book Good Hot Stuff: The Life and Times of Gay Film Pioneer Jack Deveau, chronicling Hand in Hand's history with extensive interviews, behind the scenes photos, and vintage press materials.

== Filmography ==
=== Hand in Hand productions ===
- Left-Handed (1972)
- The Erotic Films of Peter de Rome (1972)
- The Night Before (1973)
- Drive (1974)
- Adam & Yves (1974)
- Strictly Forbidden (Le Musee) (1974)
- Good Hot Stuff (Histoires D'Hommes) (1975)
- Ballet Down the Highway (1975)
- Wanted: Billy the Kid (1976)
- Star Trick (1976)
- The Destroying Angel (1976)
- Hot Truckin' (1977)
- Sex Magic (1977)
- Hot House (1977)
- Rough Trades (1977)
- Private Collection (1978)
- A Night at the Adonis (1978)
- Dune Buddies (1978)
- Fire Island Fever (1979)
- Just Blonds (1979)
- The Idol (1979)
- The Boys from Riverside Drive (1981)
- Times Square Strip (1982)
- In Heat (1985)

=== Distributed by Hand in Hand (partial) ===
- Casey (1971)
- The American Adventures of Surelick Holmes (1971)
- American Cream (1972)
- Bob & Daryl & Ted & Alex (1972)
- Jack (1973)
- The Back Row (1973)
- Station to Station (1974)
- Anything Goes (1974)
- Him (1974)
- Spread Eagles (early '70s)
- Boynapped (1975)
- Demigods (1975)
- Check and Checkmate (1975)
- The Illusion (1975)
- Pygmalion (1975)
- Mâles hard corps (1977)
- Gettin' Down (1979)
- Centurians of Rome (1981)
