= Maureen Irwin =

Lesbian activist from Windsor, Ontario

- Born: October 7, 1934; Windsor, Ontario, Canada
- Died: July 30, 2002 (aged 67); Calgary, Alberta, Canada
- Spouse: James Ronald Warren (m. 1956; div. 1984)
- Partner: Sheryl McInnes (ca. 1990– )

Maureen Estella Ruth Irwin (October 7, 1934 – July 30, 2002) was a lesbian activist in Edmonton, Alberta who advocated for Edmonton's 2SLGBTQ+ community. Irwin was actively involved with many organizations throughout her life including the Girl Guides of Canada, the Gay and Lesbian Alliance (GALA), Womonspace, Common Woman Books, the Canadian Diabetes Association, the Edmonton Board of Health, and the Edmonton chapter of the Multiple Sclerosis Society.

== Life and career ==
Maureen Irwin was born on October 7, 1934, in Windsor, Ontario, to Estella and William Irwin. She joined the Royal Canadian Air Force in 1953 and was stationed near Montreal. Irwin met James Ronald Warren in 1955, marrying soon after in 1956. The pair welcomed two daughters and two sons before moving to CFB Cold Lake, Alberta in 1965. Irwin was active in the community there, including holding various leadership positions in the local Girl Guides chapter.

In 1974, the family moved to Edmonton where Maureen was employed by the Edmonton Journal as a librarian until 1982. Irwin separated from her husband in 1978, coming out as a lesbian in 1981. Their divorce was finalized in 1984.

After leaving the Edmonton Journal, Irwin began working at the Boyle Street Co-op, now known as Boyle Street Community Services, finding housing for Edmonton's inner city residents. In 1986, Irwin was diagnosed with multiple sclerosis, a disease she dealt with in addition to a prior diagnosis of diabetes.

In the early 1990s, Irwin met Sheryl McInnes at a friend's party and fell in love. The two shared their lives together until McInnes died unexpectedly from a heart attack on October 5, 1998. After McInnes' death, Irwin moved to Calgary, Alberta to live closer to her grandchildren and two sons.

== Volunteering and activism ==
After moving to Edmonton and working at the Boyle Street Co-op, now known as Boyle Street Community Services, Irwin became a social activist in 1982. The Pisces Bathhouse Raid, a 1981 police raid on a gay bathhouse frequented by the Edmonton's gay community, motivated Irwin to become a "gay and lesbian activist". Irwin's efforts to support the 2SLGBTQ+ community in Edmonton included donating to the Privacy Defense Fund, in support of those arrested following the Pisces Bathhouse Raid, actively participating in the Edmonton chapter of the Gay Alliance Towards Equality (GATE) as well as its successor organization, Gay and Lesbian Awareness (GALA). As a part of GALA, Irwin actively advocated for the Alberta government to include sexual orientation in its Individual Rights Protection Act, now the Alberta Human Rights Act, for over a decade. GALA also organized various Edmonton Pride activities. In 1991, Irwin worked together with Michael Phair and others as part of their GALA duties to host the first Pride parade in Edmonton. The parade began at McIntyre Park, near Whyte Avenue and was attended by less than 30 people.

Around the same time that Irwin was involved with GATE, she also joined Common Woman Books, a feminist bookstore in Edmonton, and played a role in the creation of Womonspace, a recreational and social group for lesbians. Irwin was an active member of Womonspace and went on to become the membership coordinator of the organization in 1993.

When Michael Phair ran for Edmonton City Councillor in 1992, Irwin volunteered as his campaign office manager. Following Phair's win, Irwin stayed on for a few months to run Phair's City Hall office. In 1995, Phair ran for a second term in office with Irwin running his campaign once more, promoting Phair's bid for reelection as "a way to silence the critics".

In the 1990s, Irwin and her partner, Sheryl McInnes, challenged the heteronormativity of greeting cards by stocking "lesbian and feminist cards" at their mail-order bookstore, Woman to Womon Books. Irwin and McInnes also spoke at a 1996 meeting in Edmonton, dubbed 'Alberta Through the Eyes of Women', to leverage Canada's signature on the Beijing Declaration to improve the lives of women in Alberta.

Throughout her life, Irwin also spent time volunteering for the Canadian Diabetes Association, the Edmonton Board of Health, and the Edmonton chapter of the Multiple Sclerosis Society.

== Awards ==
In an interview for Womonspace News, Irwin noted that she felt the most meaningful award she received in her life was the Silver Thank You Badge from the Girl Guides of Canada as "it can only be given by people you work with in Guides". Irwin received both the Silver Thank You Badge and an Award of Merit from the CFB Cold Lake's Community Council for her volunteer work in 1974.

In 1993, Irwin was recognized for her 27 years of volunteer service with the Canada Volunteer Award Medal and Certificate of Honour. Edmonton's first openly gay city councillor, Michael Phair, was one of the people to nominate Irwin for the award. She was also nominated for the YWCA Tribute to Women Award (Public Affairs and Communications) for her work with the gay community in Edmonton.

At the 1993 Gay and Lesbian Pride event in Edmonton, the Maureen Irwin Pride Award was created in honour of Irwin's contributions to the community. Patricia Warren, Irwin's daughter, presented her mother with the inaugural Maureen Irwin Award for Community Service.

== Death and legacy ==
On July 30, 2002, Maureen Irwin in died in Calgary, Alberta after a battle with abdominal cancer. She left behind her children, grandchildren, and friends.
