= Wrangler: Anatomy of an Icon =

- Theatrical release poster
- Directed by: Jeffrey Schwarz
- Produced by: Jeffrey Schwarz; Sonja Nelson
- Starring: Jack Wrangler
- Edited by: Jaime Meyers Schlenck
- Music by: Michael "The Millionaire" Cudahy
- Production company: Automat Pictures
- Distributed by: TLA Releasing
- Release date: June 7, 2008 (Newfest New York LGBT Film Festival)
- Running time: 82 minutes
- Country: United States
- Language: English

Wrangler: Anatomy of an Icon is a 2008 American documentary film about the life of Jack Wrangler, produced and directed by Jeffrey Schwarz of Automat Pictures. It had its premiere at the 2008 New York Lesbian, Gay, Bisexual, & Transgender Film Festival (Newfest) and is distributed by TLA Releasing.

The documentary chronicles the life of Jack Wrangler, the professional name of John Robert Stillman in his role as a gay porn star who rapidly became one of the first performers in gay pornography to achieve star status and a cult following. The documentary also features his transitioning to roles such as straight porn star, his romantic relationship with and later marriage to singer Margaret Whiting, his activism in supporting and promoting AIDS charities and his later career as a theatrical producer and director.

== Appearances ==
- Jack Wrangler
- Margaret Whiting - Songbird
- Joe Gage - Director, Kansas City Trucking Co.
- Bruce Vilanch - Actor & author
- Chi Chi LaRue - Gay adult film director
- Robert Alvarez - Cofounder, Hand in Hand Films
- Brooks Ashmanskas - Friend / costar in Dream
- Michael Bronski - Author & historian
- Spring Byington - Actress
- Gino Colbert - Adult actor & director / Asst. to Chuck Vincent
- Durk Dehner - Tom of Finland Foundation
- Samuel Delaney - Author
- Michael Denneny - Friend and Christopher Street editor
- Jack Deveau - Cofounder, Hand in Hand Films, director of A Night at the Adonis
- Andy Devine - Actor
- Casey Donovan - Actor
- Jerry Douglas - Gay adult film director
- Kevin Duda - Actor / costar in Dream

== Reception ==
The documentary won a GayVNAward in 2009 for Best Alternative Release. Wrangler died on April 7, 2009, at the age of 62 due to emphysema.

== See also ==
- List of gay porn stars
