= George Payne (actor) =

American actor and retired pornographic film actor

- Born: February 7, 1944 (age 82); Ohio, United States
- Other names: George Bell, John Lance, George Payne, George Anderson, George Paine, Mike Payne
- Height: 5 ft 8 in (1.73 m)
- Spouse: Diane
- Awards: XRCO Hall of Fame (1999)

George Payne (born February 7, 1944) is an American actor and retired pornographic film actor. He found early success as a swimsuit model and was featured in Physique Pictorial. Payne began work in the adult film industry in The Back Row in 1973 opposite actor Casey Donovan. He was featured on the cover of the LGBT magazine The Advocate the same year. He later starred with Jack Wrangler in Navy Blue in 1979, and in Centurians of Rome in 1981. Payne later transitioned to straight roles in the adult industry; his work is considered part of the Golden Age of Porn. He was inducted into the X-Rated Critics Organization Hall of Fame in 1999.

== Early life and education ==
Payne was born on February 7, 1944, in Ohio and moved to Palm Springs, California, for schooling. He grew up in a steel mill town in Ohio. His family has roots in Yugoslavia and Croatia. His father originally came from Tunisia prior to immigrating to the United States. He served in the United States Air Force and subsequently studied in university after discharge from the U.S. military.

== Career ==
Payne moved to New York to work on a career in male swimsuit modeling. During the mid-1960s, Payne was featured as a male model in magazines including Physique Pictorial. Payne entered the porn industry in 1973 with the gay movie The Back Row by Jerry Douglas. He starred opposite Casey Donovan, as a newcomer to New York from Montana exploring the gay sexual society of the locale. There was no spoken dialogue in the film; Payne and Donovan had to interact through gestures and choreographed interactions to display their emotions. He initially marketed himself towards a gay audience. He was featured on the cover of the LGBT magazine The Advocate in 1973. Payne had an acting role in the 1974 film Death Wish starring Charles Bronson. He starred in the 1976 film Kiss Today Goodbye directed by Francis Ellie alongside Peter Zass, as a blue-collar contractor who has a relationship with a staid man working in finance. Payne starred opposite actor Jack Wrangler in the 1979 film Navy Blue. He also starred in the infamous Centurians of Rome in 1981. He played the character of Demetrius in the film, in a production compared to a photo shoot for Physique Pictorial. Regarding his work on Centurians of Rome and during this period of his career, Metro Weekly called Payne a "70s gay porn icon". Payne's work in the 1982 film Corruption was selected as part of the Anthology Film Archive collection Porn Noir. His acting work took place within the Golden Age of Porn. Payne was interviewed by The Rialto Report as part of its documentation of the golden age of the adult film industry; Payne was regarded as among "some of the industry's biggest and most influential names of the era".

He transitioned over to the straight side of the industry eventually, along with colleagues Casey Donovan and Jack Wranger. Payne gained notoriety for his intense portrayal of psychopaths in several Avon BDSM "roughie" films. Barbara Nitke recalled Payne was known in the industry for his skill at improvisation during filming, "George was famous for his ad-libbing." He retired from hardcore porn in 1988, at which point he had starred in more than 180 films in the industry. Writing in The Advocate in 1988, journalist Susie Bright placed Payne's work among the "megastars of gay erotica", including Casey Donovan and Scott Taylor. He continued making appearances in non-sexual BDSM roles until 1997 before leaving the industry entirely. Payne was inducted into the X-Rated Critics Organization Hall of Fame in 1999. In 2019, he made his mainstream acting debut in director Nicolas Winding Refn's television series Too Old to Die Young.

== Personal life ==
Payne dated actress Vanessa del Rio when they starred in films together briefly in 1976. Payne became acquainted with a woman only known as “Diane” in the 1990s during a period where she was employed in mainstream cinema working as a casting agent. They subsequently married and resided together in Queens, New York, before moving to Florida in 2015.

== Awards and nominations ==
| Year | Ceremony | Category | Work | Result | Notes |
|---|---|---|---|---|---|
| 1985 | XRCO Award | Best Supporting Performance, Male | Viva Vanessa | Nominated | |
| 1985 | XRCO Award | Male Performer of the Year | First Time at Cherry High, Viva Vanessa, Sex Spa U.S.A. | Nominated | |
| 1985 | XRCO Award | Best Copulation Scene | First Time at Cherry High (shared with Tanya Lawson) | Nominated | |
| 1985 | XRCO Award | Best Kinky Scene | Viva Vanessa (shared with Vanessa del Rio, Renee Summers) | Nominated | |
| 1999 | XRCO Award | XRCO Hall of Fame | Body of work, inducted | Won | |

== See also ==
- LGBT culture in New York City
- List of male performers in gay porn films
- List of members of the XRCO Hall of Fame
- The Satisfiers of Alpha Blue
- The Tale of Tiffany Lust
