= Edmonton Pride =

Annual LGBT event in Edmonton, Alberta

Edmonton Pride Festival
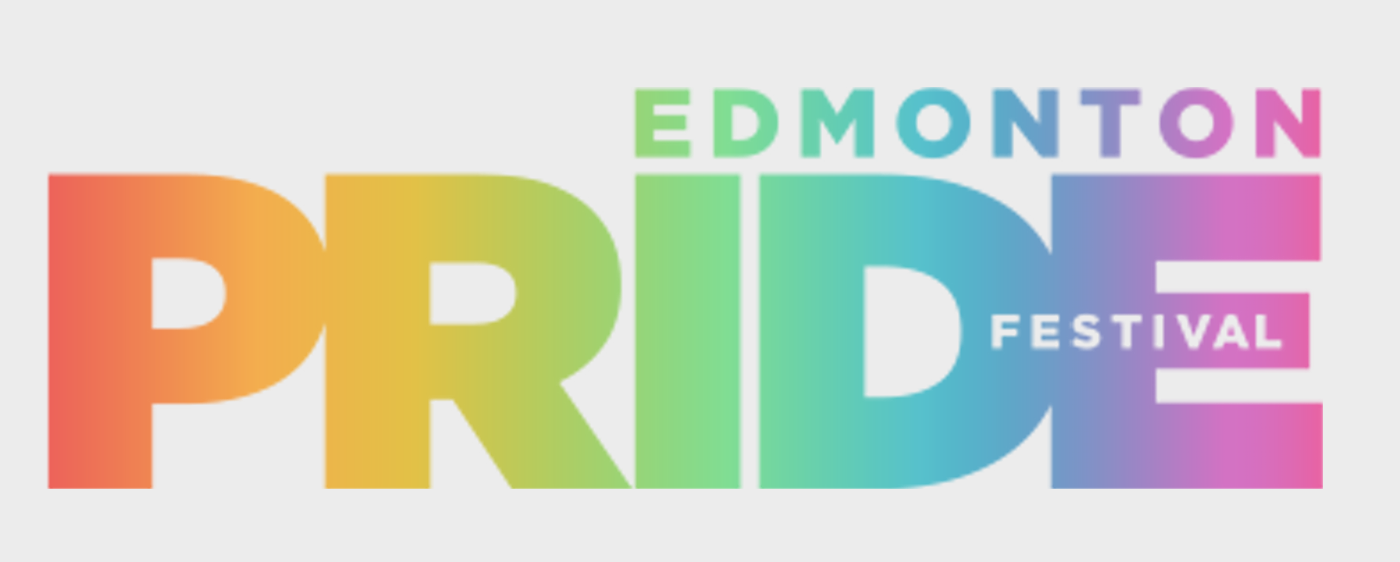
- Logo of the Edmonton Pride Festival c. 2022
- Type: pride festival
- Location: Edmonton
- Website: edmontonpridefest.com

The Edmonton Pride Festival is a 2SLGBTQ+ pride festival, held annually in Edmonton, Alberta, Canada.

The event has its roots in the protest movement against a police raid on the Pisces Spa, a gay bathhouse, on May 31, 1981.

== History ==
=== Origins, 1980–1983 ===
The first Pride celebration in Edmonton was a small picnic and campfire held in 1980 at Camp Harris and was attended by about 75 participants. In 1981, following the police raid at the Pisces Spa, a small group of queer Edmontonians participated in the Klondike Days Sourdough Raft Race with a raft by the name of S.S. Pisces.

1982 was Edmonton's first "Gay Pride Weekend" that took place from June 25–27. The theme of the weekend was "Pride Through Unity" and events were organized by seven local gay and lesbians groups. The weekend started with a drag show at local gay bar Flashback, sponsored by the Imperial Sovereign Court of the Wild Rose, and later a Unity Dance at Phoenix Hall hosted by G.A.T.E. Edmonton that was attended by about 250 people.

The first week long Gay and Lesbian Pride Week was held in 1983 and ran from June 25-July 3. Events of that week included a Lesbian book fair at Common Woman Books, an Art Appreciation night held at Flashback, multiple film nights, and a dance at Phoenix Hall.

=== GALA era, 1984–1989 ===
In 1984 Gay Pride Week turned into Gay and Lesbian Awareness (GALA), which was a combination of community groups G.A.T.E, Metropolitan Community Church (MCC), Edmonton Vocal Minority Chorus (EVM), and Womonspace. That year, the GALA '84 committee petitioned the City of Edmonton to declare June 27 as Gay and Lesbian Awareness Day, but it was rejected by Mayor Laurence Decore, with several alderman, including Julian Kinisky and Lyall Roper, speaking against the idea.

GALA once again hosted Pride Week in 1985 with the years events including a jazz concert, a G.A.T.E. dance, a picnic in Rundle Park, and a wine and cheese event put on by Womonspace. Another request was submitted by Alderman Ed Ewasiuk for the city to declare a Gay and Lesbian Awareness Day but it was rejected "amid the giggling of some council members."

GALA '86 included another week full of events including an art show in the AIDS Network foyer, a dance, a picnic, an information seminar on safer sex, as well as a public forum on “homosexuality and the family”, held at the University of Alberta. 1986 was also the first year that the schedule of events was published in the Edmonton Journal. The Edmonton Journal continued to publish the events of GALA week in 1987. This included the popular Womonspace wine and cheese event, the return of the annual dance and picnic, and three plays: “Come Out, Come Out, Wherever You Are”, “Retrospective: A Dramatization of Our Gay and Lesbian History,” and “Fit for Life: An Evening of Skits”. GALA '88 saw the return of the Womonspace wine and cheese event and the GALA dance and picnic and new Pride events included a coffee house performance at the Unitarian Church. There was also a croquet game between The Northern Chaps, Edmonton's Leather and Levi Club, and Guys in Disguise.

GALA '89 ran from June 16–27, 1989 with the theme “Celebrate Our Differences.” The Pride Festival opened with a special concert by Lynn Lavner and David Sedera, held at the Provincial Museum. The event was emceed by newly elected MP Svend Robinson from British Columbia. Robinson was also there to help celebrate the grand opening of the new Gay and Lesbian Community Centre (GLCCE) building located at 9917 112th Street. Once again, Mayor Terry Cavanagh and City Council rejected GALA's Pride proclamation request. Alderman Julian Kinisky even threatened to "run off to Australia where men were still men if Edmonton proclaimed a gay day" stating that if a special day for gays and lesbians was declared that "the next thing you know homosexuality will be mandatory." In response to the rejection of the proclamation, GALA decided to self-proclaim “Gay Day Anyway”, punctuated with a public rally and mock proclamation in the form of a special “silly city council meeting” held at Centennial Plaza with local actors playing the roles of city aldermen and the mayor.

=== 1990–1998 ===
Pride '90 ran from June 15–27, 1990 and was special because newly elected Mayor Jan Reimer became the first Mayor in Edmonton's history to participate in Pride festival activities, including a celebrity dunk tank event held as part of the “Something Wicked, Something Wild” party at the Northern Light Theatre. All proceeds from the event supported the Ross Armstrong Memorial Fund/Names Project Quilt. The theme of the festival for 1990 was "Does your mother know?" and featured events such as a workshop for parents, information sessions and public forums about safe sex and testing, and a pride picnic at Rundle Park. An information session was also held at Centennial Plaza and was attended by gay Alderman Glen Murray from Winnipeg who spoke the need for human rights protections around sexual orientation in Alberta.

Unlike many pride parades which are held at the end of their associated festival week, Edmonton Pride hosted its parade near the opening of the event. However, unlike Pride Week in Toronto, which also had its roots in police protests against Operation Soap, the parade did not become a regular feature of the event until the early 1990s.

1991 saw the first official pride march, which was led by Michael Phair and Maureen Irwin down Whyte Avenue. One of the events that year was a bike-a-thon which raised money for the Delwin Vriend Defense Fund. Delwin had been fired earlier that year from King's University and was fighting his unjust dismissal, which would ultimately end up before the Supreme Court of Canada (Vriend v. Alberta).

The theme for Pride in 1992 was “Pink, Pride, Power” and ran from June 18–27. A pride-a-thon was held on the 27th, once again raising money for the Delwin Vriend Defense Fund and a three-night film festival at Garneau Theatre. This year, despite objections of Alderman Ken Kozak, who said proclaiming a Gay Pride Day would be akin to “having a day for flying elephants,” City Council gave its approval for the Mayor Jan Reimer to proclaim gay and lesbian awareness day. However, Reimer was away on vacation and the acting Deputy Mayor Alderman Sheila McKay refused to sign the proclamation.

Logo of the former Pride society

=== Edmonton Pride Festival Society era, 1999–2018 ===
From 1999 to 2018, the event was organized by the Edmonton Pride Festival Society, a non-profit organization, and was often held in early June each year. As well, the Edmonton Pride Festival Society frequently chose to designate community groups, rather than individuals, as the grand marshals of its parade; in 2012, the parade was led by the trustees of the Edmonton Public School Board, and in 2013 the event was led by the Pride Centre of Edmonton, the city's main LGBTQ2S+ community centre.

The 2013 festival was opened with the raising of the rainbow flag at CFB Edmonton on June 7, the first time in Canadian history that the flag was flown at a military base. The parade on June 8 followed 102 Avenue between 107 Street and Churchill Square. An estimated 30,000 spectators turned out for the event. Performers at the parade event included singer-songwriters Rae Spoon, Jeffery Straker and Kim Kuzma.

As of 2017, the Edmonton Pride Parade had 50,000 attendees.

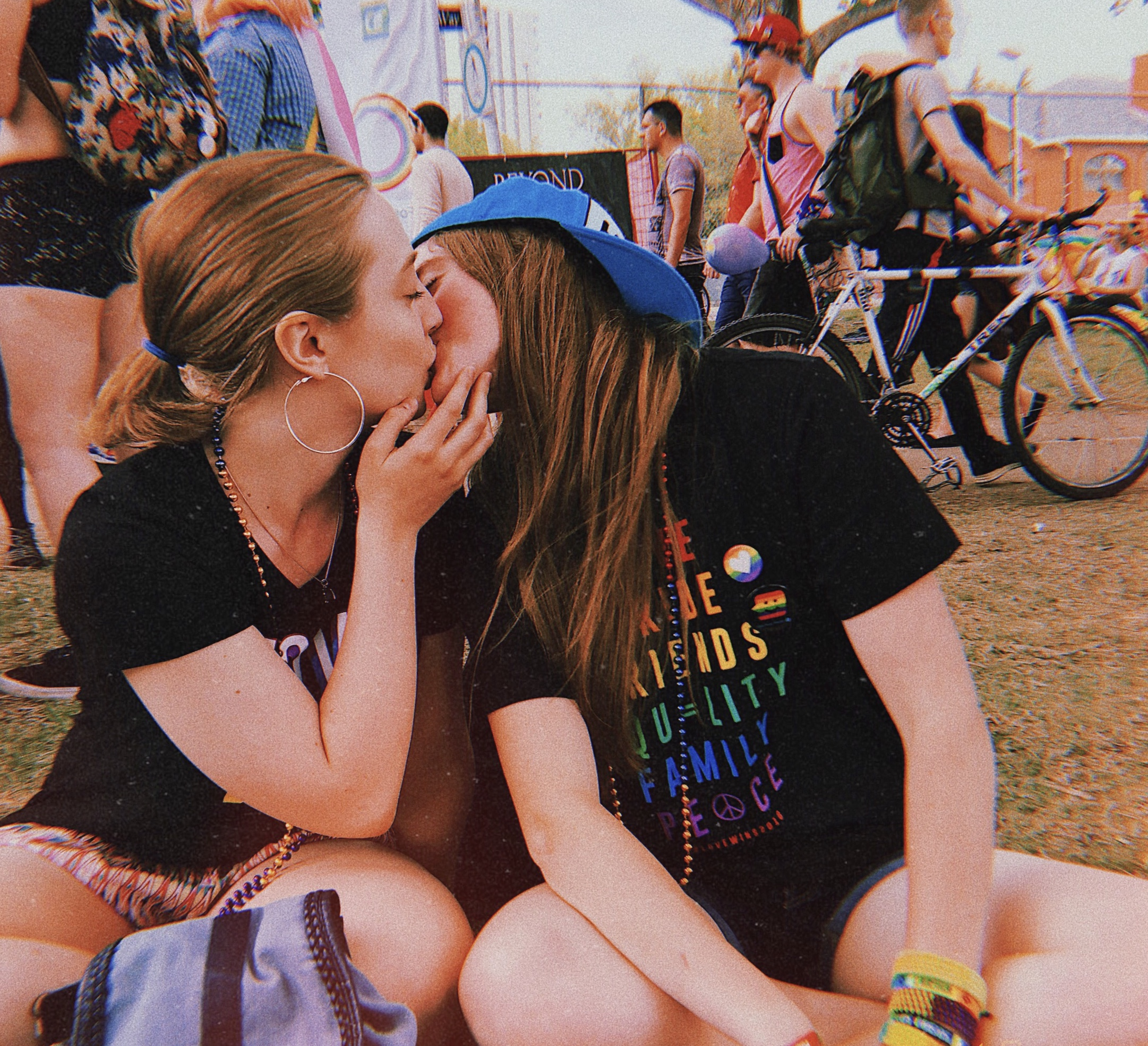
Two women kiss in Strathcona Park, during the annual 2018 Edmonton Pride Festival.

On June 9, 2018, a group of queer and trans Black, Indigenous, and people of colour from within the community temporarily stopped the parade, demanding law enforcement and military members be dis-invited from the parade and future parades. The protesters called for this demand due to community members feeling unsafe in the presence of police as well as Pride originally being a "protest against police oppression". After a period of negotiation between the parade organizers and protest organizers, parade organizers agreed to the requests of the protest and issued a statement that it "agreed with the demands, and that police and military members would not march in the parade until the community feels that they have taken the necessary steps for all community members to feel safe with their presence."

=== Cancellation and pandemic, 2019–2021 ===
In March 2019, Shades of Colour (SOC), an Indigenous, Black, and people of colour-centred 2SLGBTQ+ community group and RaricaNow, an 2SLGBTQ+ refugee advocacy group, submitted demands to the Edmonton Pride Festival Society (EPFS) following the protests of the 2018 Pride Festival. Four representatives of SOC and RaricaNow were invited to an EPFS board meeting on April 4, 2019, to discuss their demands. Approximately 30 supporters showed up to the meeting, causing tension with the Board. An EPFS member called the police on the basis that "members of the board felt unsafe" however SOC and RaricaNow felt the that EPFS calling the police was "a moment of pure irony" given that they were there to discuss the "history and relationship between police and Edmonton's LGBTQ community". The board meeting was then moved to a separate location, without SOC or RaricaNow representatives present.

Although it is unclear how much of a role the events of April 4 played in the decision, the Edmonton Pride Festival was cancelled on April 10, 2019. The EPFS Board of Directors announced that following the results of their vote, the 2019 Edmonton Pride Festival would not go as planned. EPFS cited the "current political and social environment" would prevent them from hosting an enjoyable and safe festival. Additional factors cited include a lack of funding and volunteers, as well as not fulfilling the mission to unify the community. SOC hosted its own Pride events in 2019 in the wake of the cancelled festival. Such events included a sober dance party and an informal discussion with Vivek Shraya, a trans artist and author. The Edmonton Pride Parade would remain cancelled indefinitely.

Official festivities were cancelled again in 2020 due to the COVID-19 pandemic.

With pandemic restrictions still in place in 2021, Pride activities moved online with the help of local organization, Fruit Loop, who created an augmented reality pride tour. The Augmented reality pride tour included over 50 performers and speakers and featured ten locations around Edmonton.

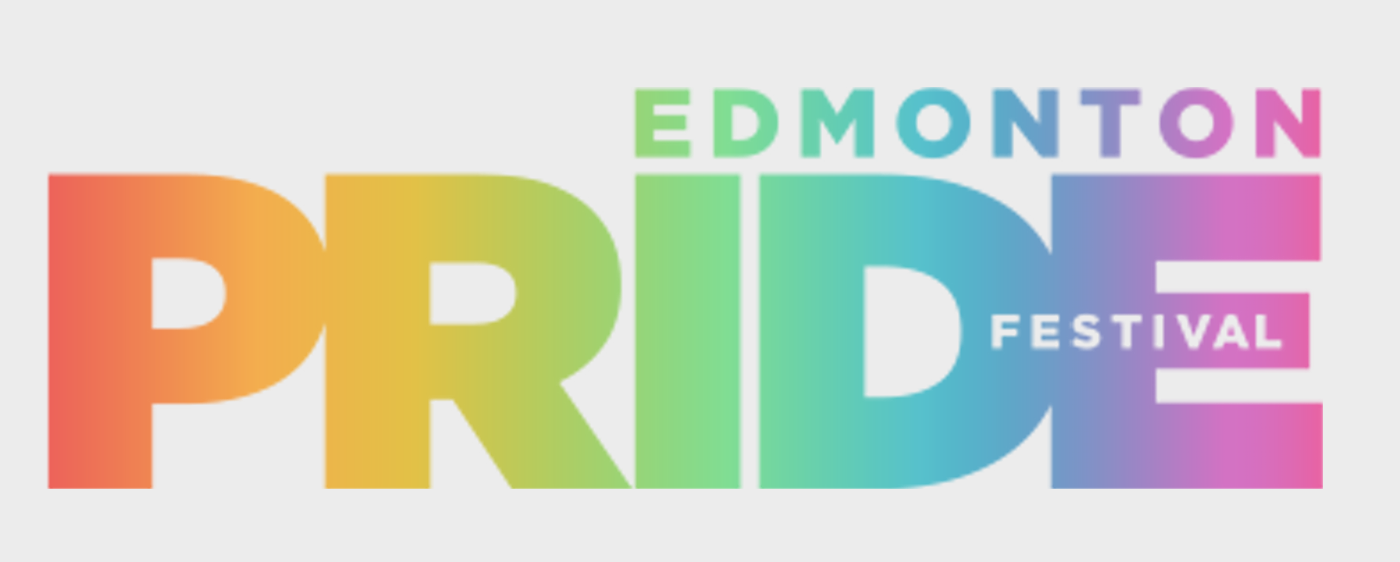
Edmonton Pride Festival logo 2022 -

=== Edmonton PrideFest Association era, 2022– ===
In 2022, Edmonton Pride returned to Churchill Square under the new organization of Edmonton PrideFest Association. The four-year break was due to the COVID-19 pandemic and the additional contributing factors. The Summer of Pride, in 2023, saw the main festival move to August, with over 80 Pride events preceding it throughout the summer. In 2025, the Edmonton Pride Parade was revived for the first time since 2018.

In August 2026, the organization announced that Edmonton Police Service resources would be present for its parade, citing security concerns in the wake of incidents such as the Berlin Pride attack on July 25. EPS stated that its deployment would focus primarily on traffic management and emergency preparedness, while organizers stated that "the increased security presence does not signal a policy position, endorsement or support. It is part of the required public safety planning for a large public gathering." The announcement faced criticism from other LGBTQ organizations, with a number announcing their intent to boycott the parade due to EPS presence.
