= Michael Hardwick (disambiguation) =

Michael Hardwick (1924–1991) was a British writer.

Michael Hardwick may also refer to:

- Michael Hardwick, American actor known for his role in Adam & Yves
- Michael Hardwick, the respondent in the United States Supreme Court case of Bowers v. Hardwick
