= Edmonton Queer History Project =

History research project in Edmonton, Alberta

Edmonton Queer History Project (EQHP)
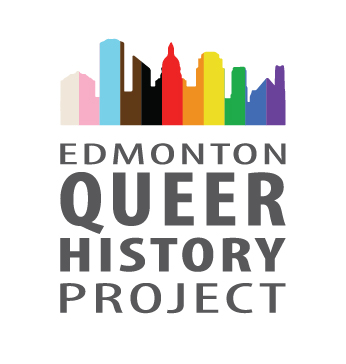
- Commercial?: No
- Type of project: Community-engaged research
- Location: Edmonton, Alberta, Canada
- Established: 2015
- Website: edmontonqueerhistoryproject.ca

The Edmonton Queer History Project (EQHP) is a community-engaged research project focused on documenting, preserving, and making visible the history of Edmonton's 2SLGBTQ+ community. One of EQHP's most prominent initiatives is a map of 27 locations around Downtown Edmonton, each with historical significance to the local 2SLGBTQ+ community, that was initially launched in March 2022. The Project also launched an interactive website, two podcasts (From Here to Queer and Vriend Versus Alberta), and regularly hosts walking tours following the EQHP downtown map to promote the city's queer history that is often absent in school curriculum and left out of public conversation.

== History ==
The Edmonton Queer History Project, then known as the Queer History Project, began in 2015 as an interactive multi-media art exhibit to celebrate the 35th anniversary of the Edmonton Pride Festival. Dr. Kristopher Wells organized the project with funding support from the Edmonton Community Foundation and Dr. Michelle Lavoie curated an exhibit, called We Are Here: Queer History Project, detailing decades of Edmonton's 2SLGBTQ+ community member stories at the Art Gallery of Alberta, which ran from 5 June until 21 June 2015. Open calls for contributions of personal memorabilia and stories for the exhibit went out in January, 2015, to ensure individual experiences were centred. Additionally, recording equipment was available for community members to add their stories to the project during the exhibit's run. The exhibit featured 21 interviews recorded with community leaders like Michael Phair as well as posters, photographs, and other ephemera. After its run at the Art Gallery of Alberta, We Are Here: Queer History Project became a travelling exhibition, visiting small towns in rural Alberta.

== Current work ==
Following We Are Here: Queer History Project, the Project's members collated their research efforts into more accessible formats. In March 2022, EQHP launched a new website including a historical timeline of Edmonton's Pride Festival, a podcast called From Here to Queer, walking tours, and a map with 27 locations of historical significance to the local 2SLGBTQ+ community. Free physical copies of the map were made available at the Edmonton International Airport and various Edmonton Public Library locations.

Dr. Kristopher Wells, Canada Research Chair and associate professor at MacEwan University, leads the project's research activities from MacEwan University's Centre for Sexual and Gender Diversity. Original members of the EQHP team include Dr. Kristopher Wells, Dr. Michelle Lavoie, Darrin Hagen, Michael Phair, Rob Browatzke, Kyler Chittick, Japkaran Saroya, and Paige Simpson.

After a successful launch of the downtown map, EQHP was approached by the Old Strathcona Business Association to research queer history landmarks on the south side of the city like the Pride Corner of Whyte Avenue. EQHP's work continues with the introduction of a community map tagging project, #EQHPStories, and a new podcast, produced in partnership with the Edmonton Community Foundation, entitled Vriend Versus Alberta, marking the 25th anniversary of Vriend v Alberta. Launched in 2023, #EQHPStories is an interactive map of Edmonton which community members are able to add pins to locations across the city and add their own stories. A collection of various local 2SLGBTQ+ magazines, newsletters, and other items is also being digitized and hosted on the Internet Archive for EQHP in collaboration with the MacEwan University Library and University of Alberta Library.

=== Guided tours ===
With support from the Edmonton Downtown Business Association, EQHP hosts free guided walking tours, as well as bus tours, that explore local queer history. The interactive 90-minute tours are intended for small groups to promote interaction and conversation amongst participants. Members of the EQHP team, such as Michael Phair and Darrin Hagen, lead the walking tours.

=== Podcasts ===
The original EQHP podcast, From Here to Queer, is hosted by local playwright and queer historian, Darrin Hagen. Exploring the people, places, and moments important to Edmonton's queer history, the podcast features guests like Edmonton's first openly gay city councillor, Michael Phair, Judge Julie Lloyd, and Alison Redford, the first female Premier of Alberta.

Vriend Versus Alberta is the newest podcast from EQHP, produced in collaboration with the Edmonton Community Foundation, as a limited 10-part series. Also hosted by Darrin Hagen, Vriend Versus Alberta commemorates the 25th anniversary of landmark legal case for 2SLGBTQ+ rights in Canada, Vriend v Alberta.

== Awards ==
In September 2022, the Edmonton Queer History Project was shortlisted for the Governor General's History Award for Excellence in Community Programming. This award is one of multiple Governor General's Awards, recognizing organizations that "represent remarkable and inspiring initiatives that encourage public engagement in Canadian history."
