= Trouser Bar =

- Directed by: Kristen Bjorn
- Story by: John Gielgud (screenplay)
- Produced by: David McGillivray
- Starring: Denholm Spurr, Craig Daniel, Zac Renfree, Ashley Ryder, Scott Hunter, Hans Berlin
- Cinematography: Sam Hardy
- Edited by: Esteban Requejo
- Music by: Stephen Thrower (theme music)
- Release date: 20 March 2016 (BFI Flare London LGBTQ+ Film Festival)
- Running time: 20 minutes
- Country: United Kingdom
- Language: English

Trouser Bar is a 2016 British silent erotic comedy/fantasy film directed by Kristen Bjorn (born: Robert Russell), photographed by Sam Hardy, and edited by Esteban Requejo. The executive producer and driving force behind Trouser Bar is British screenwriter, playwright and producer David McGillivray, who famously collaborated with directors including Pete Walker and Norman J. Warren.

There has been much controversy over the authorship of "Trouser Bar"; accord to McGillivray, the, "Authorship of the [Trouser Bar] screenplay has not been unequivocally established. The authorship of the script of this film is unattributed. The producers of the film firmly discourage any speculation as to authorship. Pathetique Films can confirm that the script was passed on to them by the late Peter de Rome."

Focusing on a single "situation" in a menswear boutique in 1976, the short film has been described as an “erotic fantasy" in the style of a 1970s British sex comedy and does not include hardcore sex scenes. It features British comedians Barry Cryer and Julian Clary in cameo roles, along with actor Nigel Havers and London-based entertainer, Miss Hope Springs.

The production was first reported by Ben Beaumont-Thomas in an article in The Guardian newspaper on 26 November 2014, with David McGillivray quoted as saying "Nobody knows anything about this script. [The author]’s only screenplay. So next year, we are going to make... Trouser Bar. [The author] was obsessed with trousers, loved corduroy and leather. And so he wrote a film set in a menswear shop."

== Cast ==
- Denholm Spurr as Bobby
- Craig Daniel as Joe
- Zac Renfree as Larry
- Ashley Ryder as David
- Scott Hunter
- Hans Berlin
- Barry Cryer as himself
- Julian Clary as himself
- Nigel Havers as himself
- Miss Hope Springs as herself

== Production ==
Trouser Bar stars Denholm Spurr (Bobby), Craig Daniel (Joe), Zac Renfree (Larry), Ashley Ryder (David), Scott Hunter and Hans Berlin.

Five days of filming took place in September 2015 on a specially-constructed set in a converted TV repair shop on the Caledonian Road close to King's Cross station in London. Production Design was by Lorna Gay Copp and Art Direction by Alan Gilchrist. The distinctive period costumes and clothing, notably corduroy, were sourced and supervised by Mark Harriott. The original score by Stephen Thrower combines disco-style music appropriate to the period with a 70's "porn film vibe".

The location shoot was covered by The Londonist.

== Music ==
McGillivray had previously announced that a limited edition collector's vinyl LP (long-playing) record of Stephen Thrower's soundtrack for Trouser Bar would be released along with other cues. The record is being released on the Abstract Raven label. The special edition was described on the film's Facebook page as "the sexy package you'll want to fondle." It includes a green vinyl LP "lovingly wrapped in haute couture corduroy complete with lavishly illustrated insert, paisley hankie, badge and Peter de Rome's visiting card." The album launch, presented on 23 October 2017 in Fitzrovia, was attended by composer Stephen Thrower, producer McGillivray and stars of Trouser Bar.

== Release ==
Shown as an unattributed work, Trouser Bar received its world premiere on Sunday 20 March 2016 at the 30th BFI Flare: London LGBT Film Festival (formerly London Lesbian & Gay Film Festival) in the prestigious NFT1 cinema at BFI Southbank. The screening, introduced by the BFI's Brian Robinson and also including Peter de Rome's short film Encounter, featured numerous double entendres and an extended Q&A with members of the Trouser Bar cast and crew. The audience response was extremely enthusiastic. The BFI had described the film as "a controversial slice of gay erotica" and commented "The script for the film was found in the collection of the late erotic filmmaker Peter de Rome, who made some of the most beautiful gay sex films ever produced, now available on DVD." The BFI added, "Set in a gentlemen’s outfitters c. 1976 the film takes its inspiration from the emotions aroused by a fetishistic love of corduroy, leather and tight trousers... a cast of professional erotic performers star alongside some gifted amateurs."

The BFI Flare premiere of Trouser Bar was covered in the Londoner's Diary in the 900,000-circulation London Evening Standard newspaper on Friday 18 March 2016, which referred to "the mystery" of this "trouser drama".

The "mystery" referenced in the Evening Standard diary is the fact that the author of the Trouser Bar script/scenario is officially unknown, despite earlier comments and claims to the contrary. The script is credited to "A Gentleman".

In July 2016, it was announced on Twitter via the @trouserbar unofficial film account and other sources that the Pathetique Films production would be released and distributed by Peccadillo Pictures. This included a tour to venues across the UK as part of the Pout Fest "Time & Tied" British gay short films "Boys on Film" roadshow. The unattributed film was officially released by Peccadillo Pictures in the UK on 20 July 2016, with the DVD released on 22 August 2016.

Trouser Bar has now appeared at film festivals around the world. The overseas premiere took place in Seattle, Washington, USA on 17 October 2016 at TWIST: Seattle Queer Film Festival, the largest LGBTQ Pacific Northwest festival - although that accolade may have been taken by a screening at the InDPanda International Film Festival in Hong Kong. Other screenings include: the 11th Pornfilmfestival Berlin in Berlin, Germany on 30 October 2016; as part of Les Gai Cine Mad in Madrid, Spain (21st Festival Internacional de Cine LGBT de Madrid); in Edmonton (Canada) for the Rainbow Visions LGBTQ film festival; and in Brazil for the 24th MixBrasil festival in São Paulo. MixBrasil voted Trouser Bar the Best International Short Film at the festival, with the trophy later presented to producer David McGillivray in London in December 2016 by Marcelo D'Avilla. The Fish&Chips International Erotic Film Festival in Torino, Italy, screened Trouser Bar in January 2017.

The film was also shown at the celebrated MIX NYC Festival in New York on 5 February 2017 - The New York Lesbian and Gay Experimental Film/Video Festival. MIX NYC is described on its website as "the longest-running queer film festival in New York City and a decisive launching pad for emerging talents - including some of the best-known names in cinema today." Peter de Rome was a noted New York filmmaker.

The film has since been booked for numerous film festivals around the world, including Shropshire (UK), Derby (UK), Turku and Helsinki (Finland), Brussels (Belgium), Hamburg (Germany) and Buenos Aires (Argentina).

== Controversy ==
The 20-minute film was extremely controversial. Although in post-production by November 2015, a release was unclear due to legal issues.

The situation was reported in The Guardian newspaper. The story was picked up in the USA by Entertainment Weekly and also reported by international news and lifestyle magazine Queerty.

A detailed account on the film's background and the resulting controversy is by writer, producer and comedy awards sponsor, John Fleming in his So It Goes blog. High-profile supporters of the film on Twitter have included author Neil Gaiman, writer and broadcaster Matthew Sweet and Lisi Tribble Russell.

In July 2016, the film's producers commented that "All those referring to Trouser Bar in any medium are earnestly advised to refer to its screenwriter as 'A Gentleman'. Pathetique Films firmly discourage any speculation as to authorship."

On 18 October 2016, producer David McGillivray (@makeadelivery) tweeted: "My dispute with the John Gielgud Charitable Trust has been settled. Trouser Bar can continue to be shown throughout the world."
