= Michael Phair =

Canadian politician (born 1950)

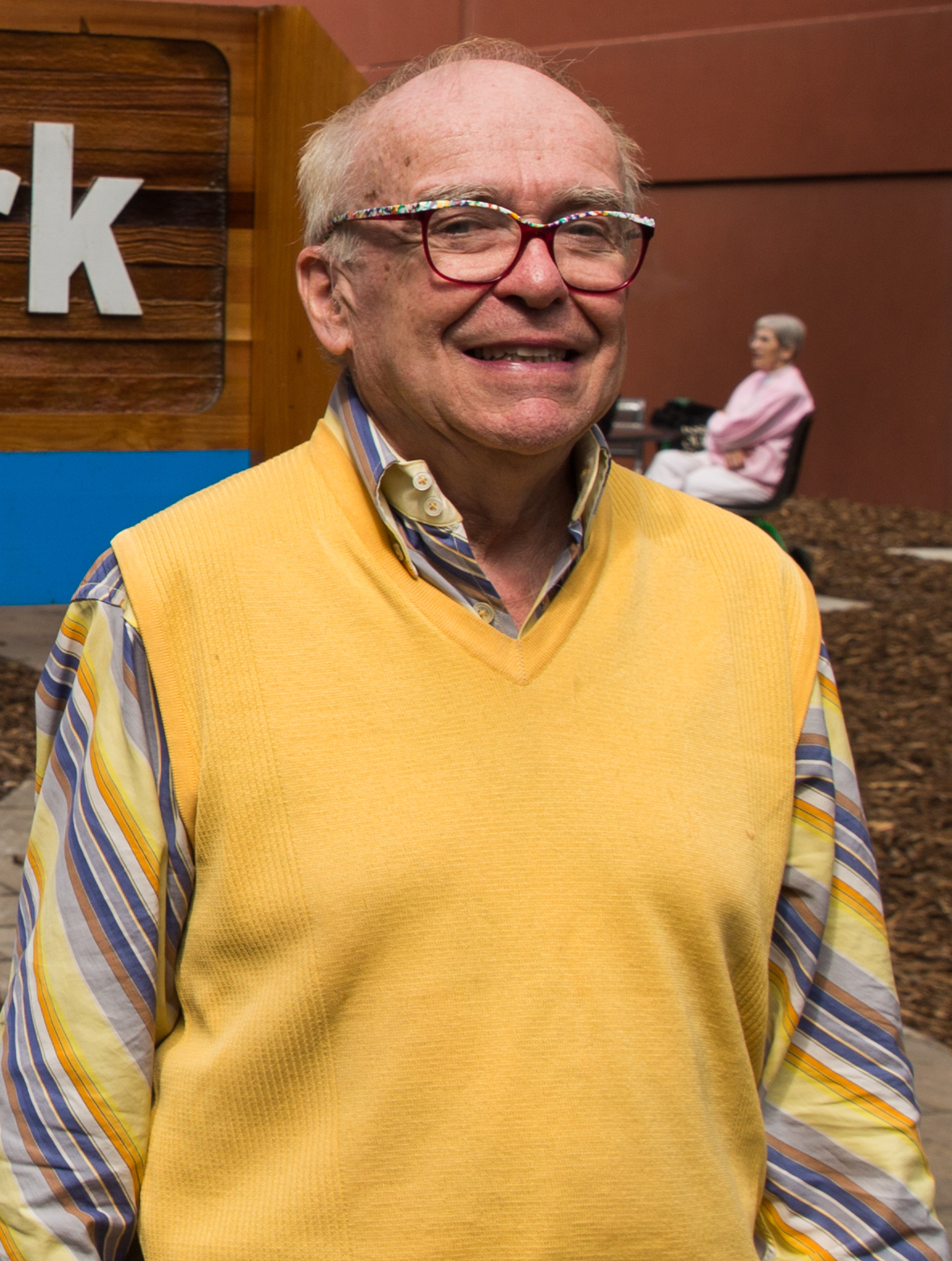

Edmonton City Councillor Ward 4
- In office 1992–2007
- Preceded by: Lance White
- Succeeded by: Ben Henderson

Personal details
- Born: August 1950 (age 76) Loyal, Wisconsin, U.S.
- Education: Towson State University; Loyal University; San Francisco State University

Michael Albert Phair (born August 1950) is a Canadian politician, who served on Edmonton City Council from 1992 until 2007. He was the first openly gay elected politician in the province of Alberta, as well as one of the earliest openly gay elected officials anywhere in Canada.

== Career ==
In 1981, Phair was one of 56 men arrested by the Edmonton Police Service during a raid by the morality control unit on the Pisces Health Spa, a gay bathhouse. He was convicted, but then appealed and had his record scrubbed.

The Pisces raid served to launch Phair's community activism as he helped to form many 2SLGBTQ community groups and organizations in Edmonton, including establishing the AIDS Network of Edmonton in 1984, which today is known as HIV Edmonton. He also worked closely with Maureen Irwin to organize the first parade for Edmonton Pride in the early 90s.

Following his retirement from elected politics, Phair has continued to be actively involved in the community, including serving as a board member of Edmonton Pride and as a founding member of the Edmonton Queer History Project. In addition, Phair is a founding member of the organization Paths for People, which advocates for active transportation infrastructure in Edmonton.

Phair is an adjunct professor with the Institute for Sexual Minority Studies and Services (iSMSS) in the Faculty of Education at the University of Alberta.

== Awards and honours ==
In June 2015, the Edmonton Public School Board honoured Phair by naming a new junior high school after him citing his work with HIV Edmonton and Homeward Trust. The school serves students in Grades 7 through 9 with a capacity of approximately 900 students. The school opened in 2017 in the Webber Greens neighbourhood.

On February 25, 2016, Phair was named Chairman of the University of Alberta Board of Governors. On August 16, 2019, Phair was replaced with the appointment of Kate Chisholm by the UCP government.

Also in 2016, a downtown Edmonton pocket park, Michael Phair Park was renamed after former city councillor Michael Phair in recognition of his longstanding service to the city. The park is located on 104th street, a short distance north of Jasper Ave.

In recognition of his community contributions, Phair received an honorary doctor of laws degree from the University of Alberta on June 8, 2022.

In 2022, Phair was appointed as Chancellor of St. Stephen's College at the University of Alberta.
