= Gay Morning America =

- Genre: Variety show
- Created by: George Sardi; Johnny Pool; Lynn Lavner
- Directed by: Jimmy Mellow
- Presented by: George Sardi; Johnny Pool
- Theme music composer: Lynn Lavner
- Country of origin: United States
- Original language: English
- No. of seasons: 3
- No. of episodes: 26

Production
- Producers: George Sardi; Johnny Pool

Original release
- Network: W59AT (Channel 59)
- Release: October 19, 1984 – November 23, 1985

Gay Morning America was a weekly volunteer-run variety show that aired on Manhattan public-access cable for three seasons from 1983 to 1985. For the first two seasons, the show ran for one hour on Friday mornings from 7:30-8:30 am EST, and was reduced to a 1/2 hour time slot on Saturday mornings from 11:30 am to 12:00 pm EST in the third and final season. The show also featured commercials for Greenwich Village gay establishments, as well as endorsements by the hosts which helped support the show. It originally aired on channel 59, W59AT. The program's archives are held in the collection of The LGBT Community Center National History Archive.

== History ==
Gay Morning America was founded by George Sardi, Johnny Pool, and Lynn Lavner, all of whom either co-owned or frequently performed at the piano bar Waverly Waverly. The bar, situated at the corner of Waverly Place in Greenwich Village, Manhattan, New York, hosted regular cabaret-style performances. Though the clientele was largely gay, it was not exclusively so. The show was recorded live at Metro-Access Inc. at 110 E. 23rd Street in Manhattan, New York. Many of the episodes were not recorded, or have since been lost. Those that remain were donated by George Sardi to The Center in Greenwich Village.

== Staff ==
George Sardi; producer, host

Johnny Savoy; producer, host

Lynn Lavner; performer

Johnny Pool; performer

Jerry Fitzpatrick; performer

Lord Byron Falk; performer

Leslie Irons; performer

Jimmy Mellow, director

== Segments ==
Most shows began with opening credits and the show's theme song, which was written by Lynn Lavner, followed by a community news segment. Recurring segments included recipes with Johnny Pool, exercises with Lord Byron, theater reviews with Leslie Irons, "girl talk" with Lynn Lavner, and sports with Jerry Fitzpatrick. There were also often musical performances by Lavner and Jerry Scott, who regularly performed at Waverly Waverly, as well as interviews with special guests, who were usually local LGBT celebrities.

A large portion of the run-time of most episodes was devoted to commercials for local gay-owned business. These commercials were typically a screen showing the business's name, address, and phone number, while one of the hosts read ad copy. The most frequently featured establishments were bars which hosted live performances, like Waverly Waverly, Limelight, The Monster, The Follies, Peeches Three, and Copacabana Bar, though other gay-owned businesses were also featured, including The Village Apothecary, a pharmacy which specialized in HIV/ AIDS treatments. There were also often plugs for other gay resources, such as hotlines and publications like Gay Yellow Pages and Connection.

During the third and final season, every fourth show was a "phone-in" episode, during which viewers could call in and talk with the hosts and special guests. Usually, these discussions followed major events within the gay community.

== Episodes ==
Season	Episode Number	Original Air Date	Special Guests
2	1	Oct. 19, 1984	Sgt. Charles Cochrane, president of the Gay Officers Action League (GOAL), and adult film actor Jack Wrangler
2	2	Oct. 26, 1984	Leslie Randolph, co-captain of Ramblers Soccer Team, musical performance by Jerry Scott
2	3	Nov. 2, 1984	Robin Tyler and Jack Coplin
2	4	Nov. 9 1984	Joni Rapp, Johnny De Maio, and Gordon Malone
2	5	Nov. 16, 1984	Maria Manville
2	6	Nov. 23, 1984	Gutter George, president of the Village Bowling League musical performance by Harriet Leider and Jerry Scott
2	7	Nov. 30, 1984	Comedic performance by ventriloquist Eddy Olsen and his puppet, "Harley"
2	8	Dec. 7, 1984	
2	9	Dec. 14, 1984	
2	10	Dec. 21, 1984	Casey Wayne and Frankie Lee Winter
2	11	Dec. 28, 1984	Frank Massey
2	12	Jan. 4, 1985	J. T. Denver
2	13	Jan. 11, 1985	Steve Garben and John Burke
2	14	Jan. 18, 1985	Fasinatin Gershwin, Lorenzo de Palma, and John Knight
2	15	Jan. 26, 1985	Tamar Hosansky and Lance Bradley
2	16	Feb. 1, 1985	Songs in Blume (A tribute to Bobby Blume) and members of the Safety and Fitness Exchange
2	17	Feb. 8, 1985	Rene Warren
2	18	Feb. 15, 19856	Aaron Gage, Gary Dee, and Gordon Malone
2	19	Feb. 22, 1985	Clips from the Miss Fire Island Competition
2	20	Mar. 8, 1985	Claire Christopher, softball pitcher and founder of the Women's Organization of League Sports (WOLS) musical performance by Sandy Doane and Jerry Scott
2	21	Mar. 15, 1985	Jackie Small, Jerry Scott, Candida Scott Piel, Michael Jackson, and Mark Goldstein
3	1	Oct. 26, 1985	Ray Lavner*
3	2	Nov. 2, 1985	Charles Bush
3	3	Nov. 9, 1985	Dalaria and Strobel
3	4	Nov. 16, 1985	David Rothenberg*
3	5	Nov. 23, 1985	Geoff Edholm, actor musical performance by Jerry Scott

* Denotes a "phone-in" show
