= Kristen Bjorn =

British pornographic film director and actor (born 1957)

- Born: 12 October 1957 (age 68); London, England
- Years active: 1989–present
- Height: 5 ft 10 in (1.78 m)
- Website: www.kristenbjorn.com

Kristen Bjorn (born 12 October 1957 in London, England) is a British director and producer of gay pornographic films and a former gay porn film actor.

== Early life ==
Bjorn was born in London, the son of a Russian mother and a British father. He was raised in Washington, D.C., where his father was stationed as a diplomat. He has a brother and two sisters. In an interview conducted in 1997, Bjorn stated that only one of his sisters knew of his profession as a maker of gay erotic films.

After graduating from high school, Bjorn set out to travel widely, to places including Asia, India, and Europe. His career goal at the time was to be "a photographer for a magazine like National Geographic. I wanted to travel across the world and photograph people. I was really very interested in different cultures."

== Career ==
Bjorn arrived in San Francisco in 1978, where he encountered the gay community for the first time. "[I]t was all very strange to me." Encouraged by the ideal of male beauty that he found in gay erotic magazines, Bjorn began working out and paying attention to his own physique. Around 1980, he was photographed by Fred Bisonnes for Mandate magazine. This was followed by two appearances in Falcon videos: Biker's Liberty (Falcon Studios 30, 1983) and The New Breed (Falcon Studios 32, 1983). Falcon chose the pseudonym Kristen Bjorn for him due to his resemblance to the Swedish tennis player Björn Borg.

In the foreword to a book devoted to Kristen Bjorn's work, director William Higgins wrote that, "[in] the relatively brief history of hardcore gay videos, Kristen Bjorn has emerged unchallenged as the best director to date."

In 1982 he moved to Brazil, pursuing his dream of becoming a professional photographer. In Brazil he stayed for eight years, in which he began to make the first male nude shots, starring only Brazilian models, which he sold to American gay magazines. In 1985, his friend and mentor Fred Bisonnes, who worked for Advocate Men magazine, invited him to submit his work to the magazine. Over the years, always under pressure from Bisonnes, he began to expand his creative space by making some softcore videos for the Advocate Men Live series.

In 1988 he directed and produced his first feature film Tropical Heatwave, which consisted of six masturbation scenes with muscular Brazilian men in exotic settings. With this film, Bjorn establishes his own brand of himself, utilizing a multi-racial cast and naturist settings. He later directed Carnaval in Rio and Island Fever, his first hardcore movies featuring sex scenes between men, including penetrations and multiple ejaculations.

He has taken care of all aspects of his films, from production to directing to photography, creating his own recognizable style. If the first films of his lacked dialogue, apart from the narrative voice, the later dialogue was incorporated into the script. Another and main characteristic of Bjorn's films is the use of unknown models, predominantly muscular and with a strong masculinity, without caring if they identify as heterosexual or homosexual but simply willing to participate in male sex scenes.

== Filmography ==
Director/videographer

- Tropical Heatwave (1989)
- Champs (1989)
- Carnaval in Rio (1989)
- Island Fever (1990)
- Manhattan Latin (1991)
- Caribbean Heat (1991)
- A Sailor in Sydney (1992)
- Jackaroos (1992)
- Manly Beach (1992)
- Call of the Wild (1993)
- Montreal Men (1993)
- Jungle Heat (1994)
- Paradise Plantation (1994)
- Mystery Men (1994)
- The Caracas Adventure (1995)
- The Vampire of Budapest (1995)
- Comrades in Arms (1995)
- Hungary for Men (1996)
- A World of Men (1996)
- Gangsters at Large (1996)
- Amazon Adventure (1996)
- Manwatcher (1997)
- The Anchor Hotel (1997)
- Hot Times in Little Havana (1998)
- Thick as Thieves (1998)
- Wet Dreams 1 (1999)
- Wet Dreams 2 (1999)
- Making It with Kristen Bjorn (documentary) (1999)
- The Isle of Man (2000)
- Dreamers (2000)
- The Agony of Ecstasy (documentary) (2000)
- Men Amongst the Ruins (2001)
- Bone Island (2001)
- Crossroads of Desire (2002)
- Dreamers: An Erotic Journey (2002)
- Parashooter (2003)
- Males Tales (2003)
- Manville (2004)
- Fire Dance (2004)
- Rocks & Hard Places 1&2 (2005)
- El Rancho (2005)
- Skin Deep 1&2 (2006)
- Action! 1&2 (2007)
- Pride 1&2 (2007)
- Horns of Plenty (2008)
- Tropical Adventure 1&2 (2009)
- Costa Brava: The Wild Coast (2010)
- Horns of Plenty 2 (2010)
- Sex City 1&2 (2011)
- Jagged Mountain 1&2 (2012)
- First Time 1&2 (2013)
- Strangers in Prague 1&2 (2014)
- On the Prowl 1&2&3 (2015)
- Bare to the Bone (2016)
- Trouser Bar (2016)
- In the Flesh 1&2 (2017)
- Busting Manholes (2018)
- Deep and Raw (2018)
- Meat Rack (2018)
- Wild Seed (2018)
- Fit to Fuck (2019)
- Catchers in the Raw (2019)
- Bareback Shooters (2020)
- Bigger They Come (2020)
- Man Sex (2020)
- Wild Attraction

Executive producer (with other directors)

- Hungarians (1997)
- Moscow: The Power of Submission (2000)
- Behind the Curtain (documentary, 2000)
- Italian Style (2002)
- A Sicilian Tale (2002)
- Heartbreak Hotel (2002)
- Out in Tuscany (2003)
- Under the Big Top (2003)
- Ambassadors of the Ice (2003)
- Journey to Greece (2004)
- Legion of Vengeance (2004)
- Hangar (2004)
- Trouser Bar (2015)

== Awards and nominations ==
- 2007 Barcelona International Erotic Film Festival Heatgay Award winner – Best Film (El Rancho – Kristen Bjorn), Best Director (El Rancho – Kristen Bjorn Productions), and Best Script (El Rancho – Kristen Bjorn Productions)
- 2010 XBIZ Award nomination – Gay Studio of the Year (Kristen Bjorn Production)

== See also ==
- List of British pornographic actors

Awards
Preceded by Wash West for Naked Highway	GayVN Awards for Best Director for Man Watcher; 1998	Succeeded by Jerry Douglas for Dream Team
