= The Anchor Hotel =

- Directed by: Kristen Bjorn
- Cinematography: Kristen Bjorn; The Bear
- Music by: Francois Girard
- Production company: Kristen Bjorn Productions
- Release date: 1997
- Running time: 115 minutes

The Anchor Hotel is a 1997 gay pornographic film, directed by Kristen Bjorn. It runs for 115 minutes and features 23 men. This video centers on military sailors who encounter each other in Miami and then have sex in hotel rooms. It is highly praised and honored with awards.

== Scenes ==
1. Mark Anthony, Pedro Pandilla, and Rafael Perez in threesome
2. Dean Spencer, Andras Garotni, and Ivan Cseska in threesome
3. The man in the solo scene; Sasha Borov, Sandor Vesanyi, Ferenc Botos, and Gabor Szabo in foursome
4. Antonio DiMarco and other nine men, including five masked men, in voodoo orgy
5. Igor Natenko and Karl Letovski

== Reception ==
Adam Gay Video Directory rated The Anchor Hotel all of five stars and called it a collaboration of "all the Bjorn Trademarks". Keeneye Reeves from TLA Video and Gay Chicago Magazine rated this video all of four stars. Brad Benedict from Ambush MAG praised it as "two hours of beautiful guys". The reviewer from Frisky Fans website rated it four out of five stars, verified that men wore condoms during sex scenes, and praised it with "minimalist plot". Nevertheless, he found the orgy scene the "weakest", even with "hot guys" involved. Two reviewers from Rad Video highly praised this video. One of them, Tim Evanson, called it Bjorn's redemption from his past few films that Evanson condemned, yet he negated the foursome scene as weak and noticed some men's lack of erection during the orgy scene.

In the 1997 Grabby Awards, it was awarded the "Best International Video", and Kristen Bjorn won the "Best Director" for this video and two other videos.
