= Centurians of Rome =

- DVD Cover
- Directed by: John Christopher
- Starring: George Payne; Scorpio
- Distributed by: Hand In Hand Films, Bijou Video
- Release date: 1981
- Running time: 80 minutes
- Country: United States
- Language: English

Centurians [sic] of Rome is a 1981 gay pornographic film made during the Golden Age of Porn and directed by John Christopher, starring George Payne and Scorpio. The project, released by Hand In Hand Films, is notable as the most expensive gay porno at the time of its release, financed by George Bosque, later convicted of stealing almost $2 million.

== Plot ==
After working together on Octavius's uncle's farm, friends Octavius and Demetrius go to sleep. Octavius dreams of having sex with Demetrius.

Roman soldiers wake them and kidnap Octavius because Octavius's uncle can't afford to pay taxes to Rome. The soldiers tell Demetrius to bring a pouch of silver the next day to pay the taxes and free Octavius.

That night, the soldiers' commander admires Octavius's beauty and commands the soldiers to rape Octavius.

While the soldiers are sleeping, Demetrius arrives to rescue Octavius. Sending Octavius out, Demetrius considers killing the commander but decides against it. As the friends run away, Octavius escapes, but Demetrius is captured.

The soldiers and their commander taunt Demetrius, saying he will be sold as a slave. At the slave market, Demetrius is sold to the emperor of Rome.

Before being transferred to the emperor, Demetrius is held in a dungeon where soldiers and other slaves rape him to train him to be submissive for the emperor.

Octavius brings the pouch of silver to the commander to pay the taxes and free Demetrius. However, the commander says the money isn't enough and rapes Octavius.

The commander offers to free Octavius but says if Octavius will stay one more day with him, the commander will try to free Demetrius. The commander says he won't even touch Octavius; he just wants to be near him and loves him. Octavius says he wants the commander to touch him and agrees to stay.

Demetrius is transferred to the emperor, who doesn't want Demetrius to be submissive after all. While having sex with the emperor as commanded, Demetrius pulls a knife to kill the emperor—but the emperor tells Demetrius that his friend Octavius will be killed if Demetrius kills the emperor, so Demetrius backs down.

The commander helps Octavius sneak into the emperor's room when the emperor isn't there and allows Octavius to rescue and escape with Demetrius. Once safe, Octavius tells Demetrius that he risked his life to save Demetrius because he loves Demetrius. They kiss.

The emperor discovers the commander in the emperor's room and decides to make the commander his next sex slave. The movie ends as the emperor begins to rape the commander.

== Cast ==
- George Payne as Demetrius
- David Hadkey as Old Slave
- Giuseppe Welch as Bath Slave
- Scorpio as Octavius
- Roy Garrett as Senator
- John Kovacs as Senator
- Michael Flent as The Emperor
- Ed Wiley as Argus
- Eric Ryan as Sadistic Commander
- Ryder Jones as Bath Slave
- Adam De Haven as Claudius
