= Community-engaged research =

Community-engaged research (CEnR) is the process of working collaboratively with groups of people affiliated by geographic proximity, special interests, or similar situations with respect to issues affecting their well-being. One of the most widely used forms of community-engaged research is community-based participatory research (CBPR), though it also encompasses action research and participatory action research. Another form of community-engaged research is integrated knowledge translation (iKT), defined as "an approach to doing research that applies the principles of knowledge translation to the entire research process". The iKT evolves around the concept of engaging different levels of knowledge users (community members, organizations working in the community, and policy makers) as equal partners in the research activities so that research outputs are more relevant to, and more likely to be useful to, the knowledge users.

== History ==
Community-engaged research arose in response to historical abuse of marginalized people by researchers, who failed to consider the needs of the community and potential benefits of the research. Types of CEnR include action research, community-based participatory research (CBPR), and participatory action research (PAR). The field of CEnR has grown rapidly since 2005.

== Process ==
Community-engaged research is planned in partnership with the community that is the intended target of the research. It requires the development of partnerships between researchers and the community, cooperation and negotiation between parties, collaboration, and a commitment to addressing local health concerns. This can create additional steps not traditionally found in research projects, such as jointly creating a mission statement or a memorandum of understanding to establish terminology, timelines, and expectations. These planning steps typically occur before funding is secured for the research project so that a meaningful and trusting relationship is the platform for the research activities. Community members may be skeptical of research conducted without compensation; researchers and the community can collaborate to define fair compensation for participation. The researchers also can involve the community members in the research activities and ensuring community member capacity building needs.

CEnR projects exist along a spectrum of the level of community involvement. In order from least- to most-involved, examples are investigator-driven research, community-placed research, community-based research, community-based participatory research, and community-driven research.

== Scope ==
Reviews of community-engaged research indicate that this type of research predominantly occurs in the US and the Americas. Europe is represented chiefly by studies in the United Kingdom, and some studies have been conducted in Australia as well. Few reviews of community-engaged research have included work done in Africa or Asia.
