= A Night at the Adonis =

A Night At The Adonis
- Directed by: Jack Deveau
- Starring: Jack Wrangler; Chris Michaels; Big Bill Eld (aka Bill Young); Mandingo
- Distributed by: Hand In Hand Films; Bijou Video
- Release date: 1978
- Running time: 90 minutes
- Country: United States
- Language: English

A Night At The Adonis is a 1978 gay pornographic film directed by Jack Deveau and starring Jack Wrangler, Chris Michaels, Big Bill Eld (also called Bill Young), and Mandingo. A highly plot-driven film, it hails from the "Golden Age" of gay pornography and was released by Hand In Hand Films.

The production was shot outside business hours at the now closed 1,400-seat Manhattan porn theatre The Adonis. The film, which would screen at the Adonis upon its release, was among the earliest to use a Steadicam in an opening shot that wanders through the hallways of the movie house.

== Premise ==
The film tracks Jack Wrangler's evening at the titular Adonis Theatre, a (then) well-known Times Square movie house where sexual activity took place. It featured a bit role by the theatre's real-life female cashier Bertha.

There are sex scenes throughout the theater, in the seats, in the balcony, in the back rows, in the passageways, in the offices, behind the counters and there is a grand orgy in the men's bathroom.

The guys in the film keep trying to get a young management trainee to engage with them, but he refuses because he wants to act "professionally", but the juice bar manager reminds him that "if you're not willing to play yourself, you shouldn't be running a playground."

== Cast ==
- Jack Wrangler
- Roger
- Jayson MacBride
- Malo
- Chris Michaels
- Big Bill Eld
- Mandingo
- Mark Woodward
- Jim Delegatti
- Ken Schneizez
- Muffie Mayer
- Geraldo
- Eartha Hugee
- Koos Chapman
- Lee Foster
- Keith Strickland
- Paul Maul
- Victor Williams
- Todd Travers
- Robert A. Glory

== Reception ==
Author Jeffrey Escoffier opined the "film was a tribute in part to the great role that porn theaters played in creating a sexual environment for gay men during the seventies ... it is considered to be one of Deveau's best movies ... it is the most elaborate exploration of the tension between promiscuity and gay men's everyday lives."

The editors of the book From the Arthouse to the Grindhouse noted how one patron of the theater stated "it was well-publicized when it came out, and some of the actors I used to see on the streets of New York ... it was rather odd to be in the exact theater that was being depicted on the screen, sort of a movie coming to life all around you ... what was happening on the screen was also happening in real life as you were watching the film."

== See also ==
- List of gay porn stars
- List of gay pornographic movie studios
- List of LGBTQ-related films of 1978
