= George Bosque =

American criminal

George Manuel Bosque (January 1955 – 1 July 1991) was an American security guard and movie producer. After stealing $1.85 million from a Brink's truck on August 15, 1980, he went on a spending spree, financing and producing Centurians of Rome [sic], a gay pornographic movie.

Bosque was pursued by the police and Lloyd's of London, which had insured the money he stole. He was arrested in November 1981, and, after initially pleading not guilty, pleaded guilty at his trial in February 1982. His plea was accepted by the federal prosecutor, Robert Mueller. Bosque was sentenced to 15 years in prison, and released in 1986. He died in 1991, at the age of 36, of a suspected drug overdose.
