= Jaap Penraat =

Dutch resistance fighter (1918–2006)

- Born: April 11, 1918; Amsterdam, Netherlands
- Died: June 25, 2006 (aged 88); Catskill, New York, US
- Known for: World War II resistance fighter, helped Jews to safety

Jaap Penraat (April 11, 1918 – June 25, 2006) was a Dutch resistance fighter during the Second World War.

== Life ==
Penraat was born in Amsterdam, Netherlands. As a child, he helped Jewish neighbors by switching lights for them on Shabbat, which they were forbidden to do. When the Nazis occupied The Netherlands and began acting against the Jews, Penraat was an interior designer, architect and sculptor of tiles and statues. He started his resistance activities by forging identity papers for Jews, but was discovered and jailed for several months. Later he made over 20 trips smuggling a total of 406 Jewish people to safety from the Netherlands to Spain via France by using his forgery skills to convince the Nazis they were slave laborers for the Atlantic Wall on France's coast. He lost only one man, who was hit by a train. Penraat was tortured by the Nazis, but revealed nothing about his operations. After his release, he continued his activities until 1944, when it became too risky to continue, and he spent the rest of the war hiding in a village, living on sugar beets.

After the war, Penraat became a noted designer in Amsterdam, until in 1958 he moved to the United States. In 1964, he designed the Dutch mill cafe, for the New York World's Fair.

He remained silent about his wartime activities until his daughters convinced him that his grandchildren should know about them. He went on to describe his experiences to school groups. In subsequent interviews, he insisted he had only "done the decent thing". Yad Vashem, the official Israeli memorial to victims of the Holocaust, awarded him the designation of Righteous Among the Nations and put him on its honor roll on June 11, 1988.

A longtime friend of Penraat's, Hudson Talbott, authored a children's book about Penraat's activities entitled Forging Freedom: A True Story of Heroism During the Holocaust. Talbott said in an interview that Penraat "just loved the idea of putting one over on the Nazis".

Penraat died at his home in Catskill, New York at the age of 88, three years following the death of his wife, Jettie. He is survived by his three daughters, Marjolijn, Mir, and Noelle.
