= Common Woman Books =

Feminist bookstore in Alberta, Canada

Common Woman Books was a feminist bookstore based in Edmonton, Alberta from 1978-1992. It provided mail order sources for feminists in Edmonton. The store stocked feminist, gay, and lesbian literature, newspapers, music, and books for young adults. They hosted events such as book-readings, book nights, and reading series. They organized concerts and took their books to small towns and other feminist events. The bookstore was a hub of activity centered on the desire for social change, and they had a bulletin board full of information, readings and signings, concerts, guest speakers, film festivals, etc.

== History ==
Common Woman Books Advertisement from page 2 of the December 1982 issue of Womonspace Newsletter.

Common Woman Books was founded in 1978 by Julie Anne LeGras, Mair Smith, and Halyna Chomiak Freeland in response to a perceived need to make feminist literature available to Alberta women. The bookstore was owned and operated by a non-profit collective of about 15 women and run by volunteers.

Founder Halyna Freeland was a lawyer, activist, teacher, community organizer, cooperative housing pioneer, politician, student, single mother, and art collector. In 1987, Freeland was on a “time out” from her legal practice and was employed part-time on a salary basis at Common Woman Books. After a shop expansion in 1988, former volunteer Andrea Harbour was employed full-time on salary to run the shop along with Freeland. Harbour was a transplanted New Zealander and a dedicated volunteer, who was instrumental in the shop’s expansion in 1989.

In the bookstore's earliest iteration, it was limited to a shelf in co-founder Halyna Freeland’s basement in Norwood, before it became a travelling bookstore. On September 12, 1981, they opened a storefront on 104th Street and 81st Avenue in Old Strathcona. In 1987 it moved to 109 Street in the Garneau Theatre building and adopted a longer name: Common Woman Books/The Radical Bookseller.

The bookstore moved a third time, back to Old Strathcona on Whyte Ave and 106th Street, but by then was competing against many other stores that carried feminist and lesbian books. The bookstore closed in 1992 due to economic and staffing pressures.

== Queer Activism ==
Common Woman Books had extremely strong ties to the queer community in Edmonton and is referenced in the 2018 Edmonton Queer History App. It is also featured in the Edmonton Queer History Project map.

In a 2018 article, Common Woman Books was described as part of the queer history of Edmonton. "A collective of women came together in the 1980s to launch the feminist bookstore Common Woman Books, on 81st Ave. and 104th St., to carry resources for gay women as well as literature on political action and feminism. Members of the collective shared what little profit they made." In the article, academic Jason Harley stated that “It was really important for us to be able to talk about the social side of life as well[...] Social life is not bars and clubs for everyone. And it was really great that there were these more quiet spaces to socialize.”

An advertisement for the bookstore is included in a 1984 Womonspace newsletter, describing it as “Alberta’s Only Feminist Bookstore” and selling non-sexist children’s books, records, jewelry, t-shirts, fiction, feminist theory, overcoming male and female stereotypes, and a good selection of lesbian literature.

== Archival holdings ==
- Common Woman Books fonds (PR2092) are held at the Provincial Archives of Alberta
- Documents regarding Common Woman Books are also available in Canadian Women's Movement Archives Fonds in the Archives and Special Collections of the University of Ottawa
