= Pisces Bathhouse Raid =

Historical event

The Pisces Bathhouse Raid occurred in Edmonton on May 30, 1981. It was a watershed moment in the city's LGBT history. The raid was part of a broader pattern of police harassment of the LGBTQ+ community across Canada, such as Operation Soap, despite the decriminalization of homosexuality in 1969. It was unique in that the raid was prompted by a complaint from an individual who had frequented the bathhouse.

== Raid ==
The bathhouse raid involved approximately 40 Edmonton Police Service officers and 7 RCMP officers, arresting 56 men and as "found-ins" of a "bawdy house" (a place for prostitution or indecent acts) and six employees. The raid began just after 1:30 in the morning. Two Crown Prosecutors were present as well, which was not typical. The officers took advice from the Toronto Police, who had carried out Operation Soap earlier the same year. The men were taken directly to the courthouse, questioned without any lawyers and given court dates. It was one of the largest mass-arrests in Alberta history.

== Legacy ==
Bathhouses had been an important gathering place for gay men in Edmonton since at least the 1940s, and the Pisces Spa was described as "the nicest bathhouse on the Prairies." The media coverage of the raid and the subsequent trials showed Edmonton's public that there was a large gay population in Edmonton, and many in Edmonton were critical of the raids. Outrage at the injustice of the raid galvanized Edmonton's 2SLGBTQIA+ community. Many felt that staying "under the radar" was no longer an option. The Gay Alliance Toward Equality (GATE) and the Privacy Defence Committee (PDC) were quickly formed to organize protests, raise funds for legal defense, and fight the charges against the arrested men. Michael Phair, who was arrested that night, began his political career after appealing his charges and became the first openly gay Edmonton City Council member.

Edmonton's first Pride events were held the following year in 1982, under the theme "Gay Pride Through Unity," directly in response to the raid.

In May 2021 on the 40th anniversary of the raids, the Edmonton Police Service issued a formal apology to the LGBTQ2S+ community acknowledging the pain, eroded trust, and fear their actions caused.
