= Lynn Lavner =

American musician and comedian

Lynn Lavner is an American comedian and musician from Brooklyn, New York. Much of her material is based around the facts that she is Jewish and a lesbian. She is frequently billed as "America's Most Politically Incorrect Entertainer."

Lavner began her career in 1981 when she wrote the music to the lesbian-themed play Ladies! Don't Spit and Holler! After a showing of the play, a fan came up to her and asked if the soundtrack was available on the album. When Lavner told her it wasn't, the fan, who had recently inherited a large amount of money, offered to put up the money so the soundtrack could be adapted into an album. Lavner is also credited with writing the theme music - as well as starring in various segments - to the New York City-based public access program Gay Morning America, which aired from 1983 to 1985.

Lavner's musical style harkens back to Tin Pan Alley pop. Lavner lists some of her major influences as George Gershwin, Irving Berlin, and Cole Porter. Lavner initially was inspired to begin playing piano by her father, who played to entertain company.

== Discography ==
- Ladies! Don't Spit and Holler!, 1981 (available on vinyl only)
- Something Different, 1983 (available on vinyl and cassette)
- I'd Rather Be Cute, 1986 (available on vinyl and cassette)
- You Are What You Wear, 1988 (available on CD, vinyl, and cassette)
- Butch Fatale, 1992 (available on CD and cassette)
