= Adam & Yves =

1974 film

- Adam & Yves Poster
- Directed by: Peter de Rome
- Written by: Peter de Rome
- Produced by: Peter de Rome; Jack Deveau
- Starring: Marcus Giovanni: Michael Hardwick
- Distributed by: Hand in Hand Productions
- Release date: 1974

Adam & Yves is a 1974 gay pornographic film written, produced and directed by Peter de Rome. The film stars Marcus Giovanni and Michael Hardwick. The film is notable for the unauthorized use of footage of Greta Garbo, which technically turned out to be her final appearance on film.

== Synopsis ==
Set in Paris during springtime, Adam & Yves follows Frenchman Yves and his pursuit of the American tourist Adam. The men have a brief affair, but a long-lasting relationship is prevented by Yves' insistence that they not share personal information.

== Cast ==
- Michael Hardwick as Adam
- Marcus Giovanni as Yves
- Kirk Luna as Bud
- Bill Eld as Narcissus
- Jack Deveau as Jacques
- Charles Pooney as Baba
- Daniel Montfort as customer in the woods
- Denise Royal as saleslady in the woods
- Jaap Penraat as collector in the woods

== Background ==
While making the film, director Peter de Rome reportedly stalked Greta Garbo around New York City, where the retired star was living. After much searching, De Rome located her and was able to shoot footage of Garbo walking across First Avenue. The footage was inserted into Adam & Yves, and its presence was explained by having Adam recalling how he once saw the elusive star. The Garbo footage was used without the star's knowledge or permission, and she was not paid for her appearance.

== Reception ==
In his review for Film Threat, Phil Hall wrote that "Garbo's scene is actually an irrelevant moment in the film." He goes on to say, "to be frank, the film is difficult to endure; much of the dialogue is badly dubbed, and too much of the talk is in rhyme, while the happy–chirpy music seems to belong in a 4–H educational movie." He concludes by stating, "if you are a Garbo fan, it is best to watch this movie on fast forward until you get to the final screen shot, and then, hit that Eject button!"

John Christakos wrote in Chicago Free Press that "the pacing is languid in the style of contemporary French film, as is much of the sex between the principals; all the racier bits are saved for the flashback vignettes; the final sexual segment, meanwhile, is an all-black orgy in a theater bathroom that remains one of the raunchiest T-room scenes on film."

== See also ==
- List of LGBTQ-related films of 1974
- List of male performers in gay porn films
- List of pornographic movie studios
