= Peter de Rome =

American writer, photographer and director of gay-themed, erotic films (1924–2014)

- Born: 28 June 1924; Juan-les-Pins, Côte d'Azur, France
- Died: 21 June 2014 (aged 89); Kent, England, UK
- Occupations: Screenwriter, photographer

Peter de Rome (28 June 1924 – 21 June 2014) was a writer, photographer, and director of gay-themed, erotic films. De Rome was born in Juan-les-Pins, Côte d'Azur, France, grew up in England, and became an American citizen in 1997.

== Career ==
De Rome volunteered in 1943 for the Royal Air Force and served in France, Belgium and Germany in World War II. Returning to civilian life in 1947, he started an acting career with the Birmingham Repertory Theatre, then switched to films, becoming a publicist, first with J. Arthur Rank, then with Sir Alexander Korda and later with David O. Selznick for whom he worked on The Third Man (1949) in Vienna, and then on Terminal Station (1953) in Rome (released in the U.S. as Indiscretion of an American Wife).

In 1956, he emigrated to the U.S. and first joined Tiffany & Company as a salesman, then left in 1963 to work in the Civil Rights Movement in the south with his good friend, actress Madeleine Sherwood. During this period, he made his first movie, a short documentary entitled New Orleans. Returning to New York, he made a succession of gay erotic shorts culminating with Hot Pants, which won a first prize in 1971 at the Wet Dream Film Festival in Amsterdam. This led to a suggestion from producer Jack Deveau to select eight movies to be released commercially as The Erotic Films of Peter de Rome. These shorts opened to critical acclaim at Lincoln Center in NYC, and later ran successfully in most large cities across the U.S.

In 1974, de Rome went to Paris to make his first full-length feature entitled Adam & Yves, which was followed in 1976 by The Destroying Angel, an exercise in gay horror, supposedly based on Edgar Allan Poe, and using a title similar to Exterminating Angel (1962) by Luis Buñuel. However, with the advent of HIV/AIDS in the early 80s, de Rome ceased making movies.

During this time de Rome worked in publicity for Paramount Pictures, retiring in 1989. In 1997 de Rome took out U.S. citizenship. His films had limited circulation in the UK, but in 2007 the British Film Institute (BFI) requested a selection of de Rome's films to be held in their Archive and shown later that year at the London Lesbian & Gay Film Festival. This program included a 45-minute documentary made by David McGillivray called Peter de Rome: Grandfather of Gay Porn, and proved so successful that the BFI released the whole program on DVD.

A full-length documentary entitled Peter de Rome: Grandfather of Gay Porn was produced in de Rome's 90th year. The film was screened at the Sheffield Documentary Festival. De Rome was unable to attend due to illness.

De Rome was diagnosed with leukaemia in May 2014. He died in the medieval cottage that had been his long-term home in Sandwich, Kent on 21st of June 2014, a week before his 90th birthday.

== Partial filmography ==
=== Short films ===
- New Orleans (1964)
- Shower (1965)
- The Fire Island Story (1965)
- Scopo (1966)
- Boogaloo (1966)
- Double Exposure (1969)
- Encounter (1970)
- Green Thoughts (1970)
- The Second Coming (1970)
- In Camera (1977)
- Brown Study (1979)
- Help Wanted (1971)
- Moulage (1971)
- Mumbo Jumbo (1971)
- Prometheus (1972)
- Daydreams from a Crosstown Bus (1972)
- Underground (1972)
- Kensington Gorey (1973/2013)
- The Box (1974)
- Badedas (1976)
- Marathon (1979)

=== Feature films ===
- The Erotic Films of Peter De Rome (1973)
- Adam & Yves (1974)
- The Destroying Angel (1976)

=== Documentaries ===
- Fragments: The Incomplete Films of Peter de Rome (2011)
- Peter de Rome: Grandfather of Gay Porn (2013)

== Bibliography ==
- The Erotic World of Peter de Rome (Alyson Publications, 1984) – autobiography
