= Jack Wrangler =

American actor, director and producer

- Born: John Robert Stillman; July 11, 1946; Beverly Hills, California, U.S.
- Died: April 7, 2009 (aged 62); New York City, New York, U.S.
- Other name: Jack Stillman
- Education: Northwestern University
- Occupations: Actor, director and producer
- Years active: 1970–2003
- Spouse: Margaret Whiting (m. 1994)

John Robert Stillman (July 11, 1946 – April 7, 2009), billed professionally as Jack Wrangler, was an American gay pornographic film actor, theatrical producer, director, and writer. He performed in both gay and straight films.

Open about his homosexuality and adult film work throughout his career, Wrangler was an icon of the gay-liberation movement. The 2008 feature-length documentary Wrangler: Anatomy of an Icon examines his life and career.

== Early life ==
Wrangler was born John Robert Stillman in Beverly Hills, California. His father was Hollywood film and television producer Robert Thurston Stillman, who produced such films as Champion, Second Chorus, and Home of the Brave and produced television series such as Boots and Saddles, Rawhide, and Bonanza. His mother, Ruth Clark Stillman, was a former dancer in Busby Berkeley musicals.

Stillman began his acting career at the age of nine in the television series The Faith of Our Children (1953–1955). The series, which starred Eleanor Powell, was a syndicated religious family show that won five local Emmy Awards.

He became aware of his homosexuality when he was 10 years old.

Stillman graduated in 1968 with a degree in theater from the College of Speech at Northwestern University, Evanston, Illinois.

== Career ==
=== Adult film ===
Despite his acting skills, Stillman found only limited early work in Los Angeles, California, and New York City on the stage and as a model and dancer. One of his first roles was in Douglas Dean Goodman's play Special Friends, one of the first gay-themed plays by a gay playwright to be performed in San Francisco, California. He played a former prostitute from Arkansas who becomes a bad go-go dancer in California, in a role which required extensive nudity. He finally settled in New York City and found work as a bartender and go-go dancer.

In 1970, he made his first appearance in a male strip show, using the name "Jack Wrangler." (The pseudonymous last name was taken from the label on his Wrangler-brand work shirt.)

Wrangler was approached to appear in gay pornographic films by Magnum Studios, the pioneering gay adult film studio and magazine publisher, after studio heads saw a poster for Special Friends featuring him semi-nude. His first gay porn film was 1970's Eyes of a Stranger (also known as Eyes of a Gay Stranger; Magnum Studios), one of the first hard-core gay adult films to be released commercially in the United States. Wrangler performed in gay pornographic films for several reasons. First he saw them as culturally subversive and politically liberating:

At the time we were all trying to find out who the hell we were as individuals, what we wanted specifically on our own terms, who we wanted to be, what our potentials were, what our differences were, what made us unique… And I think that's why the XXX-rated films were important, because it was like, Oh, my God, there are other people who like the same things as me, like leather, or being blown on a pool table. [Laughs] It was a start—literally stripping ourselves naked and trying to begin from there.

Second, he "wasn't comfortable in his own skin" and wanted some adventure in his life.

During his adult-film career, Wrangler appeared in 47 films. Among his more notable gay films were Kansas City Trucking Co., Hot House, Sex Machine, and A Night at the Adonis.

In 1978, Wrangler made the move to heterosexual adult film, making his debut in China Sisters which included his first sexual encounter with a woman on film. China Sisters featured a plot involving two women who seduce a gay man and turn him straight. Wrangler told Terry Gross of NPR that the film crew knew he was gay and cheered him on while he lost his heterosexual virginity. He quickly made a number of well-known and popular straight-adult films, including Jack and Jill, Roommates, and The Devil in Miss Jones 2. He was a favorite of director Chuck Vincent, the critically acclaimed, openly gay director of some of the top straight-adult films of the 1970s and 1980s. Vincent's films subvert straight porn's traditional focus on the female body by focusing on Wrangler's body and fixing the viewer's eye on the male (rather than female) sexual experience.

As Wrangler, he became an icon of the gay-liberation movement. His popularity as a gay-porn star was so great that "Jack Wrangler" was prominently mentioned in playwright Doric Wilson's 1984 play, Forever After.

=== Theatre ===
As Wrangler was achieving fame as one of the first iconic gay-porn stars, his acting career also blossomed. He co-starred alongside playwright and actor Robert Patrick in Patrick's 1979 play T-Shirts at The Glines theater in New York City. In 1985, Wrangler wrote the book for the musical I Love You, Jimmy Valentine – which starred his future wife, Margaret Whiting. In the mid-1980s, he appeared in the play Soul Survivor, a comedy about a gay man whose lover has died of AIDS.

By this time Wrangler's adult-film career was tapering off. He published his autobiography, The Jack Wrangler Story, or What's a Nice Boy Like You Doing?, in 1984. Whiting demanded that he give up his porn career and live erotic shows. In 1986 at the age of 40, he appeared in his final adult picture, a straight porn film titled Rising Star (Caballero Home Video).

Wrangler turned his attention to Whiting's career and cabaret. He became a board member of the Johnny Mercer Foundation after its founding in 1982, and worked to promote Mercer's music. He wrote and produced a 1985 cabaret show for Whiting that featured Mercer's music, and in 1996 co-wrote and produced Midnight in the Garden of Good and Evil: The Jazz Concert (inspired by the Mercer music used in the film Midnight in the Garden of Good and Evil). A year later, he helped conceive the 1997 Broadway revue Dream, which starred Whiting and contained many Mercer songs. Wrangler conceived the idea of a ballet based on Mercer's 1946 musical St. Louis Woman, which was performed by the Dance Theater of Harlem in 2003. Wrangler was also a promoter of the cabaret singer Carol Woods, writing and producing several shows for her between 1984 and 2001. Wrangler also wrote, directed, or produced a number of other plays, musicals and revues, including The Valentine Touch, The First Lady and Other Stories of Our Times, and Irina Abroad!

Wrangler authored a column on health and fitness, "Wrangler's Weights and Measures", for the short-lived, gay-lifestyle magazine Au Contraire in 1979.

== Personal life ==
Wrangler was a virgin to heterosexual sex until college. In 1976, Wrangler met singer Margaret Whiting, 22 years his senior, in a nightclub; Wrangler later recalled: "I was with my manager when I looked over at Margaret, who was surrounded by five guys in a booth. There she was with the hair, the furs and the big gestures. I thought, 'Boy, now that's New York! That's glamour!' I had to meet her." Their romance began a few weeks later.

The couple was strongly criticized for the relationship, and Wrangler was accused of "turning straight" and entering the relationship simply for money. However, Wrangler always considered himself homosexual. "I'm not bisexual and I'm not straight", Wrangler later said. "I'm gay, but I could never live a gay lifestyle, because I'm much too competitive. When I was with a guy I would always want to be better than him: what we were accomplishing, what we were wearing—anything. With a woman you compete like crazy, but coming from different points of view, and as far as I'm concerned, that was doable."

Nonetheless, the early years of their relationship were difficult, as Whiting and Wrangler struggled with the latter's homosexuality. When Wrangler shouted at her in a restaurant that he was gay, Whiting responded, "Only around the edges, dear." Wrangler explained in an interview: "When I got with Margaret, I knew I had to change course. She would have my bags packed and sitting outside the door when I got home at night and things like that. Plus I would go through massive guilt whenever I did go out with a guy and I was with her. So I finally said that's it. I went to her one night and said, I'm never going to cheat on you again with anybody. So my sex life became very masturbatory. And I'm good at that - very good at that, in fact." The couple was married from 1994 until his death.

In 1980, Wrangler, his step-grandmother, and his manager were attacked, pistol-whipped, and tied up by six burglars at his step-grandmother's home in Bel Air, California. The robbers made off with more than $250,000 in furs and cash.

In 1998, Wrangler and Whiting filed a $3 million lawsuit against New York City when the 74-year-old Whiting tripped on loose pavement and broke her hip. Their suit claimed $2 million in damages for her injuries and $1 million for loss of conjugal relations.

In 2008, a feature-length documentary film about Wrangler, Wrangler: Anatomy of an Icon, premiered at Newfest and received the GayVN Award. It was produced and directed by Jeffrey Schwarz of Automat Pictures, and is distributed by TLA Releasing.

Wrangler died on April 7, 2009, at the age of 62 from complications from emphysema.

== Selected filmography ==
- Eyes of a Stranger (1970)
- Kansas City Trucking Co. (1976)
- A Night At The Adonis (1978)
- Gemini (1979)
- Jack and Jill (1979)
- Hot House (1980)
- Sex Machine (1980)
- Wanted (1980)
- Roommates (1981)
- The Devil in Miss Jones 2 (1982)
- In Love (1983)

== See also ==
- Golden Age of Porn
- List of male performers in gay porn films
