= Elevator operator =

Person specifically employed to operate a manually operated elevator

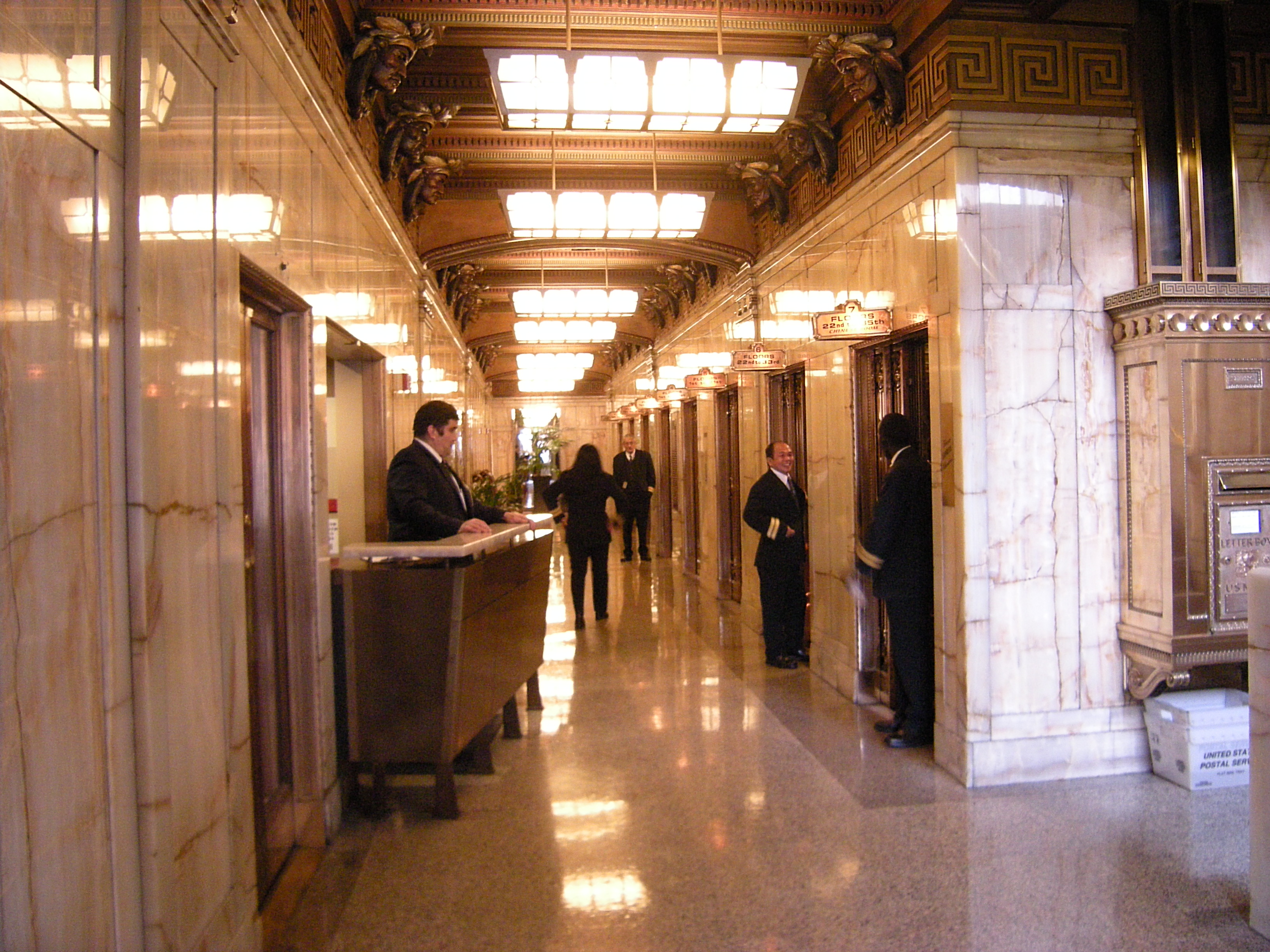
The Smith Tower in Seattle, Washington formerly used traditional elevator operators, as seen in this 2008 photo.

An elevator operator (North American English), liftman (in Commonwealth English, usually lift attendant), or lift girl (in British English), is a person specifically employed to operate a manually operated elevator.

While largely considered an obsolete occupation, elevator operators continue to work in historic installations and fill modern-day niches.

== Historic description ==
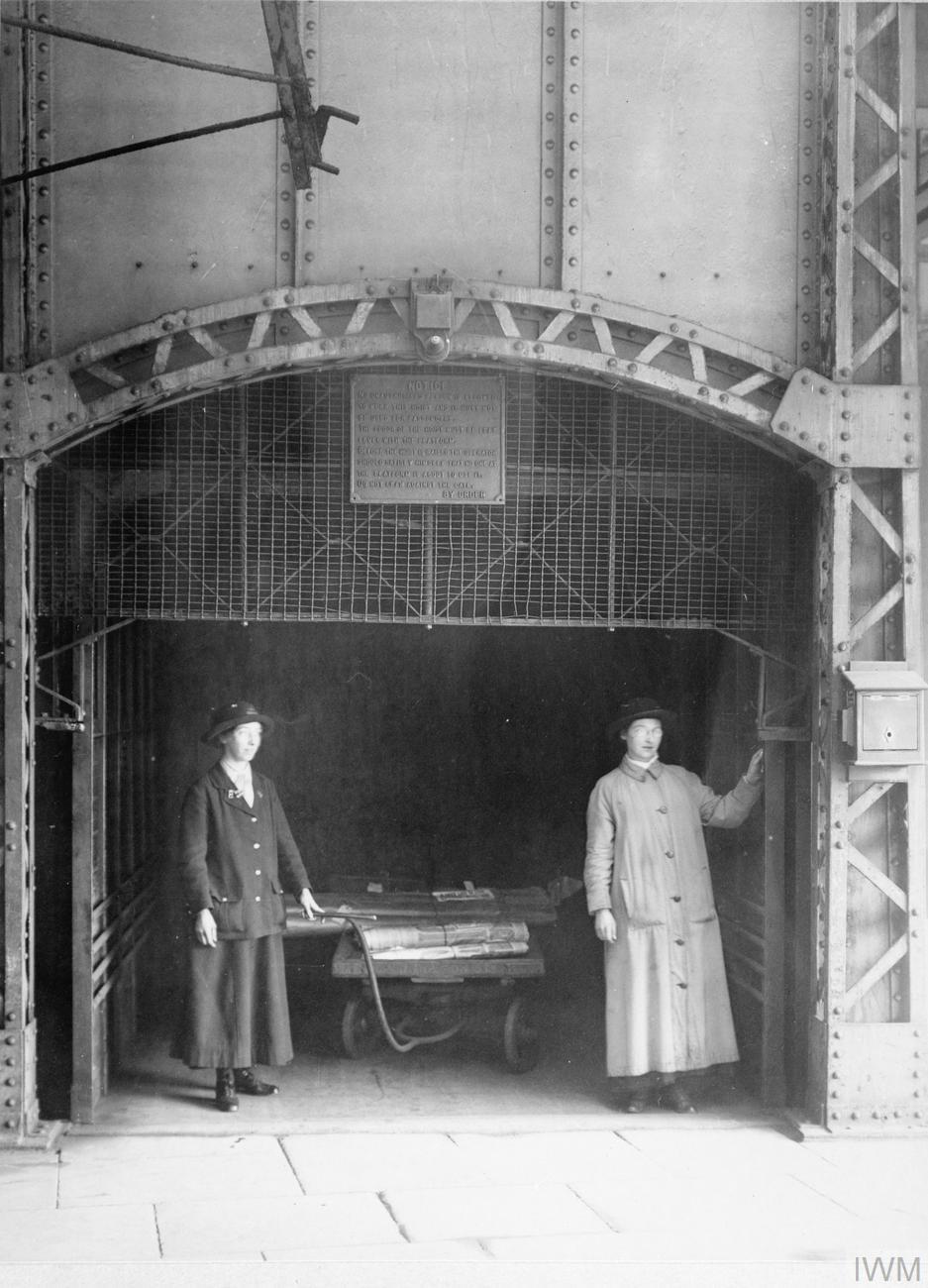
A lift attendant of the Lancashire and Yorkshire Railway at work at Bolton railway station (1917)

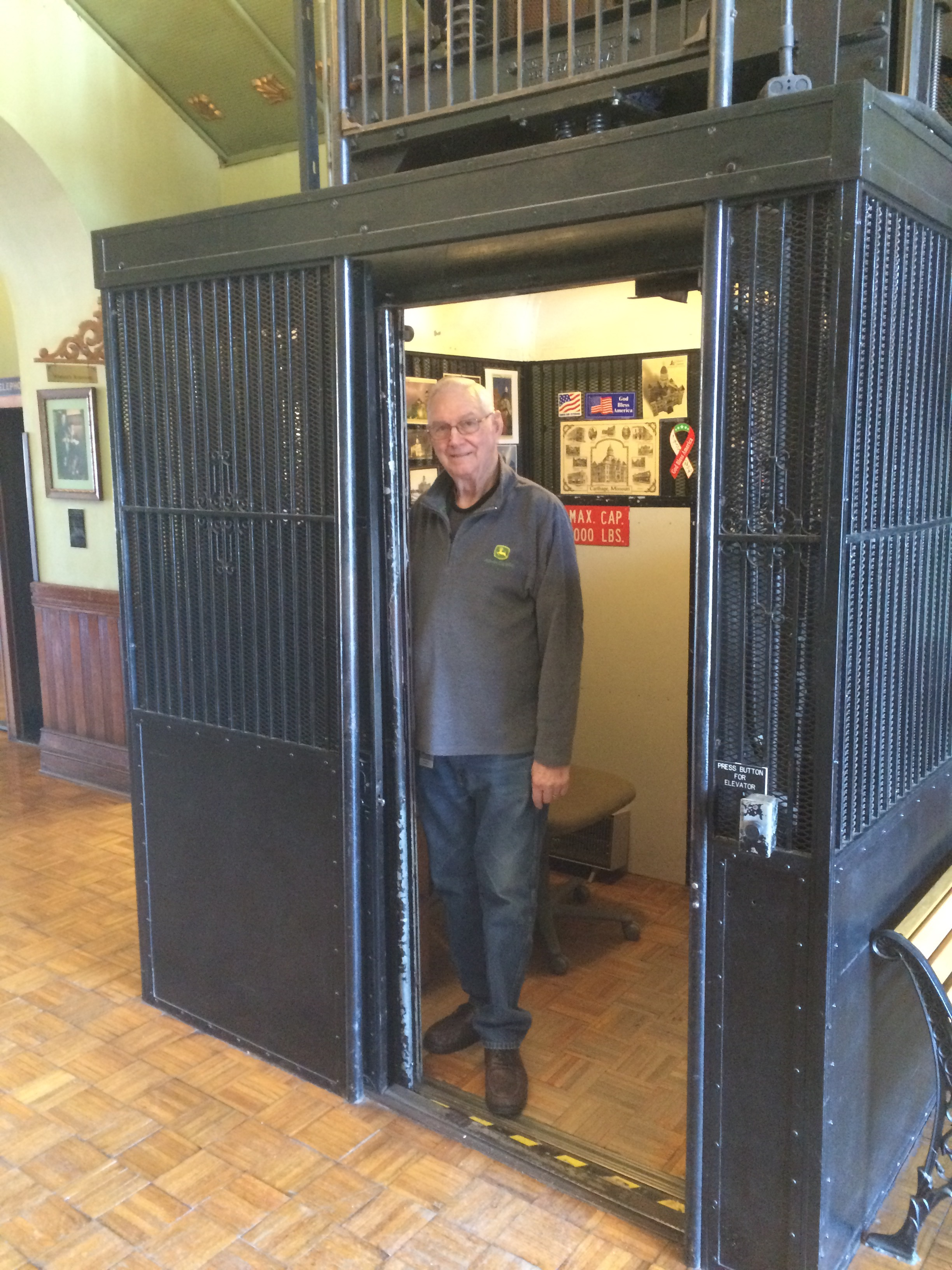
In the Carthage, Missouri, Courthouse

For many years, elevators in public buildings were operated by an employee of the business, who doubled as a friendly guide to tenants of the building or departments of the store. In many cases, the operator had the responsibility of ensuring safe loading, door closure, and synchronizing the floor of the elevator cabin with that of the building. In the event of mechanical problems, they would be a calming influence while waiting for the repair technician. The operator might have been someone incapable of other work, such as an injured veteran.

Being an effective elevator operator required many skills. Manual elevators were often controlled by a large lever. The elevator operator had to regulate the elevator's speed, which typically required a good sense of timing to consistently stop the elevator level with each floor. In addition to their training in operation and safety, department stores later combined the role of operator with greeter and tour guide, announcing product departments, floor by floor, and occasionally mentioning special offers.

== Remaining examples ==
=== Buildings ===
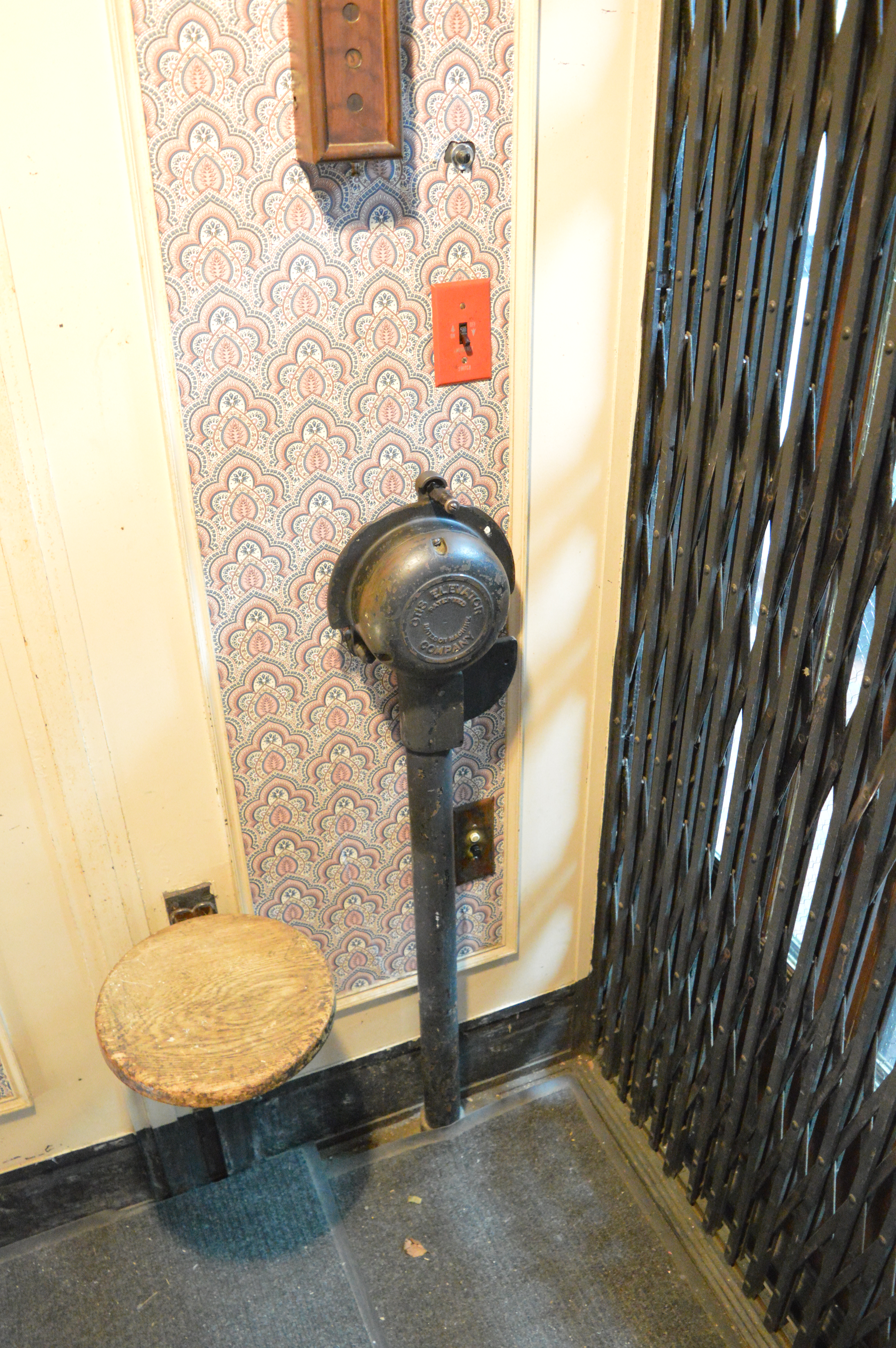
Controls of a 1920s Otis elevator

With the advent of user-operated elevators such as those utilizing push buttons to select the desired floor, few elevator operators remain. A few older buildings still maintain working manually operated elevators and thus elevator operators may be employed to run them. In Dayton, Ohio, the Mendelson Liquidation Outlet operates out of an old Delco building that has an old passenger elevator run by an operator. The Fine Arts Building in Chicago; the Young–Quinlan Building in downtown Minneapolis, Minnesota; City Hall in Buffalo, New York; the Commodore Apartment Building in Louisville, Kentucky; City Hall in Asheville, North Carolina; and the Cyr Building in downtown Waterville, Maine are a few in the United States to employ elevator operators. In 2017, it was estimated that over 50 buildings in New York City used elevator operators, primarily in apartment buildings on the Upper East and West Sides of Manhattan, as well as some buildings in Brooklyn. The Stockholm Concert Hall, in Sweden, employs an elevator operator by necessity since there is an entrance to the elevator directly from street level, requiring an employee to be positioned in the elevator to inspect tickets.

In more modern buildings, elevator operators are still occasionally encountered. For example, they are commonly seen in Japanese department stores such as Sogo and Mitsukoshi in Japan and Taiwan, as well as high speed elevators in skyscrapers, as seen in Taipei 101, and at the Lincoln Center for the Performing Arts. Some monuments, such as the Space Needle in Seattle, the Eiffel Tower in Paris and the CN Tower in Toronto, employ elevator operators to operate specialized or high-speed elevators, discuss the monument (or the elevator technology) and help direct crowd traffic.

=== New York City Subway stations ===
There are a few elevator operators working in the New York City Subway system. They are located at five stations: 168th Street, 181st Street at St. Nicholas Avenue and at Fort Washington Avenue, 190th Street, and 191st Street in Washington Heights, upper Manhattan. In these stations, elevators serve as the sole or primary means of non-emergency access. The elevator attendants currently serve as a way to reassure passengers as the elevators are the only entrance to the platforms, and passengers often wait for the elevators with an attendant. The attendants at the five stations are primarily maintenance and cleaning workers who suffered injuries that made it hard for them to continue doing their original jobs.

==== History ====
The elevators were automated during the 1970s, but the operators were retained, though they were reduced in quantity in 2003.

In 2004, the number of elevator attendants at the stations was reduced to one per deep-bore station as a result of budget cuts by the Metropolitan Transportation Authority (MTA). The agency had intended to remove all the attendants, but kept one in each station after many riders protested. The change saved $1.2 million a year. In November 2007, the MTA proposed to eliminate the operators' positions, but on December 7, 2007, the MTA announced that it would not remove the remaining elevator operators due to pushback from elected officials and residents from the area. In October 2018, the MTA again proposed removing the elevator operators at the five stations, but this decision was reversed after dissent from the Transport Workers' Union.

=== San Francisco BART ===
As of 2022, elevator operators are currently employed in Market Street stations of the San Francisco Bay Area's Bay Area Rapid Transit rapid transit system to provide for passenger safety and elevator cleanliness amidst regional problems with homelessness and substance dependence.

=== Amusement parks ===
Theme parks and amusement parks often have observation towers, which employ elevator operators. An example is the Sky Tower at Six Flags Magic Mountain in Santa Clarita, California. While these rides may have modern or button-operated elevators that a patron is capable of using, they often employ ride operators for safety and crowd control purposes. Because many jurisdictions have stringent injury liability laws for amusement park operators and the fact that vandalism can be a big problem, some parks do not allow patrons to ride these rides without an employee present. Additionally, if there is a museum at the top of such a ride, the operator will usually give an introduction to the purpose and contents of the museum and other promotional messages about the park.

=== Construction sites ===
Manual elevator operators can be employed in the construction of multi-storied buildings, either using temporary exterior hoists or traditional elevators that are still being installed.

=== Elevator girls in Japan ===
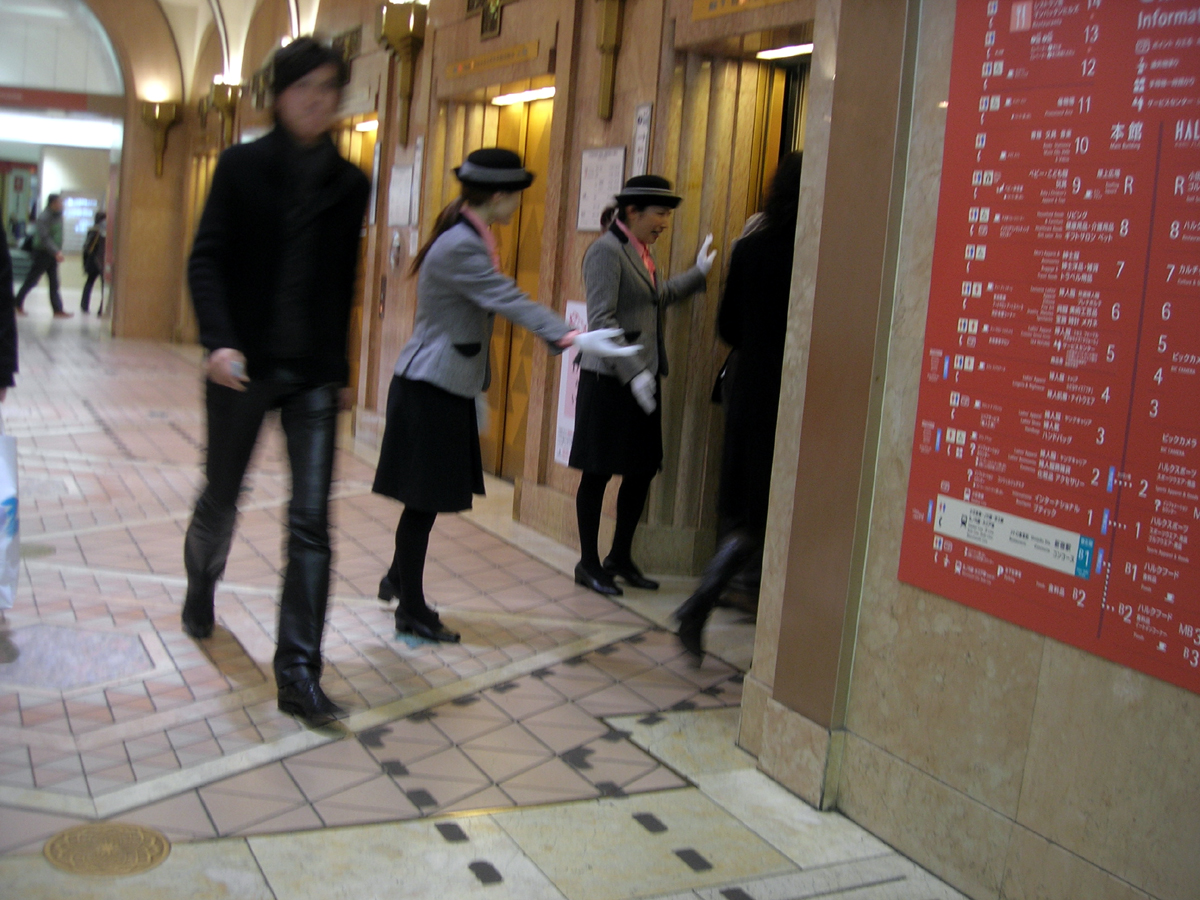
Japanese elevator operators at work (Odakyu Department Store head office, Shinjuku)

Elevator girl (Note: エレベーターガール, Erebētāgāru), shorted to erega, describes the occupation of women who operate elevators in Japan. When the role became common in the 1920s, additional terms such as shokoki garu ("up and down controller girl"), hakojo ("box girl"), and erebeta no onna untensyu ("woman elevator driver") were also used to describe this role. However, erebeta girl remains the popular term for this occupation, a staple sight of urban Japan. Sporting tailored uniforms and robotic smiles, elevator girls are trained extensively in polite speaking and posture. In contrast with the salaryman of Japan, the elevator girl has been symbolic of women's roles in society literally and physically moving up and down as women entered the Japanese workforce. Today, few elevator girls remain in department stores, although those which retain them consider the elevator girl an effective marketing strategy. Elevator girls are an example of feminized occupations in the workplace.

==== History ====
Prior to 1929, elevator operators were men. In 1929, the Ueno Branch of Matsuzakaya department store hired women to operate the elevators in its new facilities. In the same year, Yomiuri Shinbun ran an article calling elevator operation the new occupation of Japanese women, commenting on the experiences of the first elevator girls. Although women in the United States had performed the same duty previously, in Japan the shift to female elevator operators was remarkable. At first, female elevator operators had to perform the same functional tasks as male operators, operating levers and closing elevator doors. As elevators became automated, the role shifted to greeting customers, advertising sales to customers, and making announcements.

==== Depiction ====
Elevator girls appear in numerous works of literature and film. A key storytelling tool using the elevator girl has been to juxtapose the reserved, controlled role of the elevator girl at work with the unknown, potentially scandalous role that the woman plays in her personal life. A pornographic film featuring Shoji Miyuki, Going Up: I am an Elevator Girl, played off this contrast, telling the story of a demure elevator girl who is secretly a nymphomaniac engaging in sexual activities in the elevator.

Popular anime series Crayon Shin Chan featured an elevator girl who became trapped in her elevator when the elevator broke.

The 2009 film Elevator Nightmare was advertised by comedienne Torii Miyuki watching the film in an elevator with three professional elevator girls.

Karl Greenfeld's 1995 expose of Japanese culture Speed Tribes: Days and Nights with Japan's Next Generation, featured a fictional story of an elevator girl who works the elevator by day and engages in drugs and risky sex by night.

Courtney Barnett, Ramones and Electric Callboy have songs named "Elevator Operator".
