= Chocoball Mukai =

Japanese professional wrestler and porno actor (born 1966)

- Born: Yutaka Mukaiyama (向山裕, Mukaiyama Yutaka); December 15, 1966 (age 59); Shibukawa, Gunma Prefecture, Japan
- Other name: Chocoball Mukai
- Sports career
- Height: 5 ft 7.75 in (1.72 m)
- Weight: 90 kg (198 lb; 14 st 2 lb)
- Sport: Frontier Martial-Arts Wrestling

Yutaka Mukaiyama (向山裕, Mukaiyama Yutaka; born December 15, 1966) is a Japanese pornographic actor and a former professional wrestler better known as Chocoball Mukai (チョコボール向井, Chokobōru Mukai).

Beginning his career in 1990s, Mukai became one of the more well known JAV stars in all of Japan, and holds the record for being the highest paid AV actor ever, earning over ¥20 million JPY at the height of his fame.

Initially wanting to be a professional wrestler, Mukai returned to his passion and joined Frontier Martial Arts Wrestling (FMW) in 1999, competing for the promotion as well as IWA Japan until his retirement.

== Adult film career ==
In January 1990, Mukaiyama applied for an acting audition, simply requesting actors. When Mukaiyama arrived, he discovered it was for a JAV movie, but was offered the part and accepted. Being more muscular than most other Japanese porn stars made Mukaiyama stand out during his early career. Soon after acting in his first film, Mukaiyama was given the name "Chocoball Mukaiyama", a reference to his dark brown scrotum's resemblance to Chocoball candy, though the name was later shortened to simply Chocoball Mukai. Mukai remained active in the porn industry for 17 years.

== Professional wrestling career ==
=== New Japan Pro-Wrestling (1985) ===
After graduating from high school, Mukaiyama applied and was accepted into the New Japan Pro-Wrestling (NJPW) dojo in 1985, but just one week into his training suffered a severe back injury and was forced to leave the dojo.

=== Frontier Martial Arts Wrestling (1999–2002) ===
Years later, after establishing himself as a well known porn star, Mukai announced his intentions to return to pro wrestling in the late 1990s, and after training in their dojo under Koji Nakagawa, he debuted for Frontier Martial Arts Wrestling (FMW) as Chocoball Mukai in September 1999. Early into his career, Mukai formed an alliance with Ricky Fuji and Flying Kid Ichihara, winning the vacant WEW Six Man Tag Team Championship at the FMW 10th Anniversary Show in November. After dropping the titles in December, Mukai spent the early months of 2000 aligning himself with Kodo Fuyuki, and officially joined the revamped Shin Fuyuki Gun ("New Fuyuki Army") on May 28, 2000, winning the WEW 6 Man Tag Titles once again, this time with Fuyuki and Kyoko Inoue. After Shin Fuyuki Gun broke up in January 2001, Mukai mainly worked in opening matches, but remained with FMW until its closure in February 2002.

=== Other promotions and retirement (2002–2006) ===
After FMW's closure, Mukai continued to work for a number of independent promotions, including Fuyuki Army, DDT Pro Wrestling and Pro Wrestling Zero1, however, beginning in 2004, his appearances became more sporadic after he was arrested for public indecency. He made a one-off return to New Japan Pro-Wrestling (NJPW) on December 18, 2005, losing to Yuji Nagata. Mukai's last match to date took place on November 26, 2006, when he defeated Yuta Yoshikawa at a Battlarts event. He announced his retirement from pro wrestling the following month.

== Personal life ==
In 1995, Mukai's back injury began causing him trouble again, and he suffered a herniated disc as a result. He also contracted acute hepatitis in 1997.

Mukai fell seriously ill in July 2017, and was hospitalised after having a stroke in his bar. Mukai soon contracted sepsis in hospital and was in critical condition for a short while but was able to recover and was eventually released from hospital in December. As of May 2018, Mukai said he still suffered from paralysis in his hands and feet, and was able to walk but unable to run.

== Legal issues ==
Mukaiyama and fellow JAV star Emi Kuroda were both arrested in April 2004 after staging a live sex show without a license at Tokyo's Members Club Rock, a "happening bar", or sex club. The two had sex in public, and it was supposedly being filmed, but the correct paperwork was not filed, resulting in their arrest. Mukai was later convicted for public indecency and sentenced to five months in prison, along with the club being forced to shut down.

== Other media ==
Mukai is best known in the West from Karl Taro Greenfeld's 1994 novel Speed Tribes where he appears as the thinly veiled character "Choco Bon-Bon" who is depicted as struggling with methamphetamine addiction.

Mukai played himself in Shungo Kaji's 1999 mainstream film about the adult video industry, Ekiben.

In 2008, in an interview for the April 10 issue of Spa! magazine, Mukai explains how having sex can develop muscles. Accompanied by photos of him and a young starlet, the article has him demonstrating several sex positions and telling how they can be used to get a free workout. His specialty is ekiben, where the couple has sex with the man standing while the woman wraps her arms around his neck. The key to muscular development, according to Mukai, is to support the woman by her thighs and use the arms to move her up and down.

== Championships and accomplishments ==
- Dramatic Dream Team
  - Ironman Heavymetalweight Championship (2 times)
- World Entertainment Wrestling
  - WEW 6-Man Tag Team Championship (3 times) – with Ricky Fuji and Flying Kid Ichihara (1), and Kodo Fuyuki and Kyoko Inoue (2)

== Sources ==
- "CHOCOBALL MUKAI". The Complete Index to World Film.
- "チョコボール向井 (Chokobōru Mukai)". JMDB (in Japanese).
- "チョコボール 向井 – Cyokobooru Mukai". 'Web I-dic' (Idol Dictionary) (in Japanese). Archived from the original on October 11, 2007.
