= Snctm (club) =

American night club and sex club

Coordinates: 34.0623°N 118.3991°W

- Snctm Logo
- Location: Beverly Hills, California, U.S.
- Owner: The Circle
- Type: Nightclub, sex club

Website
- snctm.com

Snctm is an American nightclub and sex club founded in 2013 in Beverly Hills, California. It was founded by Damon Lawner and modeled after the film Eyes Wide Shut. It has been called the world's most exclusive sex club. To join or attend an event a guest must complete an application and submit photos for approval. Men are required to pay approximately $2,000 to attend and do not need to be physically attractive, women are not required to pay but must be physically attractive. The ratio of women to men is typically 6 women to 1 man. Participants in the meetings are said to include prominent Hollywood personalities, musicians, entrepreneurs, politicians and other wealthy and influential individuals.

Snctm events are black-tie masquerade parties — male attendees are required to wear tuxedos and female attendees lingerie or cocktail dresses. The first events were held in a mansion near Playboy Mansion. Later, due to the popularity of its events, Snctm has started to hold meetings in other cities and has established branches in New York City, Moscow, Kyiv and Miami.

The annual cost of membership ranges from $12,500 to $35,000 per year. The more expensive Dominus membership offers access to special private events and is limited to 20 people. A lifetime membership can be purchased for $100,000 and a special membership can be purchased for $1 million, offering access to the “beating heart of SNCTM” with “incomparable privileges” and access to "every passion, simple or complex". This membership is limited to three people.

The club was the subject of the Showtime unscripted docuseries Naked SNCTM.

In 2023 Lawner disclosed that Hunter Biden had previously been a SNCTM member. Lawner, who had sold ownership of the club in 2019, was immediately banned for life for violating the club's rules against disclosing the identity of members.
