= Shungo =

- Gender: Male

Origin
- Origin: Japanese
- Meaning: Different meanings depending on the kanji used

Shungo (written: 峻吾, 峻護, 駿吾 or 俊吾) is a masculine Japanese given name. Notable people with the name include:

- Shungo Kaji (梶 俊吾; born 1961), Japanese pornographic film director, screenwriter and producer
- Shungo Oyama (大山 峻護; born 1974), Japanese mixed martial artist
- Shungo Sawada (沢田 駿吾; 1930–2006), Japanese jazz guitarist
- Shungo Tamashiro (玉城 峻吾; born 1991), Japanese footballer
