= Naked SNCTM =

American television series about sex club Snctm

- Starring: Damon Lawner; Osa Grekov
- Country of origin: United States
- Original language: English

Original release
- Network: Showtime
- Release: 2017

Naked SNCTM is a Showtime television docuseries about the Snctm sex club.
