= Happening bar =

Japanese sex club

A happening bar (ハプニングバー) or couple kissa (カップル喫茶, kappuru kissa) is a Japanese sex club. In both, prospective customers pass an initial vetting to become members, then pay an entrance fee to enter the club. The club will provide drinks at a bar (often for free), rooms for sex and typically shower facilities. Entrance for couples is limited to male-female couples and single women, while a happening bar will also allow single men to enter, although typically at a steep surcharge (as much as ¥25,000, whereas a woman might enter for free). Entry is denied to the underaged (under 20), male groups, drunk or intoxicated people and, in some establishments, foreigners.

Happening bars and couple kissas skirt Japanese prostitution laws by neither providing nor promising actual sex on premises, instead stressing that what may or may not happen is entirely up to customers. In a high-profile incident in 2004, after porn star and wrestler Chocoball Mukai advertised on his website that he would be performing, the happening bar "Rock" in Tokyo's Roppongi district was raided by police. Chocoball, who had been caught in the act with another porn star, was later convicted for public indecency and sentenced to a five-month jail term, and the club was forced to shut down.
