= Hot Entertainment =

Japanese pornographic film company

- Industry: Pornography
- Founded: March 1991
- Founder: Shungo Kaji
- Headquarters: Tokyo, Japan
- Key people: Shinsuke Kaji (梶 晋介), President
- Products: Pornographic films
- Website: http://hot-et.com/

Hot Entertainment (ホットエンターテイメント, Hotto Entāteimento) is a Japanese adult video (AV) production company which has its headquarters in Tokyo, Japan and specializes in works featuring amateur actresses in "reality" videos.

== Company information ==
Hot Entertainment was founded on March 29, 1991 by Shungo Kaji. The company is located in the Sasazuka district of Tokyo's fashionable Shibuya ward. Hot Entertainment produces about 10 new videos per month and the DMM website, the distribution arm for the Hokuto Corporation, had over 1250 DVDs listed as manufactured under the Hot Entertainment brand in September 2011. Hot Entertainment also produced and released the 1999 theatrical movie Ekiben directed by Shungo Kaji.

In 2005, the AV columnist for the AllAbout website, Kemuta Ōtsubo, singled out Hot Entertainment as the most interesting AV company of the year, noting that the company had the best track record for turnover in AV rental stores for 2003 and 2004 and had programs featured on TV. He also lauds the studio for producing future directorial talent including AV directors Masaaki Kai, Hideto Aki and Sabbath Horinaka.

The company operates its own website (hot-et.com) (created January 26, 2001) which offers information on new releases and a market for DVD sales.

=== Hot Entertainment AV Visual Arts Academy ===
In the Fall of 2007, Hot Entertainment set up a series of courses for people wanting to enter the adult video industry, under the name of Hot Entertainment AV Visual Arts Academy. A separate series of courses consisting of seven or eight 90-minute classes was available for a 200,000 yen (about $2000) fee for aspiring producers, directors and actors. Instructors at the Academy were Hot Entertainment founder Shungo Kaji, Naoki Fushimi (伏見直樹) and Kaoru Mizuki (水木薫). The curriculum for the directors' course included topics such as planning, themes, documentary versus dramatic works and whether videos should be based only on the actress. Salary scales are also mentioned, running from 8000–10,000 yen per day for extras and "soup men" to 50,000 yen for veteran actors and 100,000 to 300,000 yen for directors.

== Labels ==
In addition to Hot Entertainment, the company has also used the following labels:

- Cheery
- Kaji
- Masaaki Kai

== Directors ==
Directors who have worked for Hot Entertainment include:

- Masaaki Kai
- Shungo Kaji
- Gunji Kawasaki

== Actresses ==
Some of the actresses who have appeared in Hot Entertainment videos:

- Ren Hitomi
- Ayame Ikehata
- Yūka Ōsawa

- Riko Tachibana

== AV Grand Prix ==
Hot Entertainment was one of the 77 companies which submitted entries for the 2008 AV Grand Prix contest. Their nominee was the video 100 Person Nampa Battle of All Time (空前絶後の100人ナンパ大作戦, Kuuzenzetsugo no 100 nin nanpa dai sakusen) (labeled AVGP-031) with amateur actresses. The company also participated in the 2009 AV Grand Prix competition as well with the video Hot Thanksgiving: The Yakyuken Coliseum (HOT感謝祭 THE 野球拳COLISEUM, HOT Kansha sai THE yakyūken COLISEUM), labeled AVGP-142, and starring Yūka Ōsawa, Riku Shiina, Yūho Kitada, Saki Tsuji, Ren Hitomi and Hikari Aoyama.
