= Ekiben (film) =

- Theatrical release poster
- Directed by: Shungo Kaji
- Written by: Shungo Kaji
- Produced by: Shinsuke Kaji
- Starring: Shungo Kaji; Saki Shiratori
- Cinematography: Koichi Ishii
- Edited by: Naoki Kaneko
- Production company: Engine Film
- Distributed by: Hot Entertainment
- Release date: October 9, 1999 (Japan)
- Running time: 108 minutes
- Country: Japan
- Language: Japanese

Ekiben (Japanese: 駅弁), also known as Box Lunch, is a 1999 Japanese mock documentary film centering on the adult video (AV) industry which was written and directed by Shungo Kaji. Ekiben refers to a box lunch sold at train stations in Japan and it is also a slang term referring to a sexual position where the man remains standing while supporting the woman who faces him with her legs wrapped around his waist. This position is the "specialty" of the adult video actor Chocoball Mukai who appears in the film.

The movie stars Shungo Kaji, Saki Shiratori and Chocoball Mukai. It was released theatrically in Japan as an R-15 film on October 9, 1999, by Hot Entertainment. The film was screened in February 2000 at the Berlin International Film Market (part of the Berlin International Film Festival) and in March 2000 at the NatFilm Festival in Denmark.

Derek Elley, a critic for Variety, said the film could, with judicious editing and marketing, have a "brief specialized career." He called it inventive and funny, well-acted and observed, and also found Kaji's aspiration to be taken seriously as a director touching with "a curiously melancholic style of humor." The AllRovi entry described Ekiben as a "funny and oddly poignant film."

== Bibliography ==
- "Official Website".
- Ekiben at IMDb
- "駅弁 at the Japanese Movie Database" (in Japanese).
- "駅弁 at AllCinema" (in Japanese).
