= Sex club =

Establishment allowing sexual activity between members

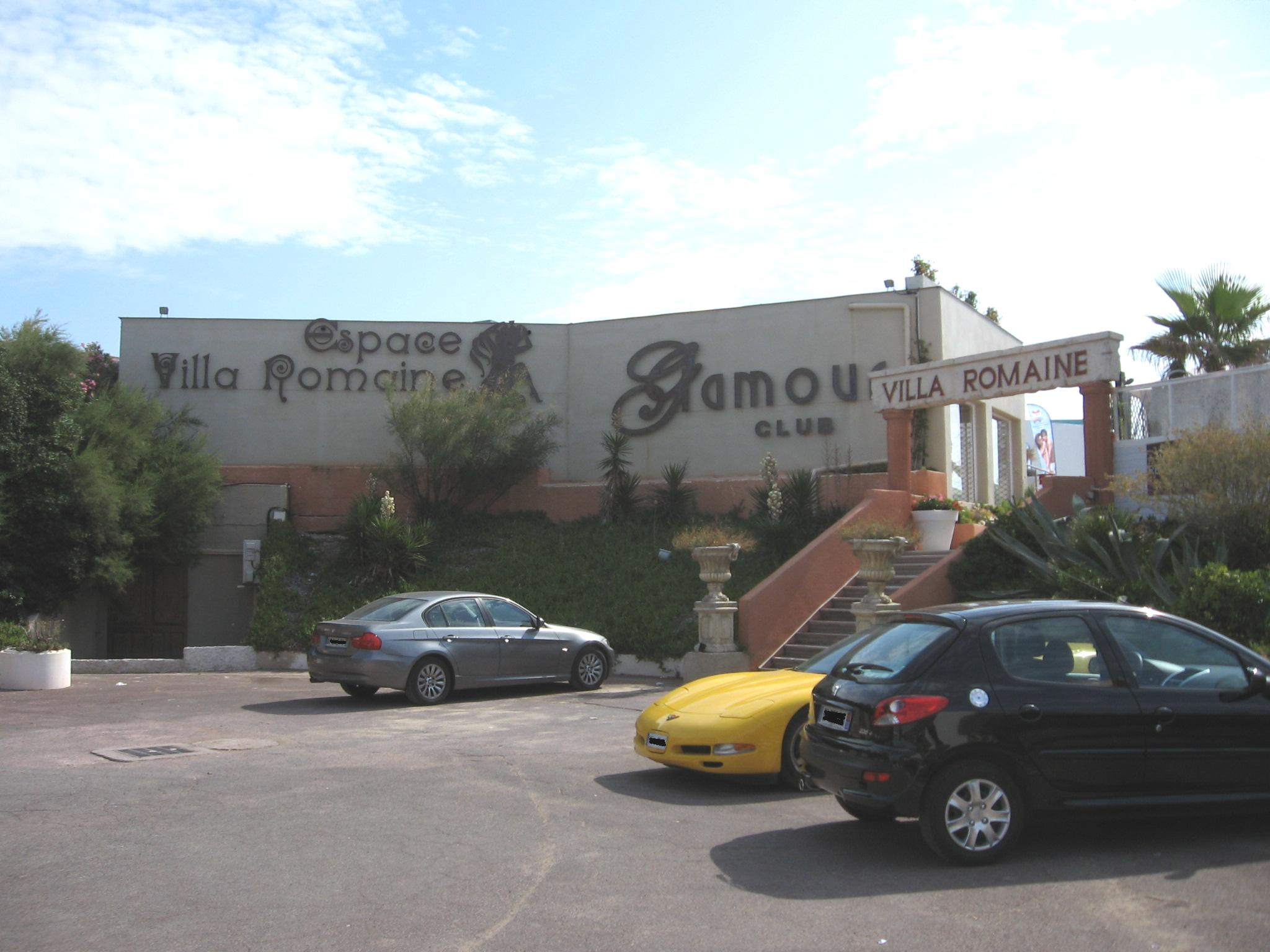
Swinger club Glamour, Cap d'Agde, France

Sex clubs, also known as swinger clubs or lifestyle clubs, are formal or informal groups that organize sex-related activities, or establishments where patrons can engage in sex acts with other patrons. A sex club or swinger club differs from a brothel in that while sex club patrons pay an entrance fee and may pay an annual membership fee, they only have an opportunity to have sex with other patrons, not with sex workers.

== Genres ==
A similar type of club is a masturbation club in which members, either single-gender or mixed, masturbate together in public or private rooms. Sexual intercourse is generally prohibited in such clubs.

There is also a very large and growing group of private sex clubs that, to avoid legal problems, do not operate in a specified location. These organizations focus on private parties in homes or rented facilities and make use of the Internet to build their membership. There is usually a small door fee and most are invitation-only. In addition to sexual orientation, these smaller groups often stratify on specific criteria, e.g., men with beards or those who are interested in BDSM and kinks. The first sex club of this type exclusively for African American gay men was Black Jack, started in 1986 by Alan Bell.

Many sex clubs have some form of online presence. Additionally, most adult dating and swinger social networks often provide listings of sex clubs, resorts and events. There is no non-profit impartial overarching organization of sex clubs per se, although NASCA International serves as an umbrella organization for swinging groups in general.

== Organizations ==
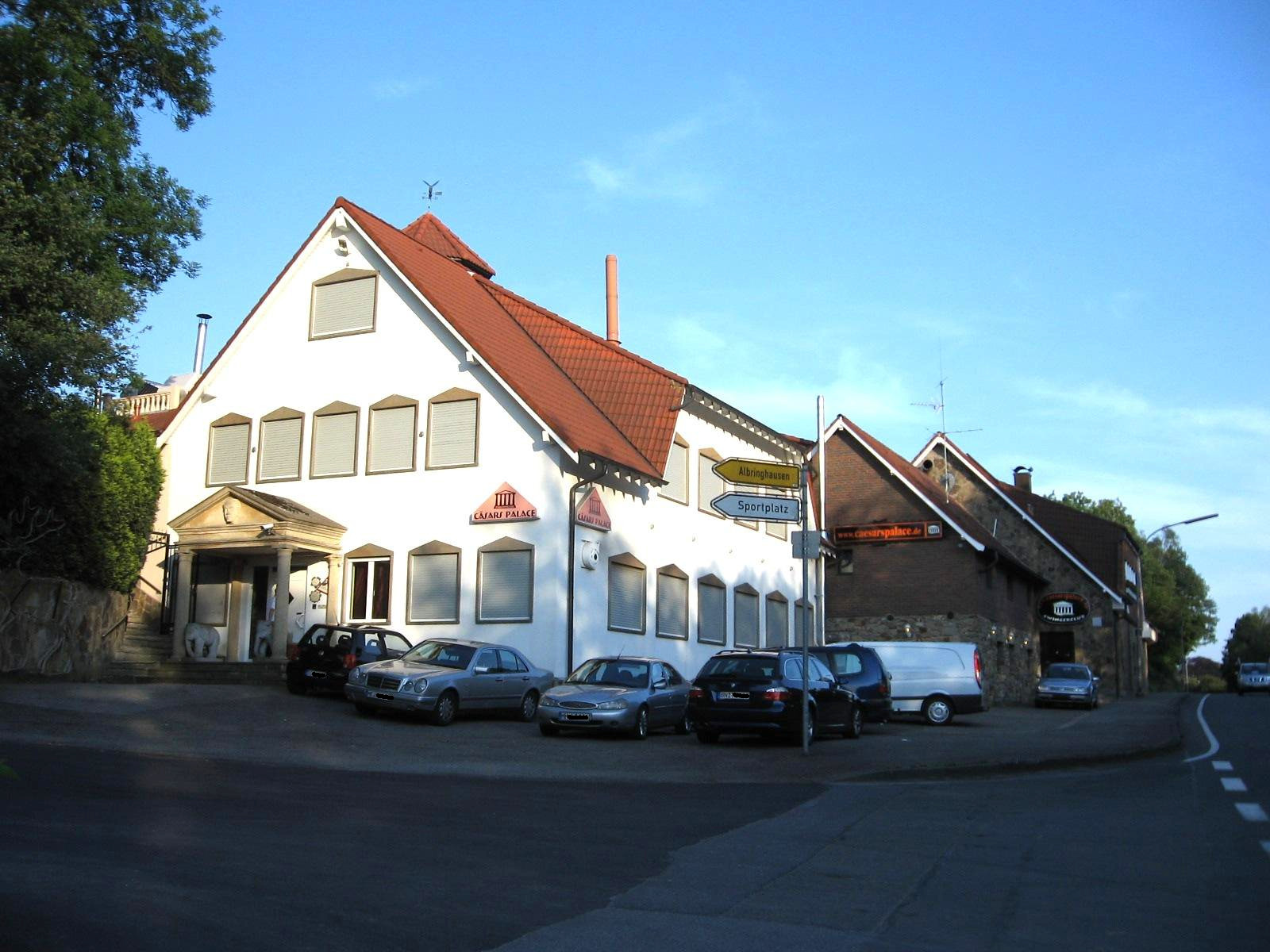
Swinger club Cäsars Palace, Sprockhövel, Germany

Most sex clubs cater to the swinging lifestyle. Most major cities in North America and Western Europe have sex clubs, many in a permanent location, but they often keep a low profile. Thousands of swinging clubs are listed on various adult websites and swinger social networks, but there are believed to be many other small neighborhood clubs, which are known among members of the lifestyle community, without a website. The rules of these clubs vary considerably, and admissions are not necessarily limited to married couples.

Most clubs are upscale and professional places that provide a safe place to meet other swingers. There are some differences however among clubs, and one should not confuse swinger clubs with social clubs, swinger groups or Meet-and-Greets. The easiest and simplest way to know the difference between swinger clubs and socials, groups or Meet-n-Greets is that swinger clubs are usually bricks-and-mortar physical locations where people meet other swingers. Socials, groups, and Meet-and-Greets may often meet in the same location, but it is often either a residence or some space that they have secured to meet. However, swinger clubs are typically permanent places that are specifically established for catering to swingers.

One of the biggest differences among clubs is the distinction between "On-Premises" and "Off-Premises" swinger clubs. On-Premises swingers lifestyle clubs are ones that offer rooms or areas that permit couples to engage in sex either alone or with others. Off-Premises clubs are ones that allow for couples to meet and often dance or can socialize, but have no areas or rooms where any sexual activity can occur. Larger establishments may include the facilities of an ordinary nightclub such as a bar and a dance floor. Each club sets the rules for activities which take place at club organized events. Some clubs organize events which cater to heterosexual couples or individuals, others to gay men or (rarely) lesbians, and others have no orientation policy. Some cater to non-conventional activities, such as gang bangs, BDSM or fetish.

Many swinger clubs will have a dozen or more rooms for sexual activity. The lifestyle clubs are also often decorated in themes, with furniture to match. Rooms may be decorated like a tropical oasis to Arabian Nights to caves to rooms with mirrors everywhere. Most clubs will also have voyeur rooms that have windows where patrons can engage in sex and know that they are being watched by other patrons of the club.

Some sex clubs have formal membership and requirements that can include membership fees, showing proof of identity, attending a formal orientation, possibly providing STI test results or showing that one is part of a stable, long-term relationship and is attending with that partner (intended to minimize the number of single males or cheating husbands). Other clubs are open to any person willing to pay an admission fee.

Sex clubs normally do not directly advertise to the general public, but typically rely on their own websites, swinger social networking, vertical integration in the adult entertainment industry, or through affiliate promotions on other adult venues. Many clubs, websites, publications, travel agencies, resorts, and events catering to the lifestyle promote each other to their mutual financial benefit but also with the altruistic intent of encouraging the dissemination of accurate information about the swinging lifestyle.

== Subgroups ==
=== Bisexuality and same-sex activity ===
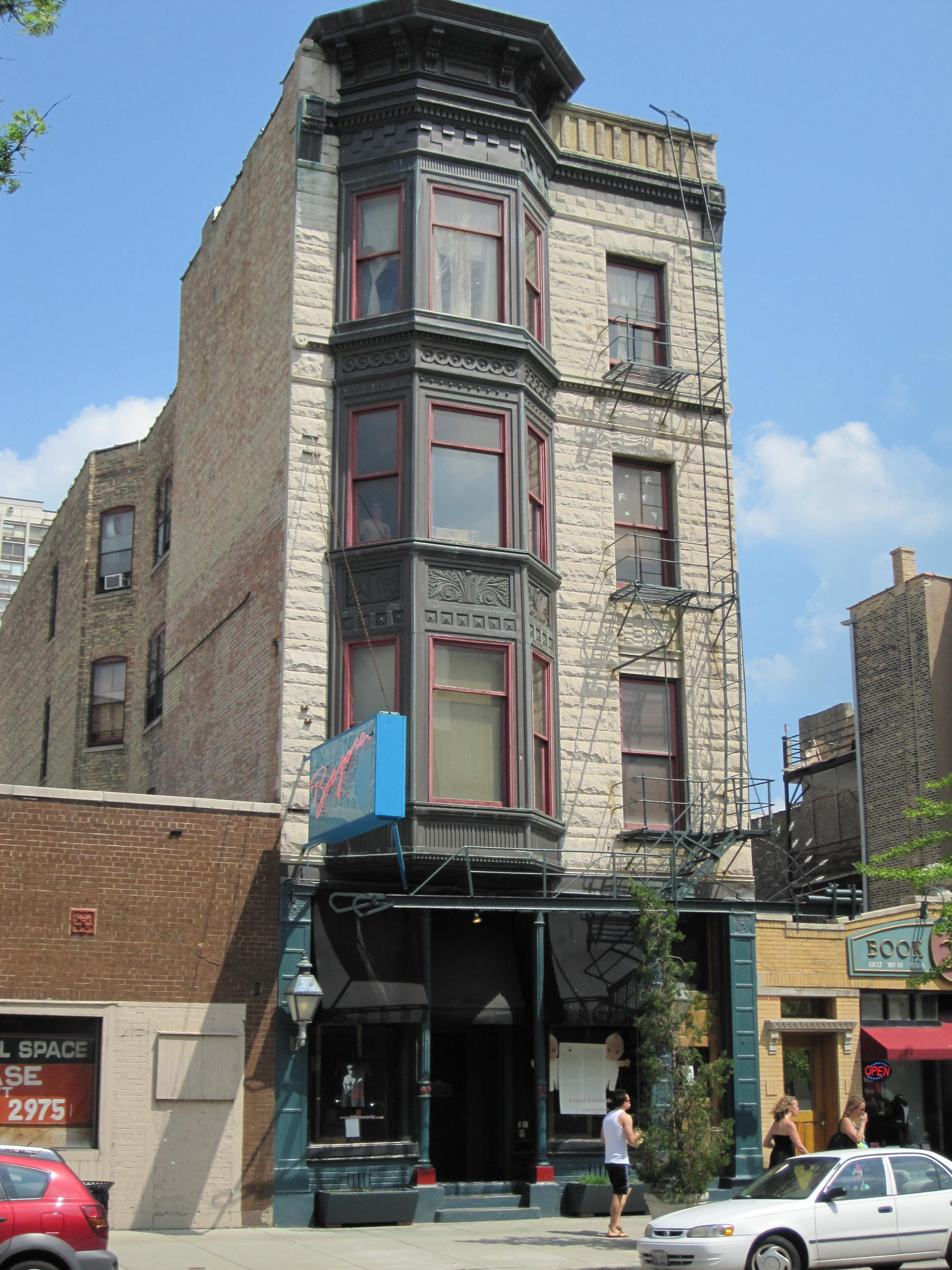
Bijou Theater, was a gay sex club in Chicago, Illinois

Attitudes to same-sex activity and bisexuality vary by culture and locale, and by gender.

Female bisexuality and bicuriosity are common in swinging and tend to be the norm among participants; Similarly, the online swinger site Swinger Social Network demonstrates that their female membership approximates a 50% population of bisexual females. By contrast, male same-sex activity is usually, though not always, unwelcome. One source, covering "Chicago's first and only all bisexual [club]", stated that in the founders' view "The [swinging] lifestyle is pretty homophobic" and "male bisexuality was erased", although an "underground market" existed. Swing clubs and other facilities exist for gay and bisexual interests in both genders, but differ – for example bathhouses for gay men, many of which were forced to close because of concerns over HIV transmission, whereas women's clubs are "comparatively rare" and tend to be organized as private events, or niche clubs with high popularity for their events.

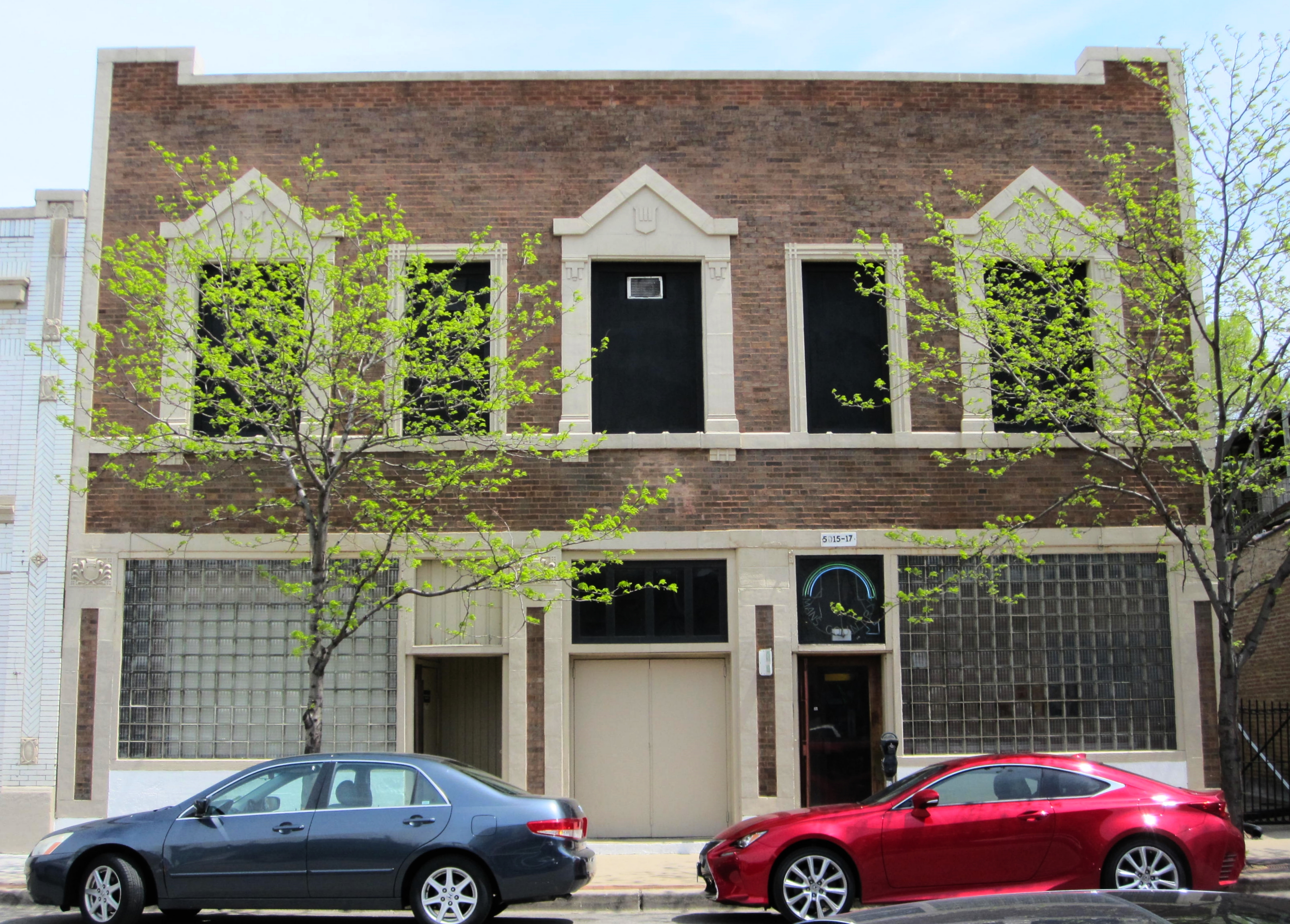
Man's Country, a gay bathhouse in Chicago, Illinois

=== Selective swinging ===
Most swingers' clubs do not bar entrance into their facilities based on race, national origin, physical appearance or age. The average swinger is married, professional, middle-class and in their 40s.

However, younger swingers seeking peer group options find this is not always possible at conventional swingers' clubs because of normal demographics. Similarly, those individuals who seek to specifically exclude others they personally view as unattractive are often disappointed at many swingers' clubs because the patrons are not screened to their standards. This desire by some has given rise to exclusive parties and clubs that exclude people based on looks or impose an upper age limit.

'Selective swinging' or 'urban swinging' events include mostly childless, unmarried young graduates whose average ages are as low as the late 20s, a group sometimes derided as "Ken and Barbie in the lifestyle" because of the emphasis on youth and physical attractiveness. Selective parties are often derided as "exclusive" or "elitist" by swingers who favor the open and accepting swinging culture.

== By region ==
=== United States ===
There are hundreds of sex clubs in the United States, ranging from ongoing house parties and meet-up groups to fully licensed businesses. It is estimated that there are over 3,000 swingers lifestyle clubs in North America. Since there is no relevant federal legislation, the legal requirements and legality of such establishments varies from state to state and even from locality to locality. Zoning laws regulating proximity to schools or religious buildings, local norms, and other factors have all played a role. Most sex clubs in the U.S. and Canada do not serve alcohol because of restrictive state requirements associated with a liquor license, but some allow customers to bring their own.

One of the first major "mainstream" sex/swinger clubs in the US was Plato's Retreat in NYC. It opened in 1977 and gained some notoriety because celebrities, porn stars, and well-to-do couples attended, but closed in 1985 during the HIV/AIDS public health crackdown on bathhouses.

=== Canada ===
A court ruling in 2005 decriminalizing private sex clubs in Canada has allowed many to open.

=== Germany ===
In Germany, there were around 340 swinger clubs listed in 2017.

=== UK ===
Swinging is popular in the UK, with upwards of 150 clubs in existence; these vary from specially designed premises to hotels and leisure clubs that have been adapted to the lifestyle. Some offer accommodation alongside food and beverage to complement the swinging experience. As well as clubs, the UK has many online special interest groups that focus on a particular fetish or aspect of a sexually liberated lifestyle; these groups often hold pop-up events in swingers clubs or private venues. Conservative estimates suggest that there are around 1 million swingers in Britain.

== See also ==
- Exhibitionism
- Fetish club
- Gay bathhouse
- Happening bar
- LGBTQ sex clubs
- List of universities with BDSM clubs
- Sex show
- Sex shop
- Strip club
- Swinging
