= Speed Tribes =

1994 book by Karl Taro Greenfeld

Speed Tribes: Days and Nights with Japan's Next Generation
- Author: Karl Taro Greenfeld
- Cover artist: Adrian Morgan / Red Letter Design, Dan Winters
- Subject: Japan
- Genre: Anthology
- Publisher: Harper Perennial
- Publication date: 1994
- Media type: Print
- Pages: 286
- ISBN: 978-0-06-092665-6

Speed Tribes: Days and Nights with Japan's Next Generation is a 1994 anthology book by Karl Taro Greenfeld. A collection of nonfiction short stories about the decadence and disaffection of urban Japanese Gen X youth during the early 1990s in the last years of the Bubble Economy, Speed Tribes was widely reviewed in international media.

== Summary ==
Each story in Speed Tribes focuses on the life of a specific Japanese youth in the aftermath of the Japanese asset price bubble collapse. Its subjects include a young Yakuza member, a nightclub hostess, an office girl, a motorcycle gangster, a hacker, an ultra-right-wing nationalist, and 'Choco Bon-Bon', a porn star. Popular 1990s rock band Zi:Kill appears in a chapter that documents the writer's time spent with the band and the events that nearly caused their break up.

Greenfeld wrote Speed Tribes while working as a reporter in Tokyo in the late 1980s and early 1990s. Speed Tribes is written in a literary style, and has been cited as an example of New Journalism. In interviews Greenfeld has freely admitted that many of the characters in Speed Tribes are not real individuals, and that the stories in Speed Tribes are a mixture of secondhand stories and original reporting.

== Reception ==
Writing for The New York Times, Alan Poul reviewed the book unfavorably, focusing on its "tough guy" language, inconsistent narrative choices, inaccurate descriptions, and an approach to reporting Japanese culture that reduced the stories to "simple, cynical morality plays". Dennis Romero of the Los Angeles Times criticized Speed Tribes for its "bad writing, shaky structure and strange characters," but favorably noted that "Greenfeld turns over the cold, hard stone of Japanese culture and finds life beneath." Kirkus Reviews called Speed Tribes a "tense and spicy read," but concluded that it was "dragged down by heavy-handed writing." In Japan Quarterly, Janet Goff noted "the uneven quality of the stories" but observed that the book added an important perspective on modern Japan. A review by Margaret Scott in Asian Wall Street Journal questioned Greenfeld's motives in writing the book, calling the author "shrewdly opportunistic" and summarizing the book as "pretentious pessimism".

Kodansha bought the Japanese translation rights to Speed Tribes shortly after publication, but a Japanese translation has never been published.
