= Karl Taro Greenfeld =

Journalist, novelist and television writer

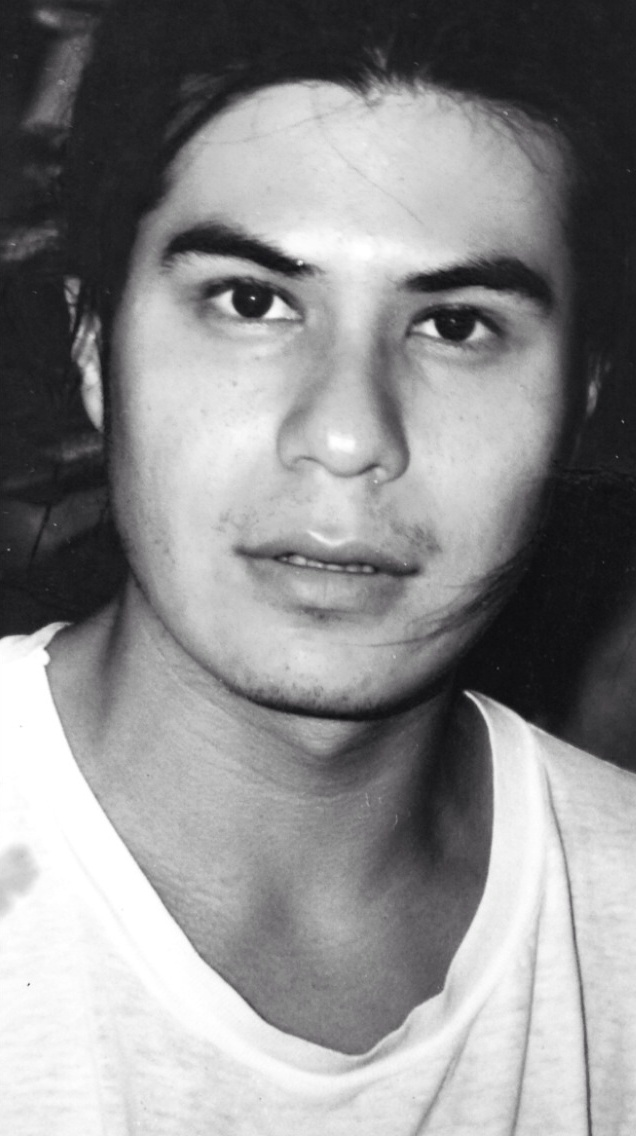
Karl Taro Greenfeld

Karl Taro Greenfeld (born 1965) is a journalist, novelist and television writer known primarily for his articles on life in modern Asia and both his fiction and non-fiction in The Paris Review.

== Early life and education ==
Born in Kobe, Japan, to a Japanese mother and a Jewish-American father, the writers Fumiko Kometani and Josh Greenfeld. Greenfeld grew up in Los Angeles and went to college in New York City, graduating from Sarah Lawrence in 1987.

== Career ==
Greenfeld served as an Assistant Language Teacher on the JET Programme in Japan from 1988 to 1989. A regular contributor to publications such as GQ, The Atlantic and Vogue, Greenfeld was the managing editor of Tokyo Journal before becoming the editor of Time Asia from 2002–2004 and editor-at-large at Sports Illustrated from 2004–2007. He was the Tokyo correspondent for The Nation. He is the author of three books about Asia: Speed Tribes: Days and Nights with Japan's Next Generation and Standard Deviations: Growing Up and Coming Down in the New Asia, and an account of the breakout of the SARS virus, China Syndrome: The True Story of the 21st Century's First Great Epidemic.

Greenfeld was greatly influenced by his parents, especially his father. In an interview, he said, "My dad was a huge influence in terms of what I think about writing, what has to be in a story, what has to be in a book. He's still a huge influence. When I wrote something well, he would make me feel really good. When I wrote something bad, he made me feel terrible. As a kid, it was most of my highs and lows—to the point that if the writing was really good, it almost excused weeks of bad behavior. He would forgive any transgression if I wrote a good story." His younger brother Noah was the subject of the elder Greenfeld's "Noah" trilogy of books (A Child Called Noah, A Place for Noah, and A Client Called Noah); these books also indirectly chronicle Greenfeld's childhood. In May 2009, Greenfeld published his own memoir of his years with Noah, Boy Alone: A Brother's Memoir.

His short stories have won the Pushcart Prize (2021), the Alice Hoffman Prize (2012) and O. Henry Prize (2012) and appeared in Best American Short Stories (2009 and 2013).

His novel Triburbia, about a group of families living in the Tribeca neighborhood of Manhattan, was published by Harper in July 2012. His novel The Subprimes about a woman who may or may not be the messiah, and the band of impoverished homeless Americans she comes to lead, was published by Harper in May 2015.

He has written for the Showtime drama Ray Donovan, the Netflix live action remake of Cowboy Bebop, and the HBO Max series Tokyo Vice. He is a Henry Crown Fellow of the Aspen Institute, and a Knight-Bagehott Fellow of Columbia University.

In 2025, he wrote about the destruction of his home during the Palisades Fire.

== Works ==
- TRUE. Little A. 2018. ISBN 978-1-5420-4684-8.
- The Subprimes. Harper. 2015. ISBN 978-0-06-213242-0.
- Dr. J: The Autobiography (w/ Julius Erving). Harper. 2013. ISBN 978-0-06-218792-5.
- Triburbia. Harper. 2012. ISBN 978-0-06-213239-0.
- NowTrends. Short Flight/Long Drive Books. 2011. ISBN 978-0-9825301-5-3.
- Boy Alone. Harper. 2009. ISBN 978-0-06-113667-2.
- China Syndrome. Harper. 2006. ISBN 978-0-06-058722-2.
- Standard Deviations. Random House. 2002. ISBN 978-0-8129-9269-4.
- Speed Tribes. Harper. 1994. ISBN 0-06-092665-1.
