= Shungo Kaji =

Japanese pornographic filmmaker (born 1961)

- Born: 1961 (age 64–65); Tokyo, Japan
- Occupations: Film director screenwriter film producer
- Years active: 1990 –
- Website: http://www.kaji-world.net

Shungo Kaji (梶俊吾, Kaji Shungo) (born 1961) is a Japanese film director, screenwriter, producer and company executive who is active primarily in the adult video (AV) field.

== Life and career ==
=== Nikkatsu and Hot Entertainment ===
Kaji was born in Tokyo, Japan in 1961. He says that he was interested in film from his early youth, and made 8mm movies as a student. After graduating from high school, he entered the Nikkatsu Visual Arts Academy (日活芸術学院, Nikkatsu Geijutsu Gakuin), a film school which was established in 1975 within the Nikkatsu studio.

He then joined the Nikkatsu company in a managerial role producing original films and videos. He eventually left Nikkatsu to pursue a career as an independent director. By at least late 1990, he was directing adult videos for the HRC Cher label, including The Female Teacher's Nightmare Trap 4. In November 1991, he directed Riria Yoshikawa's retirement video, Making love with my husband (her retirement), for HRC.

In March 1991, Kaji formed his own adult video studio, Hot Entertainment, and, by 2000, he was "a veteran director of over 150 adult films and videos." In addition to adult videos, Kaji directed the Hot Pictures V-Cinema production Nippon saikyou no seiyoku sha (日本最強の性欲者), which was released in October 1996 In July 1997, Kaji produced and Hot Entertainment released another V-Cinema title, Juvenile Crime (少年の犯罪, Shōnen no hanzai), starring Yumi Yoshiyuki and directed by Gunji Kawasaki, with a story based on a real murder case. A further V-Cinema work was the July 1999 horror video Short Horrors (ショートホラーズ, Shōto Horāzu), which Kaji wrote and directed.

Kaji received a measure of international celebrity with his 1999 partly autobiographical mock documentary Ekiben. The Variety review of the film called it "Consistently inventive, sometimes very funny and finally rather touching", while AllRovi commented that it was a "funny and oddly poignant film." He was also the executive producer for the Hot Entertainment March 2000 production of screenwriter Toshiyuki Morioka's debut as a director, Requiem of Darkness (クラヤミノレクイエム, Kurayami no rekuiemu).

In 2008, Kaji made news by being arrested by Tokyo police and charged with indecent exposure in a public place for filming an adult video in public on 20 July 2007. Actress Asahi Miura and five other staff members from Hot Entertainment were also arrested. The filming was being done in the back of a dump truck and police said that although the truck was partially covered, it could be seen into from surrounding buildings in Tokyo's Shibuya district.

=== Other activities ===
Kaji has also been involved in other business ventures, including the video production company Hot Pictures (ホットピクチャーズ, Hottopikuchāzu), the retailer Hot Powers (ホットパワーズ, Hottopawāzu) with shops and a website selling adult toys and sex aids, and Japan Entertainment Co. Ltd. (有限会社ジャパンエンターテイメント, Yuugen Kaisha Japan Entāteimento) In 2005, he established Tigermeisters (タイガーマイスターズ, Taigāmaisutāzu), a production company which specializes in adult videos featuring transsexual actresses, including AV Idols Miki Mizuasa and Hime Tsukino.

Kaji has also worked as a photographer and stylist, and, in January 2009, he published his first novel, entitled Shinya no teiou (深夜の帝王) (ISBN 4286045196).
