= Adult Film Association of America =

Association of Pornographic films in the US

- AFAA logo
- Abbreviation: AFAA
- Formation: 1969; 57 years ago
- Dissolved: 1992
- Type: Trade association
- Legal status: Merged with Free Speech Legal Defense Fund
- Purpose: Advocacy for the adult film industry, opposition to censorship, presentation of erotic movie awards
- Location: United States
- Members: 285 producers, distributors, theater owners, cable programmers, and videocassette manufacturers in the adult film business

The Adult Film Association of America (AFAA) was the first American association of pornographic film producers. It fought against censorship laws, attempted to defend the industry against prosecution for obscenity, and held an annual adult film awards ceremony. Founded in 1969, it continued separate operation until 1992 when it merged with Free Speech Legal Defense Fund. The organization was also host to the Erotic Film Awards which were held from 1977 until 1986.

== History ==
=== Origin, 1970s and 1980s ===
It was founded in 1969 in Kansas City, with Sam Chernoff of Astro-Jemco Film Co. as the first president. Other notable presidents included film producer David F. Friedman, elected the third president in 1971, and re-elected four times before becoming Chairman of the Board, and erotic actress and magazine publisher Gloria Leonard, who became president in 1986.

It held adult film awards ceremonies for 10 years during the Golden Age of Porn. The first awards ceremony was held July 14, 1977, at the Wilshire Ebell Theatre in Los Angeles while religious protesters picketed outside, as they would several years thereafter. "These feverish protesters are such a familiar part of the ritual, they really should be listed in the program," sex news magazine Cheri stated after the 1983 awards.

With the advent of pornography on video, in early 1986 the AFAA renamed itself Adult Film and Video Association of America (AFVAA) and added a new award category, best adult video. The 10th annual awards, held at the Sheraton Premiere Hotel in Los Angeles on June 29, 1986, were the last.

The association changed its name again in 1987 to the Adult Video Association (AVA). No awards were given for 1987. Instead, in mid-1988 they were replaced by an annual Night of the Stars dinner-dance and legal fundraiser, the fifth of which it held in June 1992 with more than 500 people in attendance, the association's biggest show ever. Lifetime Achievement Awards were presented at the Night of the Stars, however, film awards were discontinued.

=== 1990s ===
By February 1992, the tables were turned – association members "picketed the Public Forum on Pornography sponsored by religious groups who hope to institute morality codes back into all movies made."

In October 1992, Video Vixens Trading Cards for collectors were released with part of the profits going to the AVA. That same month, the AVA and Free Speech Legal Defense Fund, which had been organized in 1991, unified to create a new umbrella organization, the Free Speech Coalition (FSC). Its role as the trade association of the adult entertainment industry was taken over by the FSC, which acknowledges the AFAA as its first ancestor.

=== AFAA award history ===
Pornographic actress Marilyn Chambers presented the very first award for best erotic motion picture to the L. Sultana production of The Opening of Misty Beethoven, while runner-up was Count the Ways, produced by Virginia Ann Perry. Jennifer Welles and Jamie Gillis were the first winners in the best actress and best actor categories. Pornographic actor John Holmes told the crowd at the first year's awards, "In the not-too-far distant future we will proudly say that we were pioneers."

Retroactive awards of merit were also given to five movies considered best from 1955 to 1975: Tonight for Sure, Not Tonight, Henry! Trader Hornee and Sometime Sweet Susan. Deep Throat was also honored as one of the top-grossing of all movies, including mainstream films, of 1972. Board chairman Friedman said the AFAA was "much too busy fighting legal battles" in the early days to hold awards ceremonies, so these special awards were intended to make up for not having presented them in the past.

For a time the most notable erotic film awards were those of the AFAA, considered to be "the closest thing the porn world's got to filmdom's Oscar derby." Many stars would arrive in chauffeur-driven limousines while some would vie for attention by arriving in a four-horse carriage, a Roman chariot, a horse or even an elephant. The third annual awards "drew a festive crowd of some 600 porn-people plus several hundred hard-core fans to the Hollywood Palladium." Subsequent awards shows even attracted celebrities such as The Godfather director Francis Ford Coppola, singer Stephen Bishop and gonzo journalist Hunter S. Thompson to be part of the audience and comedian Jackie Gayle and singer Jaye P. Morgan of The Gong Show to be part of evening's entertainment. The fifth and eighth awards ceremonies were videotaped and offered to cable and subscription television and for sale on VHS cassettes while the seventh was taped for an August 1983 broadcast on Playboy TV. Other awards during the porno chic era included Adam Film World's X-Caliber awards, first given out in 1975 and based on votes of fans, Hustler magazine's Erotic Movie Awards, first presented in 1977 and the Critics Adult Film Awards, bestowed by a New York-based group of East Coast adult sex film critics from 1981 to 1987.

By the third awards ceremony in 1980, although the concept was seen as positive, adult entertainment magazine Genesis reported they were "beginning to generate as much controversy as the regular Academy Awards, or more." While it seemed "politicking" gave the Best Film award to Legend of Lady Blue over heavy favorites Sex World and Take Off, the "most glaring lack of any validity" was shown by giving the best actor award to Aldo Ray. "The Erotica Awards are supposed to be presented to sex-film performers who both 'act' well and 'perform' well. In Sweet Savage, not only did Aldo Ray not 'act' particularly well—his part was simply gratuitous...he never even performed at all. The fact is he never even took his clothes off, nor did he show up to receive his award." Aside from that, Sweet Savage was released "well into 1979" and the films nominated were supposed to have been released in 1978, leaving the impression the AFAA gave him the award to "capitalize on his name and to obtain more media coverage." Adam Film World Guide, however, reported the following year's awards, which were presented in July 1981, "covered films released from mid-1980 to the middle of '81", which could have meant Sweet Savage was eligible for awards in 1979 if the same time frame was considered. Meanwhile, Adam Film World noted Ray's award "was not surprising considering that one of the announced functions of the aFAA and its annual awards is to upgrade the image of the adult film industry in the public eye."

Originally the Erotica Awards were determined by vote of the "association's membership of more than 700 producers, distributors and theater operators." However, in later years the AFAA ceremony was increasingly accused of bias, with a "belief among some that the West Coast producers were controlling what films received the awards" after Amanda By Night was passed over for best film at the 1981 awards. Starting with the awards presented in 1982, the AFAA decided to appoint an independent jury of three persons not associated with the adult film industry to make the final choices from the five finalists in each category. Jurors subsequently included an assortment of men and women such as a sexologist, author Robert Rimmer and journalists such as Brendan Gill of The New Yorker and other publications including Daily Variety, Playboy, USA Today and the Los Angeles Herald Examiner.

However, criticism continued, especially for the best erotic scene victory of Virginia in 1984, which led to the founding of the X-Rated Critics Organization and its Heart-On Awards. The role of adult film awards has been mostly supplanted by the AVN Awards, which also launched in 1984.

=== Credo ===
The AFAA had a credo that "recognized the responsibilities of adult filmmakers to the general public": 1. That films of adult subject matter will be produced for and exhibited to adult audiences and that persons not of legal age will not be admitted. 2. That the definition of an "adult" is that designation set by the constituted authorities of the community but in no event any persons under the age of 18 years. 3. That we will produce and exhibit only films that are in conformity with the Free Speech Provisions of the Constitution of the United States of America. 4. That we will respect the privacy of the general public in our advertising and public displays. 5. That we in no manner will condone, produce or exhibit child pornography in any form.

== Erotic Film Awards ==
Erotic Film Awards
- Awarded for: Excellence in erotic film
- Sponsored by: Adult Film Association of America
- Location: Los Angeles, California
- Country: United States
- Presented by: Adult Film Association of America
- Hosted by: David F. Friedman
- Reward: Trophy
- First award: 1977
- Final award: 1986

Television/radio coverage
- Network: Playboy TV

The AFAA awards were called the Erotic Film Awards and the trophy, known as the Erotica Award, was a golden statuette "in the form of a shapely nude holding high a rampant spear in an obvious attitude of erotic excitement." Winners are shown below in the year the awards were presented:

=== Best Picture ===
Year	Award	Recipient
1977	Winner	The Opening of Misty Beethoven – L. Sultana
1977	Nominees	Count the Ways – Virginia Ann Perry, producer
1978	Winner	Desires Within Young Girls – Harold Lime, producer
1978	Nominees	
1979	Winner	Legend of Lady Blue – John Byron
1979	Nominees	Bad Penny, Candy Stripers, China Cat, Debbie Does Dallas, Deep Roots, Dirty Lilly, Erotic Adventures of Candy, Fiona on Fire, Girls of Pussycat Ranch, Hot Skin, Little Girls Blue, Little Orphan Dusty, Pretty Peaches, Sex World, Skin Flicks, Sweet Savage, Take Off, The Health Spa, The Other Side of Julie
1980	Winner	Babylon Pink – Cecil Howard
1980	Nominees	Easy, The Ecstasy Girls, Fantasy, Jack 'N' Jill, Pro Ball Cheerleaders
1981	Winners (tie)	Talk Dirty to Me – Jerry Ross; Urban Cowgirls – Cliff Stern & Laura Stevens, producers (Jet Productions)
1981	Nominees	Amanda By Night, Insatiable, The Budding of Brie
1982	Winner	Nothing to Hide – Bernardo Spinelli (Cal-Vista International)
1982	Finalists	Neon Nights – Cecil Howard, Outlaw Ladies – Ron Sullivan & Eldon Byrd, Games Women Play – Chuck Vincent, Skintight – Mike De. Weldon
1983	Winner	Roommates – Chuck Vincent & Bill Slibodian, producers (Platinum Pictures)
1983	Finalists	Body Talk – Tod Jonson, producer (Key Films); Foxtrot – Cecil Howard, producer (Command Cinema); Irresistible – Joe Steinman, executive producer (Essex Distributing); Undercovers – Anne Rhine, producer (Evolution Enterprises)
1984	Winner	The Devil in Miss Jones Part II – James George
1984	Finalists	Flesh and Laces, Part I and II – Hollywood International; Little Girls Lost – Ted Roter; Naughty Girls Need Love Too – Essex; Reel People – Richard Frazzini; Suzie Superstar – Cal Vista International; That's Outrageous – P.R.P. Inc.
1985	Winner	Dixie Ray, Hollywood Star – Billy Thornberg
1985	Finalists	Every Woman Has A Fantasy – Sandra Winters; Firestorm – Cecil Howard; L'amour – Marga Aulbach; Viva Vanessa – Nibo Films
1986	Winner	Taboo American Style (The Miniseries) – VCA
1986	Finalists	The Grafenberg Spot, Trashy Lady, Snake Eyes; New Wave Hookers

=== Best Adult Video ===
Year	Award	Recipient
1986	Winner	Dangerous Stuff – Cecil Howard (Command Video)
1986	Finalists	Angel's Revenge – Dick Miller; Black Throat – Gregory Dark; Erotic Zones, Part II – Caballero Control Corp.; The Woman In Pink – Essex

=== Best Actress ===
Year	Award	Recipient	Image
1977	Winner	Jennifer Welles – Little Orphan Sammy	Veronica Hart, winner of the 1983 Best Actress Erotica Award, at the 2002 AVN Adult Entertainment Expo
1977	Nominees	Annette Haven	Veronica Hart, winner of the 1983 Best Actress Erotica Award, at the 2002 AVN Adult Entertainment Expo
1978	Winner	Georgina Spelvin – Desires Within Young Girls	Veronica Hart, winner of the 1983 Best Actress Erotica Award, at the 2002 AVN Adult Entertainment Expo
1978	Nominees		Veronica Hart, winner of the 1983 Best Actress Erotica Award, at the 2002 AVN Adult Entertainment Expo
1979	Winner	Desireé Cousteau – Pretty Peaches	Veronica Hart, winner of the 1983 Best Actress Erotica Award, at the 2002 AVN Adult Entertainment Expo
1979	Nominees	Abigail Clayton – Health Spa, Carol Connors – Erotic Adventures of Candy, Samantha Fox – Bad Penny, Amber Hunt – Candy Stripers, Gloria Leonard – Maraschino Cherry, Sharon Mitchell – Skin Flicks, Tamara Morgan – Little Girls Blue, Rhonda Jo Petty – Little Orphan Dusty, Maurene Spring – Legend of Lady Blue, Serena – Hot Honey, Sharon Thorpe – Sex World, Bambi Woods – Debbie Does Dallas	Veronica Hart, winner of the 1983 Best Actress Erotica Award, at the 2002 AVN Adult Entertainment Expo
1980	Winner	Samantha Fox – Jack 'N' Jill	Veronica Hart, winner of the 1983 Best Actress Erotica Award, at the 2002 AVN Adult Entertainment Expo
1980	Nominees	Lesllie Bovee – Misbehavin', Gloria Leonard – All About Gloria Leonard, Candida Royalle – Proball Cheerleaders, Serena – Ecstasy Girls, Georgina Spelvin – For Richer For Poorer	Veronica Hart, winner of the 1983 Best Actress Erotica Award, at the 2002 AVN Adult Entertainment Expo
1981	Winner	Samantha Fox – This Lady Is A Tramp	Veronica Hart, winner of the 1983 Best Actress Erotica Award, at the 2002 AVN Adult Entertainment Expo
1981	Nominees		Veronica Hart, winner of the 1983 Best Actress Erotica Award, at the 2002 AVN Adult Entertainment Expo
1982	Winner	Georgina Spelvin – The Dancers	Veronica Hart, winner of the 1983 Best Actress Erotica Award, at the 2002 AVN Adult Entertainment Expo
1982	Finalists	Chelsea Manchester – Nothing To Hide; Annette Haven – nominated twice, for Wicked Sensations & Skintight; Mai Lin – Oriental Hawaii	Veronica Hart, winner of the 1983 Best Actress Erotica Award, at the 2002 AVN Adult Entertainment Expo
1983	Winner	Veronica Hart – Roommates	Veronica Hart, winner of the 1983 Best Actress Erotica Award, at the 2002 AVN Adult Entertainment Expo
1983	Finalists	Samantha Fox – Undercovers; Kelly Nichols – Roommates; Loni Sanders – Never So Deep; Marlene Willoughby – Foxtrot	Veronica Hart, winner of the 1983 Best Actress Erotica Award, at the 2002 AVN Adult Entertainment Expo
1984	Winner	Kelly Nichols – In Love	Veronica Hart, winner of the 1983 Best Actress Erotica Award, at the 2002 AVN Adult Entertainment Expo
1984	Finalists	Arlene Manhattan – Aphrodesia's Diary; Jessie St. James – Between Lovers; Georgina Spelvin – The Devil in Miss Jones Part II; Veronica Hart – Little Girls Lost; Shauna Grant – nominated twice, for Suzie Superstar & Virginia	Veronica Hart, winner of the 1983 Best Actress Erotica Award, at the 2002 AVN Adult Entertainment Expo
1985	Winner	Rachel Ashley – Every Woman Has A Fantasy	Veronica Hart, winner of the 1983 Best Actress Erotica Award, at the 2002 AVN Adult Entertainment Expo
1985	Finalists	Angel – L'amour; Lisa De Leeuw – Dixie Ray, Hollywood Star; Victoria Jackson – Firestorm; Kelly Nichols – Great Sexpectations	Veronica Hart, winner of the 1983 Best Actress Erotica Award, at the 2002 AVN Adult Entertainment Expo
1986	Winner	Gloria Leonard – Taboo American Style (The Miniseries)	Veronica Hart, winner of the 1983 Best Actress Erotica Award, at the 2002 AVN Adult Entertainment Expo
1986	Finalists	Tish Ambrose – Corporate Assets; Laurie Smith – Snake Eyes; Ginger Lynn – nominated twice, for The Grafenberg Spot & Trashy Lady	Veronica Hart, winner of the 1983 Best Actress Erotica Award, at the 2002 AVN Adult Entertainment Expo

=== Best Actor ===
Year	Award	Recipient	Image
1977	Winner	Jamie Gillis – The Opening of Misty Beethoven	John Leslie, four-time Best Actor Erotica Award winner, at the 2007 AVN Adult Entertainment Expo.
1977	Nominees	Harry Reems – Sex Wish; Tyler Horne; Carl Lacy; Ken Turner; John Holmes	John Leslie, four-time Best Actor Erotica Award winner, at the 2007 AVN Adult Entertainment Expo.
1978	Winner	Jamie Gillis – A Coming of Angels	John Leslie, four-time Best Actor Erotica Award winner, at the 2007 AVN Adult Entertainment Expo.
1978	Nominees		John Leslie, four-time Best Actor Erotica Award winner, at the 2007 AVN Adult Entertainment Expo.
1979	Winner	Aldo Ray – Sweet Savage	John Leslie, four-time Best Actor Erotica Award winner, at the 2007 AVN Adult Entertainment Expo.
1979	Nominees	Richard Bolla – Debbie Does Dallas, Jess Chana – Deep Roots, Joe Civera – Pretty Peaches, Eric Edwards – Girls of Pussycat Ranch, Don Fernando – Erotic Adventures of Candy, Robert Girard – Health Spa, John Holmes – China Cat, John Holmes – Erotic Adventures of Candy, John Holmes – Little Orphan Dusty, Tony Hudson – Skin Flicks, John Leslie – Sensual Encounter, John Leslie – Sex World, William Margold – Hot Skin, Wade Nichols – Take-Off	John Leslie, four-time Best Actor Erotica Award winner, at the 2007 AVN Adult Entertainment Expo.
1980	Winner	Jamie Gillis – The Ecstasy Girls	John Leslie, four-time Best Actor Erotica Award winner, at the 2007 AVN Adult Entertainment Expo.
1980	Nominees	John C. Holmes – Blonde Fire; John Leslie – Sensuous Detective; Turk Lyon – Proball Cheerleaders; Jack Wrangler – Jack 'N' Jill	John Leslie, four-time Best Actor Erotica Award winner, at the 2007 AVN Adult Entertainment Expo.
1981	Winner	John Leslie – Talk Dirty To Me	John Leslie, four-time Best Actor Erotica Award winner, at the 2007 AVN Adult Entertainment Expo.
1981	Nominees		John Leslie, four-time Best Actor Erotica Award winner, at the 2007 AVN Adult Entertainment Expo.
1982	Winner	John Leslie – Wicked Sensations	John Leslie, four-time Best Actor Erotica Award winner, at the 2007 AVN Adult Entertainment Expo.
1982	Finalists	Randy West – Country Comfort; Ron Jeremy – Bad Girls; John Leslie – also nominated for Nothing To Hide; Richard Bolla – Indecent Exposure	John Leslie, four-time Best Actor Erotica Award winner, at the 2007 AVN Adult Entertainment Expo.
1983	Winner	John Leslie – Talk Dirty To Me Part II	John Leslie, four-time Best Actor Erotica Award winner, at the 2007 AVN Adult Entertainment Expo.
1983	Finalists	Eric Edwards – Titillation; Richard Pacheco – Irresistible; Jake Teague – Foxtrot; Steven Tyler – Body Talk	John Leslie, four-time Best Actor Erotica Award winner, at the 2007 AVN Adult Entertainment Expo.
1984	Winner	Paul Thomas – Virginia	John Leslie, four-time Best Actor Erotica Award winner, at the 2007 AVN Adult Entertainment Expo.
1984	Finalists	Jack Wrangler – The Devil in Miss Jones Part II; Jamie Gillis – Flesh and Laces, Part I and II; Richard Pacheco – Naughty Girls Need Love Too; John Leslie – Suzie Superstar	John Leslie, four-time Best Actor Erotica Award winner, at the 2007 AVN Adult Entertainment Expo.
1985	Winner (tie)	John Leslie – tie with himself, for both Dixie Ray, Hollywood Star & Every Woman Has A Fantasy	John Leslie, four-time Best Actor Erotica Award winner, at the 2007 AVN Adult Entertainment Expo.
1985	Finalists	Tom Byron – Kinky Business; Eric Edwards – Firestorm; Harry Reems – L'amour	John Leslie, four-time Best Actor Erotica Award winner, at the 2007 AVN Adult Entertainment Expo.
1986	Winner	Jerry Butler – Snake Eyes	John Leslie, four-time Best Actor Erotica Award winner, at the 2007 AVN Adult Entertainment Expo.
1986	Finalists	Paul Thomas – Taboo American Style (The Miniseries); Eric Edwards – Corporate Assets; Harry Reems – Trashy Lady; Jamie Gillis – Girls On Fire	John Leslie, four-time Best Actor Erotica Award winner, at the 2007 AVN Adult Entertainment Expo.

=== Best Supporting Actress ===
Year	Award	Recipient
1977	Winner	Georgina Spelvin – Ping Pong
1977	Nominees	
1978	Winner	Annette Haven – A Coming of Angels
1978	Nominees	
1979	Winner	Georgina Spelvin – Take Off
1979	Nominees	Beth Anna – Skin Flicks, Lauria Cloud – Little Girls Blue, Carol Connors – Sweet Savage, Colene Davis – Skin Flicks, Annette Haven – Take-Off, Arcadia Lake – Girls of Pussycat Ranch, Gloria Leonard – Legend of Lady Blue, Molly Malone – Bad Penny, Pat Manning – Hot Skin, Kay Parker – Health Spa, Liz Renay – Deep Roots, Georgina Spelvin – Erotic Adventures of Candy, Sharon Thorpe – Candy Stripers, Eileen Wells – China Cat
1980	Winner	Georgina Spelvin – The Ecstasy Girls
1980	Nominees	Lisa De Leeuw – Proball Cheerleaders, Gloria Leonard – Misbehavin' , and Spelvin again in Easy & Fantasy
1981	Winner	Georgina Spelvin – Urban Cowgirls
1981	Nominees	Gloria Leonard, Jessie St. James, Juliet Anderson, Vanessa del Rio
1982	Winner	Holly McCall – Nothing To Hide
1982	Finalists	Jessie St. James – Oriental Hawaii; Merle Michaels – Outlaw Ladies; Lisa DeLeeuw – 8 to 4; Georgina Spelvin – Indecent Exposure
1983	Winner	Veronica Hart – Foxtrot
1983	Finalists	Sharon Mitchell – Blue Jeans; Jessie St. James – Casanova Part II; Kay Parker – nominated twice, for Body Talk & Taboo II
1984	Winner	Kay Parker – Sweet Young Foxes
1984	Finalists	Vanessa del Rio – Aphrodesia's Diary; Georgina Spelvin – Between Lovers; Samantha Fox – The Devil in Miss Jones Part II; Shauna Grant – Flesh and Laces, Part I and II; Anna Ventura – That's Outrageous
1985	Winner	Chelsea Blake – Great Sexpectations
1985	Finalists	Kelly Nichols, Ginger Lynn, Sharon Kane
1986	Winner	Lisa De Leeuw – Raw Talent
1986	Finalists	Annette Haven – The Grafenberg Spot; Colleen Brennan – Hyapatia Lee's The Ribald Tales of Canterbury; Ginger Lynn – Girls On Fire; Amber Lynn – Trashy Lady

=== Best Supporting Actor ===
Year	Award	Recipient	Image
1977	Winner	Carlos Tobalina – Tell Them Johnny Wadd Is Here	Ron Jeremy, two-time Best Supporting Actor Erotica Award winner, at the "Free Speech Coalition Awards Annual Bash Event", November 2009.
1977	Nominees		Ron Jeremy, two-time Best Supporting Actor Erotica Award winner, at the "Free Speech Coalition Awards Annual Bash Event", November 2009.
1978	Winner	John Leslie – A Coming of Angels	Ron Jeremy, two-time Best Supporting Actor Erotica Award winner, at the "Free Speech Coalition Awards Annual Bash Event", November 2009.
1978	Nominees		Ron Jeremy, two-time Best Supporting Actor Erotica Award winner, at the "Free Speech Coalition Awards Annual Bash Event", November 2009.
1979	Winners (tie)	Roger Caine – Bad Penny and John Seeman – Sweet Savage^{1}	Ron Jeremy, two-time Best Supporting Actor Erotica Award winner, at the "Free Speech Coalition Awards Annual Bash Event", November 2009.
1979	Nominees	Ed Canon – Erotic Adventures of Candy, Alan B. Colberg – Disco Lady, John Holmes – Hot Skin, Mike Ranger – Hot Skin, John Seeman – Health Spa	Ron Jeremy, two-time Best Supporting Actor Erotica Award winner, at the "Free Speech Coalition Awards Annual Bash Event", November 2009.
1980	Winner	Bobby Astyr – People	Ron Jeremy, two-time Best Supporting Actor Erotica Award winner, at the "Free Speech Coalition Awards Annual Bash Event", November 2009.
1980	Nominees	Jamie Gillis – Sensuous Detective, Frank Hollowell – Ecstasy Girls, John Seeman – Ms. Magnificent, Paul Thomas – Fantasy	Ron Jeremy, two-time Best Supporting Actor Erotica Award winner, at the "Free Speech Coalition Awards Annual Bash Event", November 2009.
1981	Winner	Richard Pacheco – Talk Dirty To Me	Ron Jeremy, two-time Best Supporting Actor Erotica Award winner, at the "Free Speech Coalition Awards Annual Bash Event", November 2009.
1981	Nominees	Jamie Gillis, John Leslie, Joey Silvera, Randy West	Ron Jeremy, two-time Best Supporting Actor Erotica Award winner, at the "Free Speech Coalition Awards Annual Bash Event", November 2009.
1982	Winners (tie)	Richard Bolla – Outlaw Ladies and Richard Pacheco – Nothing To Hide	Ron Jeremy, two-time Best Supporting Actor Erotica Award winner, at the "Free Speech Coalition Awards Annual Bash Event", November 2009.
1982	Finalists	John Leslie – Bad Girls; Paul Thomas – Wicked Sensations; Eric Edwards – Indecent Exposure	Ron Jeremy, two-time Best Supporting Actor Erotica Award winner, at the "Free Speech Coalition Awards Annual Bash Event", November 2009.
1983	Winner	Jamie Gillis – Roommates	Ron Jeremy, two-time Best Supporting Actor Erotica Award winner, at the "Free Speech Coalition Awards Annual Bash Event", November 2009.
1983	Finalists	R. Bolla – Foxtrot; Richard Pacheco – Never So Deep; John Regis – Undercovers; Randy West – The Mistress	Ron Jeremy, two-time Best Supporting Actor Erotica Award winner, at the "Free Speech Coalition Awards Annual Bash Event", November 2009.
1984	Winner	Ron Jeremy – Suzie Superstar	Ron Jeremy, two-time Best Supporting Actor Erotica Award winner, at the "Free Speech Coalition Awards Annual Bash Event", November 2009.
1984	Finalists	Eric Edwards – Bodies in Heat; R. Bolla – The Devil in Miss Jones Part II; John Leslie – Naughty Girls Need Love Too; Bill Margold – Sweet Alice; Billy Dee – Virginia	Ron Jeremy, two-time Best Supporting Actor Erotica Award winner, at the "Free Speech Coalition Awards Annual Bash Event", November 2009.
1985	Winner	Ron Jeremy – All The Way In	Ron Jeremy, two-time Best Supporting Actor Erotica Award winner, at the "Free Speech Coalition Awards Annual Bash Event", November 2009.
1985	Finalists		Ron Jeremy, two-time Best Supporting Actor Erotica Award winner, at the "Free Speech Coalition Awards Annual Bash Event", November 2009.
1986	Winner	John Leslie – Taboo IV	Ron Jeremy, two-time Best Supporting Actor Erotica Award winner, at the "Free Speech Coalition Awards Annual Bash Event", November 2009.
1986	Finalists	Jack Baker – New Wave Hookers; Dennis Duggan – Hyapatia Lee's The Ribald Tales of Canterbury; John C. Holmes – Girls on Fire; Rick Savage – Trashy Lady	Ron Jeremy, two-time Best Supporting Actor Erotica Award winner, at the "Free Speech Coalition Awards Annual Bash Event", November 2009.

=== Best Director ===
Year	Award	Recipient	Image
1977	Winner	Henry Paris – The Opening of Misty Beethoven	Pornographic film director Henri Pachard, three-time Best Director Erotica Award winner, at the 2006 Erotica Los Angeles convention.
1977	Nominees		Pornographic film director Henri Pachard, three-time Best Director Erotica Award winner, at the 2006 Erotica Los Angeles convention.
1978	Winner	Alex de Renzy – Baby Face	Pornographic film director Henri Pachard, three-time Best Director Erotica Award winner, at the 2006 Erotica Los Angeles convention.
1978	Nominees		Pornographic film director Henri Pachard, three-time Best Director Erotica Award winner, at the 2006 Erotica Los Angeles convention.
1979	Winner	Armand Weston – Take Off	Pornographic film director Henri Pachard, three-time Best Director Erotica Award winner, at the 2006 Erotica Los Angeles convention.
1979	Nominees	Beau Buchanan – Captain Lust, Bob Chinn – Candy Stripers, Bob Chinn – China Cat, Bob Chinn – Little Orphan Dusty, Jim Clark – Debbie Does Dallas, Gerard Damiano – Skin Flicks, Norm de Plume – Hot Skin, Alex deRenzy – Pretty Peaches, Claire Dia – Health Spa, A. Fabritzi – Legend of Lady Blue, Ja Jaacovi – Little Orphan Dusty, Gail Palmer – Erotic Adventures of Candy, Ann Perry – Sweet Savage, Anthony Spinelli – Sex World, Ken Schwartz – Fiona on Fire, Mark Ubell – Bad Penny, Mark Ubell – Dirty Lilly, Johanna Williams – Little Girls Blue	Pornographic film director Henri Pachard, three-time Best Director Erotica Award winner, at the 2006 Erotica Los Angeles convention.
1980	Winner	Henri Pachard – Babylon Pink	Pornographic film director Henri Pachard, three-time Best Director Erotica Award winner, at the 2006 Erotica Los Angeles convention.
1980	Nominees	Anthony Spinelli – Easy, Robert McCallum – Ecstasy Girls, Gerard Damiano – Fantasy, Jack Genero – Proball Cheerleaders	Pornographic film director Henri Pachard, three-time Best Director Erotica Award winner, at the 2006 Erotica Los Angeles convention.
1981	Winner	Tsanusdi – Urban Cowgirls	Pornographic film director Henri Pachard, three-time Best Director Erotica Award winner, at the 2006 Erotica Los Angeles convention.
1981	Nominees		Pornographic film director Henri Pachard, three-time Best Director Erotica Award winner, at the 2006 Erotica Los Angeles convention.
1982	Winner	Anthony Spinelli – Nothing To Hide	Pornographic film director Henri Pachard, three-time Best Director Erotica Award winner, at the 2006 Erotica Los Angeles convention.
1982	Finalists	Chuck Vincent – Games Women Play; Henri Pachard – Outlaw Ladies; Cecil Howard – Neon Nights; David I. Frazer & Svetlana – Bad Girls	Pornographic film director Henri Pachard, three-time Best Director Erotica Award winner, at the 2006 Erotica Los Angeles convention.
1983	Winner	Chuck Vincent – Roommates	Pornographic film director Henri Pachard, three-time Best Director Erotica Award winner, at the 2006 Erotica Los Angeles convention.
1983	Finalists	Gerard Damiano – Never So Deep; Cecil Howard – Foxtrot; Henri Pachard – Mascara; Ann Rhine – Undercovers	Pornographic film director Henri Pachard, three-time Best Director Erotica Award winner, at the 2006 Erotica Los Angeles convention.
1984	Winner	Henri Pachard – The Devil in Miss Jones Part II	Pornographic film director Henri Pachard, three-time Best Director Erotica Award winner, at the 2006 Erotica Los Angeles convention.
1984	Finalists	Troy Benny – Flesh and Laces, Part I and II; Ted Roter – Little Girls Lost; Anthony Spinelli – Reel People; Cecil Howard – Scoundrels; F. J. Lincoln – That's Outrageous; Vinnie Rossi – Too Much Too Soon; John Seeman – Virginia	Pornographic film director Henri Pachard, three-time Best Director Erotica Award winner, at the 2006 Erotica Los Angeles convention.
1985	Winner	Anthony Spinelli – Dixie Ray, Hollywood Star	Pornographic film director Henri Pachard, three-time Best Director Erotica Award winner, at the 2006 Erotica Los Angeles convention.
1985	Finalists	Cecil Howard – Firestorm; Henri Pachard – Great Sexpectations; Marga Aulbach & Jack Remy – L'amour; Paul Vatelli – Stiff Competition	Pornographic film director Henri Pachard, three-time Best Director Erotica Award winner, at the 2006 Erotica Los Angeles convention.
1986	Winner	Henri Pachard – Taboo American Style (The Miniseries)	Pornographic film director Henri Pachard, three-time Best Director Erotica Award winner, at the 2006 Erotica Los Angeles convention.
1986	Finalists	Cecil Howard – Snake Eyes; Mitchell brothers – The Grafenberg Spot; Steve Scott – Trashy Lady; Gregory Dark – New Wave Hookers	Pornographic film director Henri Pachard, three-time Best Director Erotica Award winner, at the 2006 Erotica Los Angeles convention.

=== Best Screenplay ===
Year	Award	Recipient
1977	Winner	The Opening of Misty Beethoven – Henry Paris
1977	Nominees	Portrait of a Seduction
1978	Winner	Desires Within Young Girls – Edward E. Paramore III & Ramsey Karson
1978	Nominees	
1979	Winner	Legend of Lady Blue – A. Fabritzi
1979	Nominees	Bad Penny – Billy S. Schaefer, Dirty Lilly – Mark Ubell, Erotic Adventures of Candy – Gail Palmer, Girls of Pussycat Ranch – John Christopher, Hot Skin – Art Funn / Tommy Rott, Little Girls Blue – William Dancer / Johanna Williams, Little Orphan Dusty – Ja Jaacovi, Sweet Savage – Ann Perry, Sex World – Dean Rogers / Anthony Spinelli, Take Off – Doria Price / Armand Weston, The Health Spa – Marlene Burns
1980	Winner	The Ecstasy Girls – Bill Aaron & Ted Paramore
1980	Nominees	Easy – Anthony Spinelli, Jack 'N' Jill – Billy S. Schaeffer, Misbehavin' – B. Slobodian/C. Vincent, Proball Cheerleaders – Jess Pearson
1981	Winner	The Budding of Brie – Dorris Borrow & Henri Pachard
1981	Nominees	
1982	Winner	The Dancers – Michael Ellis
1982	Finalists	Neon Nights – Anne Randall; Games Women Play – Chick Vincent & Jimmy James; Nothing to Hide – Michael Ellis; Outlaw Ladies – Henry Pachard
1983	Winner	Roommates – Chuck Vincent & Rick Marx
1983	Finalists	Body Talk – Avon Coe & Art Lester; Never So Deep – Paula & Gerard Damiano; Foxtrot – Anne Randall; Undercovers – Anne Rhine; I Like To Watch – Paul Vatelli
1984	Winner	In Love – Rick Marx & Chuck Vincent
1984	Finalists	The Devil in Miss Jones Part II – Henri Pachard & Ellie Howard; Little Girls Lost – Ted Roter; Scoundrels – Anne Randall; That's Outrageous – F. J. Lincoln
1985	Winner	Dixie Ray, Hollywood Star – Dean Rogers
1985	Finalists	
1986	Winner	Raw Talent – Joyce Snyder
1986	Finalists	Snake Eyes – Anne Randall; Taboo American Style (The Miniseries) – Henri Pachard & Rick Marx; Corporate Assets – Thomas Paine; Trashy Lady – Steve Scott & Will Kelly

=== Best Erotic Scene ===
Year	Award	Recipient
1984	Winner	Virginia – John Seeman, producer (the final scene with Paul Thomas & Shauna Grant was the one shown at the awards ceremony)
1984	Finalists	Aphrodesia's Diary – Serge Lincoln; Flesh and Laces, Part I and II – Hollywood International; Hot Dreams – Warren Evans; Reel People – Richard Frazzini; Sexcapades – David Stone; Suzie Superstar – Cal Vista International
1985	Winner	Firestorm – Cecil Howard (the "red scene" group grope with Victoria Jackson, George Payne, Sharon Kane & Michael Bruce)
1985	Finalists	Body Girls – Caribbean Films; Good Girl/Bad Girl; Stud Hunters – Suze Randall; Trinity Brown – Cal Vista International
1986	Winners (tie)	New Wave Hookers – Gregory Dark (the three-way scene with Ginger Lynn, Steve Powers & Tom Byron) and Passage Thru Pamela – Buncco, Inc. (the transsexual scene)
1986	Finalists	The Grafenberg Spot – Mitchell brothers; Snake Eyes – Cecil Howard; Too Good To Be True – Cottonwood Productions

=== Best Foreign Film ===
Year	Award	Recipient	Image
1977^{2}	Winner	Les félines (France) in French (a.k.a. The Felines) – Daniel Daërt (Rita Films)	France
1977^{2}	Nominees	No other nominees	France
1978	Winner	Bel Ami (Sweden) (a.k.a. For Men Only) – (Mature Films)	Sweden
1978	Nominees		Sweden
1979	Winner	Joy of Fooling Around (France) – Jack Matthews & Pierre DuBois (Cal Vista)	France
1979	Nominees		France
1980	Winner	Librianna, Bitch of the Black Sea (Russia)^{3} – (Evolution Enterprises)	Soviet Union
1980	Nominees	Sensational Janine – (Leisure Time Booking), Sex Roulette – (Leisure Time Booking)	Soviet Union
1981^{2}	Winner	Ta mej i dalen (Sweden) in Swedish (a.k.a. Practice Makes Perfect) – (Cal Vista)	Sweden
1981^{2}	Nominees		Sweden

=== Best Musical Score ===
Year	Award	Recipient
1977	Winner	Les félines – Vladimir Cosma
1977	Nominees	
1978	Winner	Seven Into Snowy – Mayloo Music^{4}
1978	Nominees	
1979	Winner	Sex World – Berry Lipman
1979	Nominees	Candy Stripers – Lonjon Productions, Deep Roots – David Bluefield / Marty Robbins, Erotic Adventures of Candy – Leo Dell, Legend of Lady Blue – Sleepy Shores, Little Orphan Dusty – John Howard, Skin Flicks – Gerard Damiano, Sweet Savage – Bill Loose / Mary Lou Music, Take Off – Elephant's Memory, The Health Spa – Bill Etra / Bud Snyder
1980	Winner	The Ecstasy Girls – Ronni Romanovitch
1980	Nominees	For Richer For Poorer – Gerard Damiano; Frat House – Sven Conrad; Libriana, Bitch of the Black Sea – Bob Freeman; Ms. Magnificent – Lon Jon; Telefantasy – Pacific Coast
1981	Winner	Amanda By Night – Ronny Romanovitch
1981	Nominees	
1982	Winner	Rhinestone Cowgirls – Randy Rivera
1982	Finalists	Outlaw Ladies – Jhana Productions; Nothing To Hide – Ronny Romanouvich; The Dancers – Chet Moore and Jim Moore; Beauty Pageant – Bob Lind; Bad Girls – Bill King
1983	Winner	Roommates – Jonathan Hannah
1983	Finalists	Body Talk – David Henry; Irresistible – Geoffrey Pekofsky; The Mistress – Ronny Romanovitch; I Like To Watch – 3 Bells West
1984	Winner	Suzie Superstar – Horizon
1984	Finalists	The Devil in Miss Jones Part II – Barry Levitt; Scoundrels – David Ogrin & Peter Lewis; That's Outrageous – Vern Carlson; Too Much Too Soon – Shamus Music
1985	Winner	Firestorm – Peter Lewis & David Ogrin
1985	Finalists	All The Way In; L'amour – Daniel Boules; Stud Hunters – George Michaelski; Dixie Ray, Hollywood Star – Daryll Keen
1986	Winner	New Wave Hookers – The Plugz
1986	Finalists	Hyapatia Lee's The Ribald Tales of Canterbury – Lexi Hunter; Squalor Motel – Slavin

=== Best Song ===
Year	Award	Recipient
1977	Winner	"Sammy — Fast and Slow" from Little Orphan Sammy – Dave Wolff & Art Resnick
1977	Nominees	
1978	Winner	"Once Upon a Dream" from Seven Into Snowy – Antonio Shepherd
1978	Nominees	
1979	Winner	"Take Off" from Take Off – Elephant's Memory
1979	Nominees	"It Hurts" from Candy Stripers; "Six Tits In A Row" from Chorus Call; "Lonely Without You" from Deep Roots; "Long Long After I'm Gone" from Disco Lady; "Candy" from Erotic Adventures of Candy; "The Ranch Hand" from Girls of Pussycat Ranch; "Skin" from Hot Skin; "Little Blue Box" from Little Blue Box; "Sex World" from Sex World
1980	Winner	"This Time We Might Make It" from The Ecstasy Girls – Ronni Romanovitch
1980	Nominees	"Leonard's Theme" from All About Gloria Leonard; "One Page of Love" from Two Sisters; "Small Town Girls" from Small Town Girls
1981	Winner	Title song from Vista Valley PTA – Ben Dorsett
1981	Nominees	
1982	Winner	"Glory Bound" from Rhinestone Cowgirls – Randy Rivera
1982	Finalists	"Saran Lakes" from Outlaw Ladies; "Nothing To Lose" from Nothing To Hide; "8 To 4" theme from 8 To 4; "Neon Nights" theme from Neon Nights; "Beautiful Forever" from Centerfold Fever
1983	Winners (tie)	"Foxtrot" from Foxtrot and "With You" from Roommates^{5}
1983	Finalists	"Undercover Man" from Undercovers; "Dirty Talk" from Talk Dirty To Me II; "Never Love a Single Man" from The Mistress
1984	Winner	"If I Love You Tonight" from Suzie Superstar
1984	Finalists	"Sexy Faces" from Flesh and Laces, Part I and II; "It's Just The Devil In Miss Jones" from The Devil in Miss Jones Part II; "Little Girls Lost" from Little Girls Lost; "That First Love" from In Love; "A Woman In Love" from Between Lovers; "The Young Like It Hot" from The Young Like It Hot; "Outrageous" from That's Outrageous
1985	Winner	"Firestorm Theme" from Firestorm
1985	Finalists	"Body Girls Theme" from Body Girls; "Girls Just Want To" from Girls Just Want To...; "Letting Go" from Lady Dynamite; "L'amour" from L'amour
1986	Winner	"Electrify Me" from New Wave Hookers – Dark Brothers
1986	Finalists	"Country Boy" from Too Good To Be True; "Roll Me Over" from The Grafenberg Spot; "Reggae Theme Song" from Raw Talent; "The Ribald Tales of Canterbury" from Hyapatia Lee's The Ribald Tales of Canterbury – Lexi Hunter

=== Best Art and Set Decoration ===
Year	Award	Recipient
1977	Winner	Les félines – Andre Gillette
1977	Nominees	
1978	Winner	Desires Within Young Girls – Brent Barrydown
1978	Nominees	
1979^{6}	Winner	Sex World – Bill Wolf
1979^{6}	Nominees	Candy Stripers – Bill Wolf, Captain Lust – Beau Buchanan, Erotic Adventures of Candy – Bill Wolf, Health Spa – Frank Lillian, Legend of Lady Blue – Ektoe Carranza, Girls of Pussycat Ranch – John Christopher, Skin Flicks – P.R.P., Sweet Savage – Ann Perry, Take Off – Armand Weston
1980^{6}	Winner	The Ecstasy Girls – Valdesta
1980^{6}	Nominees	All About Gloria Leonard – Howard A. Howard; Fantasy – P. Reisenwitz/G. Damiano; For Richer For Poorer – Gerard Damiano; Small Town Girls – Ektor Carranza
1981	Winner	Urban Cowgirls – Ektor Carranza
1981	Nominees	
1982	Winner	Pandora's Mirror – Maria Ranoldi
1982	Finalists	Outlaw Ladies – Eddie Heath; Games Women Play – Pat Finnegan; Bad Girls – Svetlana; Nothing To Hide – B. C. Lewis & Marti Maxwell; Oriental Hawaii – Eddie Duncan
1983	Winner	Café Flesh – Paul Berthell/Steve Sayadian
1983	Finalists	Body Talk – Avon Coe & Art Lester; Blonde Goddess – Bill Eagle; Casanova Part II – Maria Pia Tobalina; Foxtrot – Oslak Vabo & Anne Randall
1984	Winner	...In The Pink – Andre Nichipolodas
1984	Finalists	The Devil in Miss Jones Part II – Eddie Heath; Scoundrels – Lynn Jefferies; Suzie Superstar – Robert McCallum; Virginia – Karen Fields
1985	Winner	Dixie Ray, Hollywood Star – Brian Costales
1985	Finalists	
1986	Winner	Dames – Jules Burke
1986	Finalists	Trashy Lady – Steve Scott; Hyapatia Lee's The Ribald Tales of Canterbury – Redi-Set; New Wave Hookers – Pez. D. Spenser; Squalor Motel – Michelle Seffman

=== Best Cinematography ===
Year	Award	Recipient
1977	Winner	Femmes de Sade – Alex de Renzy
1977	Nominees	
1978	Winner	Baby Face – Alex de Renzy
1978	Nominees	
1979	Winner	Take Off – Joao Fernandez
1979	Nominees	Captain Lust – Beau Buchanan, Erotic Adventures of Candy – Bob Max, Hot Skin – Norm de Plume, Legend of Lady Blue – Vilmos Vasquez, Little Blue Box – Pierre Schwartz II, Little Girls Blue – Max Roberts, Pretty Peaches – Alex de Renzy, Sweet Savage – Jack Durson, The Health Spa – Lazlo Crovney
1980	Winner	The Ecstasy Girls – Mike Stryker
1980	Nominees	Fantasy – Harry Flecks, Jack 'N' Jill – Larry Revine, People – J. Fernandes/J. McCalmont, Proball Cheerleaders – Jack Genero
1981	Winner	Urban Cowgirls – Ken Gibb
1981	Nominees	
1982	Winners (tie)	Games Women Play – Larry Revene and Nothing To Hide – Jack Remy
1982	Finalists	Skintight – Mike Stryker; Outlaw Ladies – Leroy Reoene; Bad Girls – Jean Petrov; Oriental Hawaii – Carlos Tobalina
1983	Winner	Foxtrot – Felix Daniels & Charles K. White
1983	Finalists	Never So Deep – Harry Flex; Roommates – Larry Revene; Casanova Part II – Carlos Tobalina; I Like To Watch – Paul G. Vatelli
1984	Winner	Virginia – Rahn Vickery
1984	Finalists	Aphrodesia's Diary – Gerard Loubeau; The Devil in Miss Jones Part II – Larry Revene; Flesh and Laces, Part I and II – Carlos Tobalina; Glitter – Roberta Findlay; Suzie Superstar – Robert McCallum
1985	Winner	Dixie Ray, Hollywood Star – Fred Andes
1985	Finalists	
1986	Winner	Trashy Lady – Tom Howard
1986	Finalists	Snake Eyes – Sven Nuvo; The Grafenberg Spot – Jon Fontana; Beverly Hills Exposed – Robert McCallum; New Wave Hookers – Jr. "Speedy" Bodden

=== Best Costume Design ===
Year	Award	Recipient
1977	Winner	Femmes de Sade – Carol Maniscalco
1977	Nominees	No other nominees
1978	Winner	Baby Face – Carol Maniscalo
1978	Nominees	
1979	Winner	Take Off – Alexis Blassini
1979	Nominees	Candy Stripers, Captain Lust, Erotic Adventures of Candy, Health Spa, Little Girls Blue, Pretty Peaches, Star Babe, Sweet Savage
1980	Winner	Chopstix, the Motion Picture – Foreign Delights
1980	Nominees	Ecstasy Girls – Valdesta; Libriana, Bitch of the Black Sea – Pezda Vanutcka; Ms. Magnificent – Debbie Shine; Proball Cheerleaders – Marie Christie
1981	Winner	Urban Cowgirls – Cheree Eastmore
1981	Nominees	
1982	Winner	Country Comfort – Sarah Yesko
1982	Finalists	Games Women Play – Eddie Heath; Oriental Hawaii – Maria Pia Tobalina; Bad Girls – Cindy Matzker; Pandora's Mirror – Renata Ranoldi
1983	Winner	1001 Erotic Nights – Victoria Donne
1983	Finalists	Café Flesh – Polly Ester; Blue Jeans – Fran Schifrin & Guiliana Schnitzler; Irresistible – Debbie Shine; Casanova Part II – Maria Pia Tobalina
1984	Winner	The Devil in Miss Jones Part II – Eddie Heath
1984	Finalists	Between Lovers – Raynor Shine; Scoundrels – Lynn Jefferies; Suzie Superstar – Enjoy Costumes
1985	Winner	Sexorama – Dani Morrison
1985	Finalists	
1986	Winner	Dames – Raynor Shine
1986	Finalists	Bordello – Eddy Heath; Hyapatia Lee's The Ribald Tales of Canterbury – Sheri Eastmore; New Wave Hookers – Gregory Dark & John D. Arc; Trashy Lady – Arley

=== Best Editing ===
Year	Award	Recipient
1977	Winner	The Opening of Misty Beethoven – Henry Paris
1977	Nominees	
1978	Winner	Baby Face – Richard Chasen & Bill Westwick
1978	Nominees	
1979	Winner	Legend of Lady Blue – Vilmos Vasquez & Michael Zen
1979	Nominees	Bad Penny – Martha Ubell, China Cat – Jeffrey Neal, Deep Roots – Lesa Lee, Erotic Adventures of Candy – Joe Diamond, Here Comes the Bride – John Christopher, Hot Skin – Norm de Plume, Little Girls Blue – Johanna Williams, Pretty Peaches – Bill Westwick, Sensual Encounters – Terri Chiappi, Sex World – Bill Christian / Terrence O'Donnell, The Health Spa – Evor G. Sib
1980	Winner	Jack 'N' Jill – Martha Ubell
1980	Nominees	Chopstix – Mason Girard; Ecstasy Girls – Terrance O'Riely; Fantasy – P. Riesenwitz/G. Damiano; Misbehavin' – Chuck Vincent; Proball Cheerleaders – Cine Enterprises
1981	Winner	Talk Dirty To Me – Tim McDonald
1981	Nominees	
1982	Winner	Outlaw Ladies – Arlo Schiffin
1982	Finalists	Nothing to Hide – Terrance O' Reilly; Games Women Play – James Macreading; Bad Girls – David I. Frazer; Skintight – Hayes Dupree
1983	Winner	Roommates – James Macreading
1983	Finalists	Never So Deep – Paula & Gerard Damiano; Talk Dirty To Me II – Tim McDonald; The Mistress – Terrance O'Reilly; Café Flesh – Snowflake Films; Foxtrot – Oslak Vabo
1984	Winners (tie)	The Devil in Miss Jones Part II – Ted Ryan and Virginia – Farouk Ibenson & Skip Mason
1984	Finalists	Flesh and Laces, Parts I and II – Rob Freeman & Alberto Soria; Glitter – Roberta Findlay; Too Much Too Soon – Snowflake Films
1985	Winner	Dixie Ray, Hollywood Star – Peter Stootsberry & Frank A. Coe
1985	Finalists	
1986	Winners (tie)	Taboo American Style (The Miniseries) – Jim McReading and Snake Eyes – Oslak Vabo
1986	Finalists	Trashy Lady – Steve Scott; Passion Pit – Michele M. Bale; The Adventures of Rick Quick – Kristin Leavenworth

=== Best Trailer ===
Year	Award	Recipient
1977	Winner	Little Orphan Sammy – D. W. Productions
1977	Nominees	The Double Exposure of Holly – Ronan O'Casey
1978	Winner	Baby Face – Alex de Renzy
1978	Nominees	
1979	Winner	Little Girls Blue – Johanna Williams
1979	Nominees	Candy Stripers, China Cat, Chorus Call, Debbie Does Dallas, Dirty Lilly, Deep Roots, Erotic Adventures of Candy, Health Spa, Legend of Lady Blue, Little Blue Box, Little Orphan Dusty, Sensual Encounter, Skin Flicks
1980	Winner	Easy – Terry Chiappe, Cal Vista
1980	Nominees	Ecstasy Girls – Terrance O'Riely, Fantasy – P.R.P., Frat House – Richard Aldrich, Jack 'N' Jill – Chuck Vincent, Proball Cheerleaders – Jack Genero
1981	Winner	Vista Valley PTA – Cal Vista
1981	Nominees	
1982	Winners (tie)	Skintight – Hayes Dupree and The Dancers – Terrance O'Reilly
1982	Finalists	Neon Nights – Cecil Howard; Bad Girls – David I. Frazer & Svetlana; Games Women Play – James Macreading
1983	Winners (tie)	Foxtrot – Oslak Vabo, Anne Randall & Cecil Howard; Never So Deep – Paula & Gerard Damiano
1983	Finalists	Body Talk – Diamond Cutting; Erotic Adventures of Lolita – John Donnally; Roommates – James Macreading
1984	Winner	Virginia – Farouk Ibenson & Lynn Elaine
1984	Finalists	Flesh and Laces, Part I and II – Bob Freeman & Alberto Soria; Reel People – Terrance O'Reilly; Suzie Superstar – Sam Norrell; That's Outrageous – Jack Baker; Too Much Too Soon – Snowflake Films
1985	Winner	Firestorm
1985	Finalists	
1986	Winner	New Wave Hookers – Gregory Dark & Jane Waters
1986	Finalists	Snake Eyes – Oslak Vabo; Girls On Fire – Barry Cleve; Passion Pit – Michele M. Bale; Passage Thru Pamela – Firth Demule; Beverly Hills Exposed – Terrance O'Reilly

=== Best Advertising Campaign ===
Year	Award	Recipient
1977	Winner	Les félines – Nancy B. Grant
1977	Nominees	The Double Exposure of Holly – Ronan O'Casey
1978	Winner	Eruption – Chet Collom
1978	Nominees	
1979	Winner	Pretty Peaches – Les Natali
1979	Nominees	Debbie Does Dallas, Deep Roots, Erotic Adventures of Candy, Girls of Pussycat Ranch, Here Comes the Bride, Legend of Lady Blue, Little Blue Box, Little Orphan Dusty, Sensual Encounter, Sweet Dreams of Mona Q, The Health Spa, The Other Side of Julie
1980	Winner	Babylon Pink – Win-Van
1980	Nominees	All About Gloria Leonard – F. A. Davidson, Easy – Chet Collom, Ecstasy Girls – Sampson & Cramer, Jack 'N' Jill – Frank Csoka, Proball Cheerleaders – Chet Collom
1981	Winner	Vista Valley PTA – Chet Collom
1981	Nominees	
1982	Winner	Nothing To Hide – Jimmie Johnson
1982	Finalists	Bad Girls – Svetlana; Neon Nights – Cecil Howard; Games Women Play – Jim Johnson & Penelope Gottlieb; Oriental Hawaii – Maria Pia Tobalina
1983	Winner	Body Talk – Nancy Villigran
1983	Finalists	Foxtrot – Cecil Howard; Erotic Adventures of Lolita – Jimmy Johnson; I Like To Watch – Berson Lewis; Roommates – Shorelane Benet Advertising
1984	Winner	Virginia – Walnut Advertising
1984	Finalists	Aphrodesia's Diary – Sampson Advertising; Bodies In Heat – Chet Collom; Scoundrels – Cecil Howard; Suzie Superstar – Jim Houston and Associates; Walnut Advertising was also nominated for Little Girls Lost & Reel People
1985	Winner	L'Amour – Marga Aulbach & Debbie Rubio
1985	Finalists	
1986	Winner	Girls on Fire – Walnut Advertising & Murray Perlstein
1986	Finalists	New Wave Hookers – Cynthia Patterson; Pleasures of Innocence – Walnut Advertising; Marianne Burton was nominated twice for Passion Pit & Sex Crimes 2084

=== Special awards ===
Year	Award	Recipient	Image
1977	Deep Throat Award	Plymouth Films, producers of Deep Throat, for its box-office success	Deep Throat theatrical release poster
1977	Best Adult Film 1955–60	Tonight for Sure – Francis Ford Coppola ^{7}	Deep Throat theatrical release poster
1977	Best Adult Film 1961–65	Not Tonight, Henry! – Ted Paramore beat Sinderella and the Golden Bra ^{7}	Deep Throat theatrical release poster
1977	Best Adult Film 1966–70	Trader Hornee – David F. Friedman beat Starlet (also by Friedman)	Deep Throat theatrical release poster
1977	Best Adult Film 1971–75	Sometime Sweet Susan beat The Devil in Miss Jones	Deep Throat theatrical release poster
1977	Literary Man of the Year	Prof. Arthur Knight, film critic, historian, and teacher at the University of Southern California film school	Deep Throat theatrical release poster
1978	Man of the Year	Larry Flynt, publisher of Hustler, and Gene Reeves, the attorney who was with him when Flynt was shot on March 6, 1978, in Georgia.	Deep Throat theatrical release poster
1978	Literary Man of the Year	Al Goldstein	Deep Throat theatrical release poster
1978	Best Media Man	Bruce Williamson of Playboy	Deep Throat theatrical release poster
1979	Literary Man of the Year	Dr. Wardell B. Pomeroy of the Institute for Sex Research	Deep Throat theatrical release poster
1980	Media Man of the Year	Jim Harwood of Daily Variety	Deep Throat theatrical release poster
1981	Media Man of the Year	David Shute	Deep Throat theatrical release poster
1981	Woman of the Year	Virginia Ann Perry-Rhine, a past AFAA president	Deep Throat theatrical release poster
1981	Man of the Year Award	David F. Friedman, a past AFAA president and current board chairman	Deep Throat theatrical release poster
1981	Pioneer Woman of the Year	Ava Leighton	Deep Throat theatrical release poster
1981	Pioneer Man of the Year	Dan Sonney	Deep Throat theatrical release poster
1982			Deep Throat theatrical release poster
1983	Pioneer Man of the Year Award	Louis K. Sher	Deep Throat theatrical release poster
1983	Life Achievement Award	Vincent Miranda	Deep Throat theatrical release poster
1984	Award of Merit	Dr. Lois Lee, founder of Children of the Night, on which Children of the Night was partially based on.	Deep Throat theatrical release poster
1985	Pioneer of the Year Award	Paul Mart	Deep Throat theatrical release poster

== Lifetime Achievement Awards ==
After the Erotic Film Awards were discontinued, the association resumed presenting Lifetime Achievement Awards at its annual "Night of the Stars" fundraising event, starting in mid-1988. When the association merged into the Free Speech Coalition in late 1992, the new coalition took over the tradition.

=== Actresses ===
- 1988: Nina Hartley
- 1989: Sharon Kane
- 1990: Kay Parker
- 1991: Georgina Spelvin
- 1992: Marilyn Chambers

=== Actors ===
- 1988: Joey Silvera
- 1989: John Leslie
- 1990: Eric Edwards
- 1991: Paul Thomas
- 1992: Herschel Savage

=== Directors ===
- 1988: Anthony Spinelli
- 1989: Gerard Damiano
- 1990: Alex de Renzy
- 1991: Henri Pachard
- 1992: Cecil Howard

=== Joel T. Warner 'Good Guy' Award ===
- 1988: Mike Horner
- 1989: Al Bloom
- 1990: Hal Freeman
- 1991: Mel Kamins & Bobby Lilly
- 1992: Russ Hampshire

=== Hal Freeman 'Freedom Isn't Free' Award ===
- 1989: Al Goldstein
- 1990: Bob Guccione
- 1991: Barry Freilich
- 1992: Phil Harvey

== Notes ==
^1 Adam Film World recorded the winner of this category in 1979 as having been a tie between Roger Caine and John Seeman. Cinema-X magazine recorded Roger Caine as the sole winner.

^2 This award was called "Best Foreign Language Film" at the 1977 and 1981 awards shows. It was not awarded after 1981.

^3 IMDb states this movie, while advertised as the first X-rated movie made in Russia, was actually made in the U.S.

^4 Adam Film World reported both Seven Into Snowy as winner of "Best Musical Score" and also Get Your Nose Out Of My Pantyhose won "Best Original Musical Score", a different award, in 1978. However, the AFAA's seventh and eighth annual programs, which list previous years' winners, make no mention of Get Your Nose Out of My Pantyhose or any separate "Original" score award. As well, IMDb states "Get Your Nose Out of My Pantyhose" is not a movie, but a song from a movie called Breaker Beauties, so Adam Film World's report of an "Original" score award may be erroneous.

^5 The official 8th Annual AFAA Erotic Film Awards program lists both songs as having won the award, however Jim Holliday's Only the Best book only mentions "With You" from Roommates as winning. Cheri magazine's coverage of the awards doesn't mention the category at all.

^6 This award was called "Best Production Values" at the 1979 and 1980 awards shows.

^7 Adam Film World' and Cinema Blue coverage of the first Erotica Awards both listed Not Tonight, Henry! as having won "Best Adult Film 1961-65" and Tonight For Sure as having won "Best Adult Film 1955-60". However, Not Tonight, Henry! premiered Dec. 30, 1960 in Los Angeles, while Tonight For Sure premiered in L.A., Oct. 25, 1962, so it's likely an error by the AFAA resulted in each film being given the award for the other's time period. Nominee Sinderella and the Golden Bra was listed in the correct time period. Jim Holliday's book, Only the Best, lists the movies as having won in the correct time periods, however.
