= Abigail Clayton =

American actress (1948–2021)

- Born: Gail Ann Lawrence; 28 November 1948; New York City, U.S.
- Died: 1 December 2021 (aged 73); Lakeport, California, U.S.
- Other names: Debbie Lordan; Abagail Clayton; Gail Wezke
- Occupation: Pornographic actress
- Years active: 1975–1980
- Spouse: N.N.
- Children: 2

Gail Ann Lawrence (November 28, 1948 – December 1, 2021), professionally usually credited as Abigail Clayton, was an American pornographic actress active during the Golden Age of Porn. She was inducted into the XRCO Hall of Fame in 2008.

== Early life ==
Gail Lawrence was born on November 28, 1948, in New York City, as the second of five children of Charles T. Lawrence (1929–1988), a descendant of Irish immigrants, and Helen C. (Brackett) Lawrence (1932–1985), of English and Hungarian ancestry. Gail's parents married in October 1947, when Helen was age 15 1/2 and Charles, 17 5/6, about two months before the birth of Gail's older brother. The family initially lived in the Bayside neighborhood of Queens, where her father worked as a heating repair contractor. They later relocated to Huntington, New York. Gail attended Huntington High School, graduating in 1966, and Stony Brook University, where she obtained a Bachelor's degree in Fine Arts in 1971.

== Adult film career ==
After college, without a particular professional objective in mind, Clayton moved to San Francisco because, in her own words, "it was the center for interesting things". Following assorted temporary jobs, she found employment on the production staff of indie and adult films, working as assistant and editor for Alex de Renzy and others. She gradually began appearing in front of the camera as well, ultimately adopting the stage name Abigail Clayton, first posing for magazines such as Hustler and Swank before making the jump to adult films.

One of Clayton's earliest movies was Alex de Renzy's Femmes de Sade, filmed in 1975, which was the eighth film inducted into XRCO's Hall of Fame. Clayton also appeared in Harold Lime's Desires Within Young Girls with Georgina Spelvin and was the title character in Antonio Shepherd's 7 Into Snowy, a parody of Snow White and the Seven Dwarfs. Other roles included that of a wealthy socialite in Howard Ziehm's Hot Cookies and of an artificial lesbian lover in Anthony Spinelli's parody of the Westworld films, Sex World. Her last adult film was October Silk in 1980.

Clayton appeared in the July 1977 issue of Playboy as part of a feature about current adult movie stars who "represent an entirely new breed of liberated lovelies [...] upwardly mobile—beautiful, skeptical, seriously ambitious, intellectually and aesthetically together as never before."

Clayton's career coincided with the porn chic era, when adult movies were shown in mainstream theaters. Her name would often appear in ads in major newspapers of the time, alongside other stars such as Annette Haven and Leslie Bovee.

== Mainstream films ==
Abigail Clayton was one of the first adult stars to move into mainstream films (under her real name, Gail Lawrence), when she appeared in Bye Bye Monkey with Gérard Depardieu and Marcello Mastroianni. In 1980, she was cast as Rita in the horror film Maniac. Her last mainstream role was a small part as a nun in the Ryan O'Neal film So Fine in 1981.

== Later career ==
After exiting the film industry, Clayton earned an MBA degree in Marketing from New York University and joined the regular workforce.

== Personal life ==
Clayton was rumored to be the daughter of a "successful doctor" on the East Coast. While living in California, she dated actor Ken Scudder, whom she met filming a porn loop. She later married a male nurse who was a junkie, but they divorced. In November 1976, she gave birth to a daughter. After returning to New York City in 1978, she had a brief relationship with fellow porn actor Jamie Gillis. She then dated, and eventually married, an older business executive, with whom she lived in the Huntington, New York, area for most of the rest of her life.

== Filmography ==
Clayton only appeared in 15 original adult films during her career, far fewer than most other adult stars. Scenes from these movies have since been reused in more than 30 derivative "compilation" films, which are not listed below. Additionally, she was featured in a number of shorts (loops) that did not receive wide distribution.

=== Adult films ===
- The Girls in the Band (1976)
- Dixie (1976)
- Love Lips (1978)
- Femmes de Sade (1976)
- Spirit Of Seventy Sex (1976)
- Naked Afternoon (1976)
- Hot Cookies (1977)
- Desires Within Young Girls (1977)
- A Coming of Angels (1977)
- 7 Into Snowy (1977)
- Sex World (1977)
- Untamed (1978)
- Health Spa (1978)
- Cave Women (1979)
- October Silk (1980)

=== Mainstream films ===
- Bye Bye Monkey (1978)
- Maniac (1980)
- So Fine (1981)

== Awards ==
- 1979 AFAA Award (nominated) - Best Actress (Health Spa)
- 2008 XRCO Hall of Fame - Film Pioneer

== See also ==
- List of pornographic actors who appeared in mainstream films
