= Critics Adult Film Association =

Critics Adult Film Awards
- Awarded for: Excellence in the porn film genre.
- Sponsored by: East Coast Producers Association of the Adult Film Association of America
- Location: New York City
- Country: United States
- Presented by: Critics Adult Film Association
- Reward: Trophy
- First award: 1981
- Final award: 1987

The Critics Adult Film Association (CAFA) was a New York–based group of East Coast adult sex film critics, which bestowed awards upon those working in pornographic film during the 1980s. The awards were first presented in 1981, honoring the movies of the previous year. Talk Dirty to Me, a sex comedy starring John Leslie, who won Best Actor, was voted best film of 1980. Samantha Fox was the first Best Actress, winning for her role in This Lady Is A Tramp, another sex comedy.

Amanda By Night, an adult crime-drama and Roommates, also a drama, would become CAFA's most-honored movies, with the latter being presented with seven awards in 1983, including Best Director (Chuck Vincent) and Best Actress (Veronica Hart). Amanda By Night scooped six awards the previous year in a ceremony "held at the famed Copacabana": Best Film, Best Actress (Hart), Best Supporting Actress (Lisa De Leeuw), Best Director (Robert McCallum), Best Screenplay and Best Editing.

The CAFA and Adult Film Association of America awards were considered the major adult film awards of the Golden Age of Porn. By 1985, sex news magazine Cheri declared: "Held at the Silver Lining, a snazzy little bistro on the West Side's Restaurant Row, the fifth-annual Critics Adult Film Awards was a gentle reminder that porn films can be measured against standards other than the Peter Meter."

The seventh CAFA Awards were presented May 27, 1987, in Manhattan. The association seems to have faded away after that, as did the New York–based adult film industry, overtaken by the X-Rated Critics Organization and its Heart-On Awards, which had first been presented two years earlier and which were based in California, the new centre of porn production.

In 1986 all three awards programs chose the same Best Picture, Best Director and Best Actress.

== CAFA Awards ==
The trophies were called the Critics Adult Film Award and each was inscribed with the year the award was being given for, on a gold-plated round icon with decorative edges on a wooden base.

In 1987, Cinema Blue magazine described the voting as a two-stage process: "CAFA President Jack Shugg and officers Steffani Martin, Colette Connor and Will H. Jarvis, aided and abetted by the members of CAFA...mail out two ballots to the New York porn critics. On the first ballot, the critics make five choices for best movies and performers in each category. (This year, any film or video released between January 1, 1986, and February 28, 1987, was eligible.) The ballots are then mailed back and the officers and their assistants count them. The choices with the most votes are then listed on a second ballot and again mailed to the critics who make one final choice in each category. These votes are once again tabulated and the movie or performer in each category with the most votes becomes the winner."

Winners are listed below by the year in which the awards presentation was held, not by year the award was for, which was the previous year.

=== Best Film ===
Year	Film
1981	Talk Dirty to Me
1982	Amanda By Night
1983	Irresistible
1984 (tie)	The Devil in Miss Jones 2; Sexcapades
1985 (tie)	Raw Talent – Joyce Snyder, producer and Larry Revene, director; Good Girls, Bad Girls – Arthur Ben, producer-director
1986	Taboo American Style
1987	Winner: The Devil in Miss Jones 3 Nominees: Behind the Green Door: the Sequel, Every Woman Has a Fantasy 2, Lust on the Orient Express, The Oddest Couple, Star Angel

=== Best Actress ===
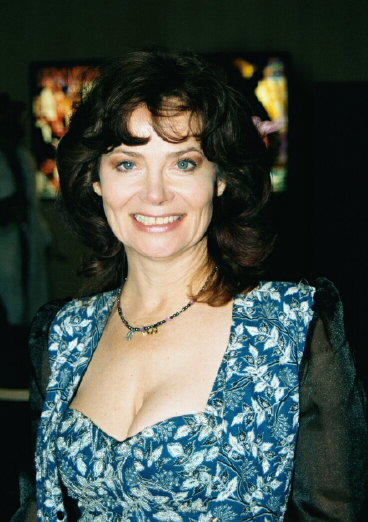
Veronica Hart at the 2002 AVN Adult Entertainment Expo

Year	Actress
1981	Samantha Fox – This Lady Is A Tramp
1982	Veronica Hart – Amanda By Night
1983	Veronica Hart – Roommates
1984	Sharon Mitchell – Sexcapades
1985	Colleen Brennan – Trinity Brown
1986	Gloria Leonard – Taboo American Style
1987	Sheri St. Claire – Sweet Revenge

=== Best Actor ===
Year	Actor
1981	John Leslie – Talk Dirty to Me
1982	Richard Pacheco – Nothing to Hide
1983	John Leslie – Talk Dirty to Me 2
1984	Eric Edwards – Sexcapades
1985	Tom Byron^{1}
1986	Eric Edwards – Corporate Assets
1987	Jerry Butler – Star Angel^{2}

=== Best Supporting Actress ===
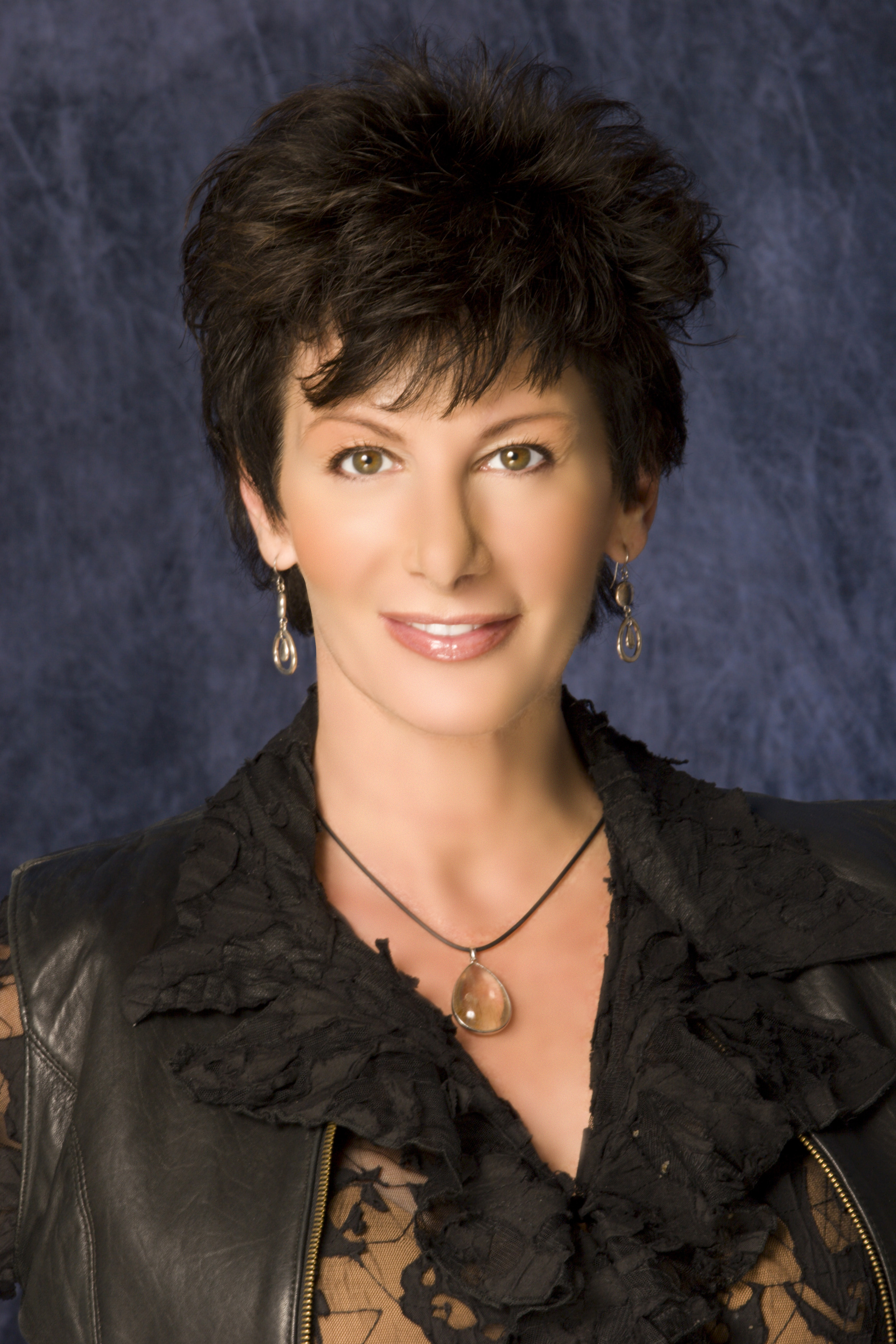
Erotic actress Sharon Mitchell

Year	Actress
1981	Vanessa del Rio – Dracula Exotica
1982 (tie)	Lisa De Leeuw – Amanda By Night; Vanessa del Rio – Dancers
1983 (tie)	Lisa De Leeuw – The Blonde Next Door; Sharon Mitchell – Blue Jeans
1984	Sharon Mitchell – Night Hunger
1985	Colleen Brennan – Good Girl, Bad Girl
1986	Sheri St. Claire – Corporate Assets
1987 (tie)	Kay Parker – Careful He May Be Watching; Tasha Voux – The Oddest Couple

=== Best Supporting Actor ===
Year	Actor
1981	Richard Pacheco – Talk Dirty to Me
1982	Richard Pacheco – Dancers
1983	Jamie Gillis – Roommates
1984	R. Bolla – The Devil in Miss Jones 2
1985	Tom Byron^{1}
1986	Jose Duval – Taboo American Style
1987	Ron Jeremy – Sweet Revenge

=== Best Director ===
Year	Director
1981	Anthony Spinelli – Talk Dirty to Me
1982	Robert McCallum – Amanda By Night
1983	Chuck Vincent – Roommates
1984	Anthony Spinelli – Dixie Ray, Hollywood Star
1985 (tie)	Fred J. Lincoln – Go for It; Gerard Damiano – Throat... 12 Years After
1986	Henri Pachard – Taboo American Style
1987	Cecil Howard – Star Angel^{2}

=== Best Erotic Scene ===
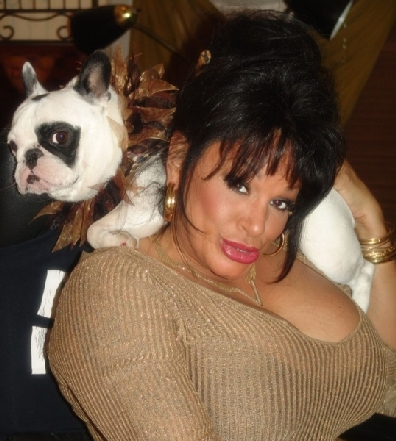
American pornographic actress Vanessa del Rio

Year	Scene
1981	
1982	Games Women Play
1983 (tie)	Roommates (Kelly Nichols and Ron Hudd); Talk Dirty To Me 2 (John Leslie and Nicole Black)
1984	Silk Satin and Sex (with Vanessa del Rio and Jerry Butler)
1985 (tie)	Suze Randall's Stud Hunters ("the Pippi Anderssen group-grope"); Private Teacher ("a Tom Byron/Kay Parker tete-a-tit")
1986	Passage Through Pamela (transsexual scene)
1987	The Oddest Couple (Danielle and David Christopher)

=== Other Categories ===
Like the Academy Awards, CAFA also honored the best in various production categories. For example, at the awards show held in 1985, Every Woman Has a Fantasy scooped up cinematography and music awards, Raw Talent polished off top honors for editing prowess and Sandy Amsterdam's production design and Talk Dirty to Me III netted make-up and costuming kudos for Traci Lords' mermaid tail.

However, unlike the Academy Awards, CAFA also presented awards in categories specific to the pornographic movie industry, such as Best Group Scene, bestowed in 1987 to The Devil in Miss Jones 3: A New Beginning with Vanessa del Rio and seven studs. With the advent of pornography on video, a Best Adult Video award was created, won by Candida Royalle for Urban Heat in 1985 and Christine's Secret in 1987.

The annual Gerard Damiano Special Achievement Award, named after the producer, writer and director of the 1972 cult classic Deep Throat, went to actress Georgina Spelvin in 1982, Erica Eaton, publicist and former CAFA chairperson, in 1985 and Gloria Leonard in 1987.

== Notes ==
^1There is a discrepancy as to which movie(s) Tom Byron won for in 1985. Cheri magazine states "He managed to walk off with Best Actor (for Sister Dearest) and Best Supporting Actor (Talk Dirty To Me III)". Internet Adult Film Database founder Peter Van Aarle lists Private Teacher as his Best Actor win and Sister Dearest as his Best Supporting Actor award.

^2 In the book The X-Rated Videotape Guide II, author Robert Rimmer states, "In May 1987, the CAFA (a New York film critics group) gave Snake Eyes II awards for Best Script (Anne Randall), Best Actor (Jerry Butler, who also received it for the original Snake Eyes), and Best Director (Cecil Howard)." However, this seems unlikely as Snake Eyes II was not released until 1987 and it contradicts two other sources that list Butler and Howard winning in 1987 for Star Angel and no category called Best Script. Possibly Snake Eyes II won the following year, however, there doesn't seem to be a record of whether any awards were held in 1988.
