= Trader Hornee =

1970 film by Jonathan Lucas

- Theatrical poster
- Directed by: Jonathan Lucas
- Written by: David F. Friedman
- Produced by: William Allen Castleman; David F. Friedman; Dan Sonney
- Starring: Buddy Pantsari; Elisabeth Monica; John Alderman; Christine Murray; Deek Sills
- Cinematography: Paul Hipp
- Music by: William Allen Castleman
- Distributed by: Entertainment Ventures Inc.
- Release date: April 1970 (U.S.)
- Language: English

Trader Hornee is a 1970 sexploitation film and directed by Jonathan Lucas and starring Buddy Pantsari, Elisabeth Monica, John Alderman, and Christine Murray, and Deek Sills. Written and produced by David F. Friedman, it is an adult-oriented parody of the vintage safari movie Trader Horn (1931).

In 1977, the Adult Film Association of America gave it a retroactive award of merit at its 1977 Erotica Awards as the movie considered to be the best adult film of 1966 to 1970.

== Premise ==
Detective Hamilton Hornee and his team organize an expedition into mysterious Africa to search for Algona, heiress to her father's fortune. Algona happens to have become a magnificent blonde elephant-riding goddess worshiped by the frightened tribe of the Meshpokas.
