= Sex World =

1977 American pornographic film

- Theatrical release poster
- Directed by: Anthony Spinelli
- Screenplay by: Dean Rogers; Anthony Spinelli
- Story by: Anthony Spinelli
- Produced by: Chris Warfield (as Billy Thornberg)
- Starring: Annette Haven; Lesllie Bovee; Sharon Thorpe; Desiree West; Amber Hunt
- Cinematography: Robert Marksman
- Music by: Berry Lipman
- Production company: Essex Pictures Company
- Distributed by: Essex Distributing
- Release date: 1977
- Running time: 91 minutes
- Country: United States
- Language: English
- Budget: $380,000 budget

Sex World (stylized as SexWorld) is a 1977 (Note: The current distributor of Sex World, Vinegar Syndrome, lists the film's release year as 1977. See the Marketing and release section for details.) American pornographic science fiction film directed by Anthony Spinelli and written by Spinelli and Dean Rogers, from a story by Spinelli. It stars Annette Haven, Lesllie Bovee, Sharon Thorpe, Desiree West, and Amber Hunt. The film primarily takes place at a fictional resort known as Sex World, where individuals can live out their secret sexual desires and overcome their inhibitions with the help of android sexbots.

Sex World has been described as a spoof or pastiche of the Westworld films, and has been called a porn parody.

== Plot ==
A group of people board a charter bus headed to Sex World, a resort where individuals can stay for three days and nights, and have their sexual fantasies be fulfilled. Among the passengers are a painter named Joan Rice and her husband Jerry; a woman named Millicent and her submissive, impotent partner Ralph; and the lonely and introverted Lisa, who recalls an experience in which she wore a blonde wig and had phone sex with a stranger. The passengers are handed questionnaires and are informed that, in order to guarantee privacy, they are prohibited from fraternizing with each other at the resort.

The bus arrives at Sex World, and that night, the visitors each sit down with individual counselors to be interviewed about their sexual desires. Unbeknownst to the visitors, the discussions are being monitored by a control room of technicians whose jobs are to ensure the fulfillment of their fantasies. In a private room, a white visitor named Roger encounters Jill, a black woman he saw on the bus to Sex World. Despite his racial prejudices, Jill convinces Roger to have sexual intercourse with her. Meanwhile, Jerry finds himself in a room with two girls, Linda and Jo. The girls perform cunnilingus on one another, before both fellating Jerry.

In her interview, Joan describes her attraction to her next-door neighbor Marian. Her desire is then fulfilled in the form of an artificial Marian, who kisses and performs cunnilingus on Joan. Elsewhere, Millicent and Ralph separately speak to their individual counselors. Millicent expresses her wish to be dominated, while Ralph reveals his secret cuckolding fetish. Millicent then engages in rough intercourse with an individual named Phil—who describes himself as being programmed to have stamina—while Ralph watches them through a one-way mirror. Ralph is then led away to another room by Ann, who manages to give him an erection, and the two have sex.

Dale, a woman who wistfully recalls her former lover Alex, is provided with a partner named Tomas. After she lowers her emotional barriers, she and Tomas kiss and have sex. During Lisa's interview, Lisa reveals her desire to be noticed and treated with kindness. She also discloses that she attends X-rated films, and conveys an interest in Johnnie Keyes from Behind the Green Door. Later, she receives a knock on the door of her room from a man who says that he saw her when she arrived, and that he wants to be with her. She denies him entry, and he leaves. An artificial Johnnie Keyes then enters her room. He performs cunnilingus on her, they have intercourse, and she fellates him.

At the end of the weekend, the visitors board the bus to leave Sex World. Joan confides in a counselor that she is worried about her marriage with Jerry. Ralph, now confident and assertive, kisses Millicent and boards the bus with her and the other departing visitors. Meanwhile, Roger attempts to bribe a Sex World employee into allowing him to stay at the resort again, but the employee refuses the offer.

== Cast ==
- Lesllie Bovee as Joan Rice (as Leslie Bovee)
- Kent Hall as Jerry Rice
- Kay Parker as Millicent
- Jack Wright as Ralph
- Sharon Thorpe as Lisa
- John Leslie as Roger
- Desiree West as Jill
- Annette Haven as Dale
- Peter Johns as Lisa's Caller
- Amber Hunt as Linda
- Carol Tong as Jo
- Abigail Clayton as Marian
- Joey Silvera as Phil (as Joe Civera)
- Eileen Dover as Ann
- Suzette Holland as Alex
- Roberto Ramos as Tomas
- Jake Freeman as Man at Lisa's Door
- Johnnie Keyes as Johnnie Keyes

== Marketing and release ==
In March 1978, Walnut Properties, the company that owned the adult movie theater chain Pussycat Theaters, won a lawsuit which enabled it to place Pussycat Theaters advertisements in Southern California Rapid Transit District buses to promote the release of Sex World. In his ruling, the judge cited a state supreme court decision that requires transportation companies owned by public agencies which sell ad space on their buses to accept advertising from anyone, as long as it is not obscene or libelous. The posters on the buses advertising the film said: "Westworld was for children, Futureworld was for teen-agers, but Sex World ... is definitely for adults."

Several sources list the film's release year as 1977, including home video distributor Vinegar Syndrome. Other sources, however, list the film's release year as 1978.

== Home media ==
Sex World was released on VHS in 1985. In 2014, the film was released on DVD and Blu-ray by Vinegar Syndrome. This release, which features a 4K restoration of the film from its original 35 mm camera negative, was limited to 1,500 units. In 2015, Vinegar Syndrome re-released the film as a standalone DVD, and in 2016, they re-released it on Blu-ray. Vinegar Syndrome released the film on 4K UHD in February 2021.

== Reception ==
Film critic Kent Smith wrote "this movie rates high, but it fails to live up to its potential; most of the sex is the standard adult formula, but the performances are better than most in spite of an occasional slip into melodrama; the film has some nice sets, high production values, and stimulates – in many ways – what one would find on primetime television; but the film doesn't live up to its science-fiction billing."

Michael Stott of Hustler said "Spinelli has taken this simple premise (a two-day Shangrila of secret dreams comes true), a spin-off from Westworld and Futureworld, and woven a funny, often genuinely touching tapestry of sexual inhibition and satisfaction." Al Goldstein opined that "Spinelli created a total cinematic package, not just a horny sexual turn-on; made to mimic the mainstream epic Westworld, the movie uses that film as a starting point for an exuberant, pulsating sojourn through the world of adult fantasy; there is even a moral of sorts; watch our what you dream, because your dreams may come true."

The Boca Raton News said the film is "so edited and expurgated it could have easily gotten by on an R rating, if not a PG." They went on to say that "porno stars are not generally known for dramatic ability; watching them having to rely on dialogue and furtive physical action is like watching Mark Spitz swim the 100 meter freestyle in full rain gear; Sex World, in this case, is dull world."
