= Lisa De Leeuw =

American pornographic film actress

- Occupation: Pornographic film actress

Lisa De Leeuw is an American former pornographic film actress.

== Career ==
She appeared in over 200 films and was inducted into both the X-Rated Critics Organization, XRCO Hall of Fame and the AVN Hall of Fame.

== Alleged death ==
In the 2000 book Skinflicks: The Inside Story of the X-Rated Video Industry, writer and porn producer David Jennings describes the stigma and rumors surrounding AIDS in the porn community in the late 1980s and early 1990s. He wrote: "Reputed to be dead of AIDS, Lisa DeLeeuw and Brandy Alexandre, now out of the industry, proclaimed themselves alive and healthy." However, in 2003, another publication, Headpress 25, claimed that De Leeuw died of complications from HIV/AIDS on November 11, 1993.

== Awards ==
- 1981 CAFA Award for Best Supporting Actress – Amanda by Night
- 1982 CAFA Award for Best Supporting Actress – Blonde Heat
- 1985 AVN Award for Best Supporting Actress—Film – Dixie Ray, Hollywood Star
- 1986 AVN Award for Best Supporting Actress—Film – Raw Talent

== See also ==
- Golden Age of Porn
