= Obsessed (1977 film) =

- Film poster
- Directed by: Martin & Martin
- Written by: Piastro Cruiso
- Produced by: The Strangers
- Starring: John Leslie; Annette Haven; Constance Money
- Cinematography: Seemour Klein
- Edited by: Nick Roberts
- Music by: The Avengers
- Release date: 1977 (United States)
- Running time: 75 minutes
- Country: United States
- Language: English

Obsessed (also known as Anna Obsessed and Blue Obsessions) is a 1977 pornographic film directed by Martin & Martin, and written by Piastro Cruiso.

== Plot ==
Anna Carson awakens from a recurring nightmare, and later has unsatisfying sex with her husband, a businessman named David, as a prowler watches the two of them through their living room window. The next morning, Anna and David argue about the long hours David has been working, and about how bad their sex has become. Anna then drives into town, followed by the voyeur, as her car radio discusses the Long Island Rape Murderer, a serial killer who has been raping and killing women and children. At a train station, Anna meets Maggie Ronson, a photographer who later tracks Anna down to a beauty salon, to return a datebook Anna had dropped.

In the Carson home, Anna and David discuss their failing marriage before David goes to work, where he makes dinner plans with his secretary. While out shopping one night, Anna is sexually assaulted by the Long Island Rape Murderer. After Maggie invites her over, Anna confides in Maggie about being attacked, and the two enter a relationship, while David begins an affair of his own with his secretary. The Long Island Rape Murderer continues to stalk Anna, steals objects like pictures and underwear from her, and has erotic fantasies about her.

Anna has sex with David (flashing back to being raped in the midst) and afterward tells him about how she believes Maggie can help their floundering relationship. The Long Island Rape Murderer is shown angrily destroying a photograph of Anna, who has dinner with David and Maggie, then a threesome. After the trio finish, Maggie is revealed to be the Long Island Rape Murderer, and she shoots David and Anna. The police arrive, and as they arrest the seemingly catatonic Maggie, she shoots a detective, and is in turn brought down in a hail of gunfire by a lieutenant.

== Cast ==
- Constance Money as Anna Carson
- Annette Haven as Maggie Ronson
- John Leslie as David Carson
- Suzanne McBain as David's Secretary
- Jamie Gillis as The Secretary's Fantasy Man

== Reception ==
Adam Film World gave Obsessed a 4/5 ("Volcanic") while Hustler Erotic Video awarded it a 3/4. AVN's Peter Warren gave the film a 4 out of 5, and opined that it "is well acted and directed, and gets increasingly steamy as Money begins a lesbian affair with Haven". Justin McKinney of The Bloody Pit of Horror, who gave Obsessed a 2.5 out of a possible 5, wrote "As far as hardcore goes, not too bad. There's a good plot/sex ratio, a stylish (though abrupt) finale and above average (for porn) acting from Leslie and Haven. Money, on the other hand, isn't much of an actress even by porn standards and seems highly sedated throughout. Most of grisly stuff occurs offscreen, though there's a little violence at the very end".
