= Bye Bye Monkey =

1978 Italian-French comedy-drama film

- Italian theatrical release poster
- Directed by: Marco Ferreri
- Written by: Marco Ferreri; Gérard Brach; Rafael Azcona
- Produced by: Maurice Bernart
- Starring: Gérard Depardieu; Marcello Mastroianni; James Coco; Gail Lawrence; Geraldine Fitzgerald
- Cinematography: Luciano Tovoli
- Edited by: Ruggero Mastroianni
- Music by: Philippe Sarde
- Distributed by: Fida International Film (Italy); Gaumont Distribution (France)
- Release dates: 24 February 1978 (Italy); 24 May 1978 (France)
- Running time: 113 minutes
- Countries: Italy; France
- Language: English

Bye Bye Monkey (Italian: Ciao maschio, French: Rêve de singe) is a 1978 Italian-French comedy-drama film, directed by Marco Ferreri and starring Gérard Depardieu, Marcello Mastroianni, James Coco, Gail Lawrence, and Geraldine Fitzgerald. It is about a man who finds a baby chimpanzee in a giant King Kong prop, and decides to raise it like a son. It was filmed in English and shot in Long Island, New York. As this was a French-Italian co-production, French and Italian dubbed versions were made for their respective countries' theatrical releases.

== Plot ==
The film is set in a darkly surreal and dystopian version of New York City that is mostly devoid of humans and populated only by rats and a few eccentrics. Lafayette is a young French electrician, living on his own in a basement. He works for Andreas Flaxman, the cynical owner of a waxwork museum. The museum is dedicated to recreating scenes from the Roman Empire. He works alongside his friend the sculptor Luigi Nocello. Nocello maintains the varied and often macabre wax displays, such as the Crucifixion of Jesus and the Assassination of Julius Caesar, which fill the museum.

Lafayette also works as a lighting technician for a feminist theatre group. After rehearsal one day, the women in the group discuss their next project, and decide to improvise a piece about rape for their next production, contending that women are just as capable of violence as men are; in the middle of their discussion, they knock Lafayette unconscious with a bottle of Coca-Cola, pin him down, and the attractive Angelica volunteers to rape Lafayette.

Beside the Hudson River, amidst a construction site of Battery Park City, Lafayette meets Luigi and a band of eccentrics. The group finds an abandoned baby chimpanzee in the palm of a giant King Kong sculpture. Lafayette decides to adopt the chimpanzee. When he brings the chimp with him to the museum, Flaxman warns him that the chimp will rob him of his freedom, if he does not get rid of it.

Flaxman is approached by the mysterious Paul Jefferson of the State Foundation for Psychological Research. He convinces the initially resistant Flaxman to transform the face of the sculpture of Julius Caesar into the face of John F. Kennedy.

Angelica, who has become enamored with Lafayette, moves into his sordid flat and shares in the care of the infant chimp. However, when Lafayette does not respond to the news that she is pregnant, she moves out. Alone again, he returns one day to find his baby ape eaten by rats. In total despair and needing human contact, he breaks into the waxwork museum, but is met with hostility by the owner. The two fight, and a fire, presumably caused by faulty wiring, consumes them both. Later, Angelica is seen on the shore. She plays happily with her child.

== Cast ==
- Gérard Depardieu as Gerard Lafayette
- Marcello Mastroianni as Luigi Nocello
- James Coco as Andreas Flaxman
- Geraldine Fitzgerald as Mrs. Toland
- Gail Lawrence as Angelica
- Stefania Casini as Feminist Actress
- Mimsy Farmer as Feminist Actress
- Avon Long as Miko
- Francesca De Sapio as Feminist Actress
- Enrico Blasi

== Reception and release ==
On review aggregator website Rotten Tomatoes the film has an approval rating of 60% based on 5 critics, with an average rating of 6.20/10.

Jesús Fernández Santos of El País said that "The film's true interest resides, above all, in the effective scenes of dark humor and in the general idea of the script, which is surely Marco Ferreri's most ambitious one to date".

On 14 July 2009, the film was released on DVD by Koch Lorber Films, a division of Entertainment One.

== Awards ==
The film was presented at the official competition of the 1978 Cannes Film Festival and received the Grand Prize of the Jury, in tie with Jerzy Skolimowski's The Shout.
