= Wanda Whips Wall Street =

- Film poster by John Solie
- Directed by: Larry Revene
- Written by: Rick Marx
- Starring: Veronica Hart; Ron Jeremy; Jamie Gillis; Sharon Mitchell
- Distributed by: Platinum Pictures (1982)
- Release date: 1982
- Country: United States
- Language: English

Wanda Whips Wall Street is a 1982 pornographic film directed by Larry Revene and starring Veronica Hart. The film was recut with additional footage for an R rated version titled Stocks and Blondes.

== Plot ==
Wanda Brandt, a corporate takeover engineer, plots to take control of a Wall Street investment firm by sexually blackmailing the corporate stockholders out of their holdings. Things get complicated for Wanda when the firm hires an investigator (played by Jamie Gillis) to determine the cause of the stock instability.
