= Alex de Renzy =

American pornographic film director and producer (1935–2001)

- Born: August 13, 1935; Brooklyn, New York City, New York, U.S.
- Died: June 8, 2001 (aged 65); Los Angeles, California, U.S.
- Years active: 1968-1997

Alexander de Renzy (August 13, 1935 – June 8, 2001) was an American director and producer of pornographic movies.

Born in New York City, de Renzy served in the United States Air Force as a Survival Instructor. Back in the United States, he began making documentary films in San Francisco. In October 1969, he went to Denmark to attend Sex 69, the first porn trade show hosted in Copenhagen after the legalization of adult pornography there. This resulted in his first movie, Censorship in Denmark: A New Approach (1970), which was released the following year.

He was the editor on Sexual Encounter Group (1970), was a cinematographer on seven movies, and wrote five screenplays. His production Lady Freaks (1973) introduced porn star legend Annette Haven. His films also include the two 1970s porn classics Babyface (1977) and Pretty Peaches (1978).

Another de Renzy discovery was Desireé Cousteau. She won the Adult Film Association of America Award in 1978 for "Best Actress" for her starring role in Pretty Peaches and became an international sex star. The plot of Pretty Peaches derives from Voltaire's literary classic Candide about a naive young woman undergoing a series of hardships which constitute the satire. Peaches contains a notorious enema scene (and for a time was censored from the VHS release, restored in Alpha Blue's DVD release) in which the powerful jet-spray from Cousteau's hindquarters knocks the administering physician to the bathroom floor, to which Peaches bemoans "I don't think he could cure anything!"

A third actress de Renzy introduced to adult films was Juliet Anderson, better known as "Aunt Peg".

He won the Adult Film Association of America Award in 1977 for Best Director for "Babyface", and was inducted into the AVN Hall of Fame and the XRCO Hall of Fame.

After filming his final story-driven works, Slave to Love and Two Women, de Renzy reinvented himself as Rex Borsky in 1991. He churned out adult video quickies, shooting over 200 hardcore videos, with a special emphasis on anal sex.

Alex de Renzy suffered a fatal stroke and diabetic attack while in his hotel room in Los Angeles during the production of his last video.

== Partial filmography ==
- Censorship in Denmark: A New Approach (1970)
- A History of the Blue Movie (1970)
- Little Sisters (1972)
- Femmes de Sade (1976)
- Babyface (1977)
- Pretty Peaches (1978)
- Dirty Girls (1984)
- Wild Things (1985)
- Moving In (1986)
- Pretty Peaches 2 (1987)
- The Big Thrill (1989)
- Rapture (1990)
- Two Women (1992)
- Slave to Love (1993)

as Rex Borsky:

- Anal Addict (1995)
- Anal Hellraiser (1995)
- Anal Sweetheart (1995)
- Anal Breakdown (1994)
- Gang Bang Wild Style I & II (1994)
- Anal Justice (1994)
- Booty Mistress (1994)
- Gang Bang Nymphette (1994)
- Anal Co-ed (1993)
- Anal Sensations (1993)
- Anal Siege (1993)
- Anal Taboo (1993)
- Anal Carnival (1992)
- Anal Cuties of Chinatown (1992)
- Anal Madness (1992)
- Anal Rookies (1992)
- Anal Innocence (1991)
- Anal Revolution (1991)
- Anal Starlets (1991)
