= Jim Holliday =

American pornographic film director and historian

- Born: 1948
- Died: December 15, 2004 (aged 55–56); Chatsworth, California
- Other names: Amanda Hunter, Clay Hyde
- Occupations: Film director, critic, historian

Jim Holliday (1948 – December 15, 2004) was an American pornographic film director, critic, and historian. He was a founder and previously the honorary historian of the X-Rated Critics Organization.

Holliday was also a member of the AVN Hall of Fame and the XRCO Hall of Fame.

Holliday died on December 15, 2004, in Chatsworth, California, US due to complications from diabetes.

== Books ==
- (1986) Only the best: Jim Holliday's adult video almanac and trivia treasury. Van Nuys, CA: Cal Vista Direct
