= Georgina Spelvin =

American pornographic actress (born 1936)

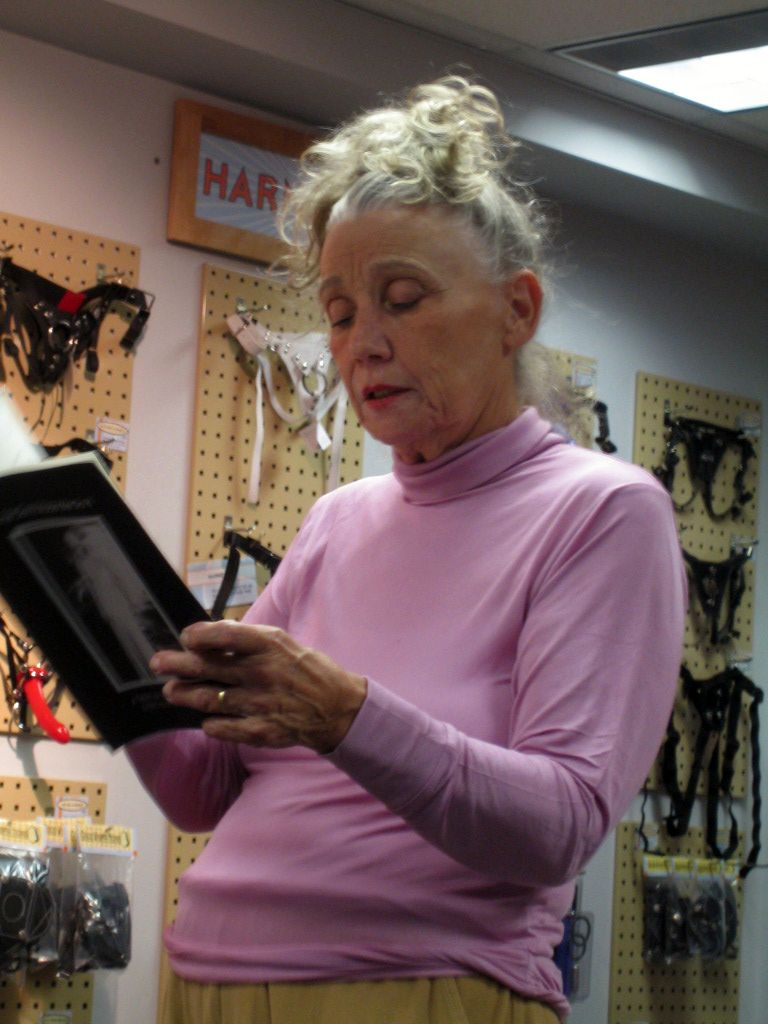
- Spelvin in 2008
- Born: Shelley Bob Graham; March 1, 1936 (age 90); Houston, Texas, U.S.
- Other names: Chele Graham; Shelley Abels; Claudia Clitoris; Dorothy May; Merle Miller; Ruth Raymond; Georgette Spelvin; Ona Tural
- Occupations: Actress; pornographic performer
- Years active: 1957–1982
- Height: 5 ft 4 in (1.63 m)
- Spouse: John Welsh (m. 2000)
- Website: georgiespelvin.com

Shelley Bob Graham (born March 1, 1936), known professionally as Georgina Spelvin, is an American former actress and pornographic performer, best known as the star of the classic 1973 pornographic film The Devil in Miss Jones, released during the Golden Age of Porn (1969–1984).

== Life and career ==
=== Early life ===
Spelvin was born in Houston, Texas, at 2:24 pm on March 1, 1936, as Shelley Bob Graham. Her father was a geophysicist, and the family moved frequently. She often took dancing lessons during childhood. She graduated from high school in 1954.

At first, I wanted to be an opera singer, but my voice wasn't good enough. My second choice was ballerina. After that, it was a series of compromises.

— Georgina Spelvin

=== New York City ===
Graham began her professional career as dancer and later as a chorus girl in Pajama Game, and was featured in the Broadway productions of Cabaret, Guys and Dolls, and Sweet Charity. During that time, she changed the spelling of her name to "Chele Graham", but kept the pronunciation the same. When performance offers dwindled, she worked in theater production as a choreographer, director, and lighting technician in a number of musicals, which led to the underground film scene.

=== Pornography ===
The stage name she adopted is a variation on George Spelvin, traditionally used as a pseudonym by stage actors for the second billing, when playing two roles.

She made her first movie, The Twilight Girls, a softcore film, in 1957, and appeared in a few sexploitation features during the late 1960s.

Graham moved into porn when her friend, actor Marc Stevens, introduced her to adult film director Gerard Damiano. She became one of the best-known figures in hardcore pornography for her starring role in The Devil in Miss Jones in 1973.

I took the role very seriously. I was doing Hedda Gabler here! The fact that there was hard-core sex involved was incidental as far as I was concerned. I was totally deluded. I had made myself believe that I was an actress. I was showing true life as it really was, including actual sex as it really happened, instead of the phony stuff that you got from Hollywood. That was my raison d'etre throughout the whole thing. It was okay; I was okay; I wasn't a slut.

— Georgina Spelvin, on Devil in Miss Jones

In 1973, Robert Berkvist, writing in The New York Times, commented that "'Miss Jones' is as familiar in [the respectable and well-to-do New York suburb of] Scarsdale as she is on Broadway."

In 1974, she appeared in the low-budget exploitation film Girls For Rent (a.k.a. I Spit on Your Corpse), for which she also served as costume designer.

The Devil in Miss Jones. This was the "birth" of Georgina Spelvin in 1974. From there it was, again, all downhill. This descent spiraled into the pits of sleaze-bag strip joints and alcoholism. Sobriety came November 11, 1981.

— Georgina Spelvin

In 1974, while living in Maine, she was charged with transporting obscene materials across state lines for her film Devil in Miss Jones in Tennessee. The charges were eventually dropped in 1977.

In 1975, she moved to El Cajon, California, with Claire Lumiere (a.k.a. Judith Hamilton), met Vince Miranda and appeared in Take It Off at his theatre, the Off-Broadway.

Spelvin appeared in more than 70 adult films, such as Desires Within Young Girls (1977), Sensual Encounters of Every Kind (1978), Honky Tonk Nights (1978), The Ecstasy Girls (1979), Ring of Desire (1981), and Center Spread Girls (1982), before retiring from the industry in 1982.

=== Later life ===
Spelvin made cameo appearances in Police Academy (1984) and Police Academy 3: Back in Training (1986). She later had film roles in Bad Blood (1989), in which she was credited as "Ruth Raymond", Return to Justice (1990), and Next Year in Jerusalem (1997), as well as guest-starring roles on the television shows Dream On and The Lost World.

Spelvin learned desktop publishing and worked for the Los Angeles Times until retiring from its staff in 2004.

In 2004, she made a cameo appearance in Vivid Video's remake of The Devil in Miss Jones, titled The New Devil in Miss Jones. Her role did not involve any sex acts. In 2005, she was interviewed for the documentary film Inside Deep Throat. In 2006, she was interviewed for the documentary film Devil in Miss Spelvin, a special feature intended for inclusion with Devil in Miss Jones: The Definitive Collector's Edition.

In 2009, she appeared as herself in the video for Massive Attack's song "Paradise Circus."

In 2011, Spelvin was a guest on an episode (season 1, episode 5) of the Showtime series Dave's Old Porn, in which she viewed and discussed clips from a number of her films (including The Devil in Miss Jones) with host Dave Attell and guest Adam Carolla. In 2017, Spelvin was interviewed in the documentary After Porn Ends 2, about her career in porn.

== Personal life ==
Spelvin met her future husband, actor John Welsh, in 1983.

== Autobiography ==
In May 2008, she published her autobiography, The Devil Made Me Do It, and appeared on camera in a short web clip announcing its release; a self-published work, the book is available through her official website.

== Awards ==
=== Wins ===
- 1976: AFAA Best Supporting Actress for Ping Pong
- 1977: AFAA Best Actress for Desires Within Young Girls
- 1977: Golden Age of Porn Walk of Fame
- 1978: AFAA Best Supporting Actress for Take Off
- 1979: AFAA Best Supporting Actress for Ecstasy Girls
- 1980: AFAA Best Supporting Actress for Urban Cowgirls
- 1981: AFAA Best Actress for Dancers
- 1991: XRCO Lifetime Achievement Award
- 1991: Free Speech Coalition Lifetime Achievement Award
- AVN Hall of Fame
- XRCO Hall of Fame

=== Nominations ===
- 2006: AVN Best Non-Sex Performance for The New Devil in Miss Jones
