= Jim Harwood =

American journalist (1938–1993)

- Born: April 1, 1938; Baton Rouge, Louisiana
- Died: September 3, 1993 (aged 55)
- Education: Southern Methodist University
- Occupation: journalist
- Years active: 1959–1993
- Employer(s): The Wall Street Journal, Variety

Jim Harwood, sometimes given as James Harwood, (April 1, 1938 – September 3, 1993, Freestone, California) was an American journalist, film critic, screenwriter, author, and television producer who spent the majority of his career writing film criticism and news stories for Variety from 1969 through 1993. He also wrote an annual "Sex and Cinema" column for Playboy.

== Career ==
After graduating from Southern Methodist University in the Spring of 1959, Harwood immediately began working as a reporter for The Wall Street Journal at the White House. He left the journal in 1960, and spent the next ten years working as a television producer and writer in San Francisco. From 1969 through 1975 he worked as the part time San Francisco based reporter for Variety, and in 1975 he moved to Los Angeles to take a full time position with that publication. For next thirteen years he wrote film criticism, columns on show business, and financial news stories for Variety in L.A. In 1988 he became Variety's first full time journalist based in San Francisco since the 1920s. He continued in that role until his death five years later of cancer at the age of 55.

In addition to his work for Variety, Harwood co-authored the cookbook Soul Food with Ed Callahan in 1969. He also wrote the annual "Sex and Cinema" column for thirteen years for Playboy.
