= Cecil Howard =

American film director

- Born: c. 1931
- Died: December 16, 2016 (aged 85)
- Other names: Howard Winters, Ward Summers, Umberto Corleone
- Occupations: Film director, adult film performer
- Notable work: Scoundrels, Star Angel

Cecil Howard (c. 1931 – December 16, 2016) was an adult film director whose aliases have included Howard Winters, Ward Summers, and Umberto Corleone.

Prior to beginning his career in pornography, he worked as an art director at book publishing company Lancer Books for several years. He began his career in pornography as a photographer and investor for softcore films made by his childhood friend Armand Weston, then went on to produce for established hardcore directors such as Henri Pachard and Chuck Vincent, before finally going on to direct many of his own films.

He died on December 16, 2016, at the age of 85.

== Awards ==
- 1984 AVN Award – Best Director, Film (Scoundrels)
- 1987 AVN Award – Best Director, Film (Star Angel)
- XRCO Hall of Fame
- AVN Hall of Fame
