= John Leslie (director) =

American pornographic film director, actor and producer (1945–2010)

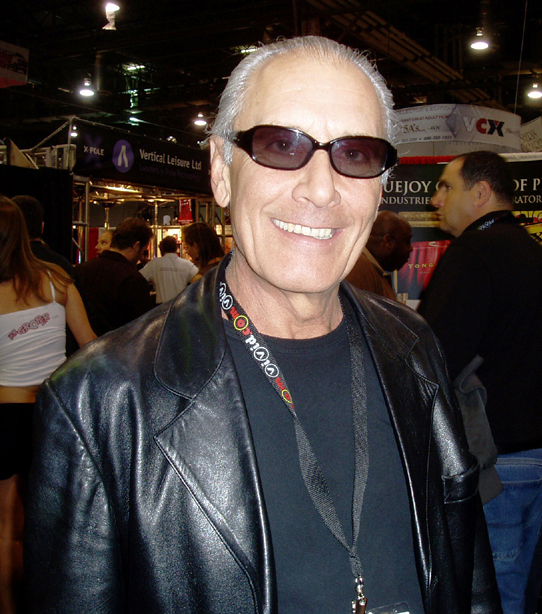
- Leslie at the Adult Entertainment Expo in Las Vegas in 2007
- Born: John Leslie Nuzzo; January 25, 1945; East Liverpool, Ohio, U.S.
- Died: December 5, 2010 (aged 65); Mill Valley, California, U.S.
- Other names: John Lestor, Lenny Kent, John Leslie Dupree, John Leslie Dupré, Louie T. Beagle, Louis T. Beagle, John Lesley, John Lessly, Frederick Watson
- Years active: 1975-2010
- Spouse: Kathleen Lucas (1994-2010) (his death)

John Leslie Nuzzo (January 25, 1945 – December 5, 2010) was an American pornographic film actor-director-producer. Usually credited under the name John Leslie, he also worked under a variety of pseudonyms, including John Leslie Dupre, Frederick Watson, and Lenny Lovely.

Along with Ron Jeremy, Jamie Gillis, John Holmes, and Harry Reems, Leslie was one of the stalwart male stars of the Golden Age of Porn, when blue movies had narratives, relatively high production values, and in some places exhibition in legitimate movie houses.

After Holmes experienced setbacks due to drug and legal problems, Leslie inherited the mantle of the porn industry's top male superstar with the success of Talk Dirty To Me in 1980. He eventually starred in over 600 porn films before making the transition to director.

== Early life ==
Leslie was born into an Italian-American family in East Liverpool, Ohio, on January 25, 1945. He grew up in the Midland area of Beaver County, Pennsylvania. After graduating from high school, he worked at Crucible Steel Company before moving to New York to attend Art Students League of New York. After finishing art school, he joined the band Brooklyn Blues Busters, where he played harmonica and sang. Later the band relocated to Michigan. In 1973, the band played at the Ann Arbor Blues and Jazz Festival with Victoria Spivey.

== Career ==
In the mid 1970s, Leslie relocated to the Mill Valley area in California and began performing in adult films. His first film was Coming Attractions (1976). He was a performer in almost 300 adult films and won numerous awards during his days as a performer. He appeared with some of the era's most noted porn stars, including fellow Ohioans Traci Lords and John "Johnny Wadd" Holmes, as well as Seka, Kay Parker, and Annette Haven. His most noteworthy roles were in Obsessed (1977), Desires Within Young Girls (1977), A Coming of Angels (1977), Dracula Sucks (aka Lust At First Bite) (1978), Pretty Peaches (1979), Insatiable (1980), Nothing To Hide (1981), and Talk Dirty To Me, Part II (1982).

Leslie was one of the first porn actors to make the transition from performing to directing, beginning with 1987's Nightshift Nurses; he then went on to direct more than 90 adult movies, including The Chameleon (1989), Curse of the Catwoman (1992), Dog Walker (1994), and Drop Sex (1997), along with the Voyeur, Fresh Meat, and Crack Her Jack series. He won many awards for his work behind the cameras as well. Despite much of his later work being in the gonzo genre in keeping with current trends in adult video — such as the "Fresh Meat" and "Crack Her Jack" series — Leslie continued to make feature films, or "sex dramas". In 2007 he directed the film Brianna Love, Her Fine, Sexy Self. Leslie was a member of the AVN, and XRCO Halls of Fame.

== Death ==
John Leslie died of a heart attack at the age of 65 on December 5, 2010, at his home in Mill Valley, California. Leslie was one of several former porn stars featured in the 2012 documentary After Porn Ends, which was about life after being a porn actor. His final appearance was posthumously in the 2016 documentary X-Rated 2: The Greatest Adult Stars of All Time.

== Awards ==
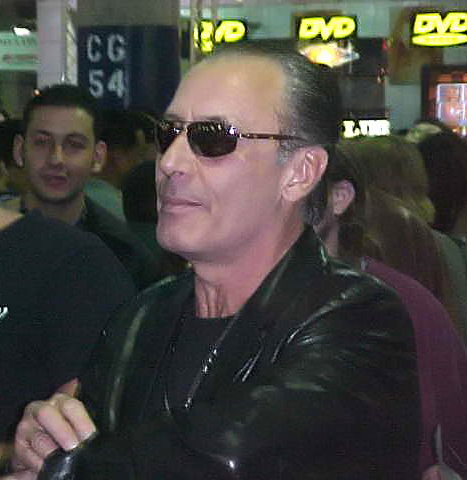
John Leslie in 2000

As a performer:

- 1977 AFAA Award - Best Supporting Actor (Coming of Angels)
- 1980 AFAA Award - Best Actor (Talk Dirty to Me)
- 1980 CAFA Award - Best Actor (Talk Dirty to Me)
- 1981 AFAA Award - Best Actor (Wicked Sensations)
- 1982 AFAA Award - Best Actor (Talk Dirty to Me 2)
- 1982 CAFA Award - Best Actor (Talk Dirty to Me 2)
- 1984 AFAA Award - Best Actor (Dixie Ray & Every Woman has a Fantasy) - tied with himself for both movies
- 1984 XRCO Award - Best Copulation Scene (Every Woman has a Fantasy)
- 1985 AFAA Award - Best Supporting Actor (Taboo 4)
- 1985 AVN Award - Best Supporting Actor, Film (Firestorm)
- 1986 XRCO Award - Best Actor (Every Woman has a Fantasy 2)
- 1988 AVN Award - Best Actor, Film (Firestorm 2)
- 1988 XRCO Award - Best Actor (Beauty and the Beast)

As a director:

- 1987 XRCO Award - Best Director, Video (Nightshift Nurses)
- 1988 XRCO Award - Best Director (Catwoman)
- 1989 AVN Award - Best Director, Video (Catwoman)
- 1992 XRCO Award - Best Film (Chameleons: Not The Sequel)
- 1994 XRCO Award - Best Film (Dog Walker)
- 1994 XRCO Award - Best Director
- 1995 AVN Award - Best Director, Film (Dog Walker)
- 1995 AVN Award - Best Director, Video (Bad Habits)
- 1997 AVN Award - Best All-Sex Release (John Leslie's Fresh Meat 3)
- 1997 XRCO Award - Best Director
- 1998 AVN Award - Best All-Sex Release (John Leslie's Fresh Meat 4)
- 1998 XRCO Award - Best Director
- 1999 AVN Award - Best All-Sex Release (John Leslie's Fresh Meat 5)
- 1999 AVN Award - Best Director, Video (The Lecher 2)
- 2000 AVN Award - Best All-Sex Release (The Voyeur 12)

Other awards:

- 1989 AVN Award - Best Screenplay, Video (Catwoman) with Mark Weiss
- 1995 AVN Award - Best Screenplay, Film (Dog Walker)

== Literature ==
- Nicolas Barbano: Verdens 25 hotteste pornostjerner (Rosinante, Denmark 1999) ISBN 87-7357-961-0: Features a chapter on him.
