= Pussycat Theaters =

Chain of adult movie theaters

The Pussycat Theaters were a chain of adult movie theaters, operating between the 1960s and the 1980s. Pussycat Theaters had 30 locations in California and were known for their cat-girl logo. The last one closed in 2022.

== History ==
David F. Friedman and Dan Sonney founded Pussycat Theaters. Dan Sonney invented the name, based on Woody Allen film What's New Pussycat. Friedman has also cited the Pink Pussycat burlesque club on Santa Monica Boulevard as having previously established the word "pussycat" in relation to "pink" porn, since the early 1960s. The first Pussycat Theater opened in March 1966 on 444 South Hill Street, Los Angeles. Within two years, there were almost a dozen locations, from San Diego to San Francisco.

In 1968, Vince Miranda bought a 50% share of the company. Miranda was unable to prevent those outside California from using the Pussycat name. Miranda spent $1 million to improve the decor of the theaters. They were known for being cleaner and fancier than other such places. The interiors featured red and gold carpeting, velveteen fixtures, beveled glass, mirror walls, chandeliers, oil paintings, murals, and merchandise bearing the Pussycat logo. Some Pussycat theaters sold popcorn from the box office to pedestrians on the sidewalk, with no obligation to buy a ticket.

Vince Miranda and George Tate (who were lovers) shared ownership of Walnut Properties, the company that owned the Pussycat Theaters. Miranda may have had exclusive California license to show Deep Throat, a hugely lucrative film. His main competitors were the Mitchell brothers in San Francisco.

Residents who lived near the theaters complained to the city governments that children could see the images of women on posters, ads, and cardboard stand-ups. Community members wanted the theaters to close. The citizens groups and government sued Walnut Properties under a variety of laws, including obscenity, public nuisance, rezoning, eminent domain, The Red Light Abatement Act, and the US Supreme Court's "preponderance" redefinition of porn theaters. Walnut Properties was served with over 100 civil lawsuits filed between 1973 and 2005. Between 1977 and 1994, at the Pussycat Theater in Santa Monica, "the Los Angeles Police Department made 2000 arrests for lewd conduct on the premises." In 1981, an ordinance was passed banning adult movie theaters in Santa Monica.

In 1983, pornographic videotape sales began to compete with adult theaters, reducing theater attendance. At the age of 52, Vince Miranda died of complications related to cancer in 1985. George Tate and his new paramour Jonathan Cota inherited Walnut and the Pussycat Theaters. The IRS imposed a federal tax lien of $6,047,760 on Miranda's estate. The theaters were losing money fast. Many theaters were given to debtors in lieu of money, and/or converted to general admission theaters.

By 2003, all the theaters were gone except one at 7734 Santa Monica Boulevard in West Hollywood. Filmmaker Roger Corman saved the last Pussycat Theater by brokering a deal with an unnamed buyer. In 2004, Cota threatened to file a lawsuit against the Pussycat Dolls, for trademark infringement on the Pussycat name. The U.S. Patent and Trademark Office ruled that the Pussycat had abandoned the trademark, and the case was dismissed. The last remaining Pussycat Theater showed homosexual pornography. The name was changed to the Tomkat, then to Studs. It went out of business on October 29, 2022.
