= Henri Pachard =

American erotic film director (1939–2008)

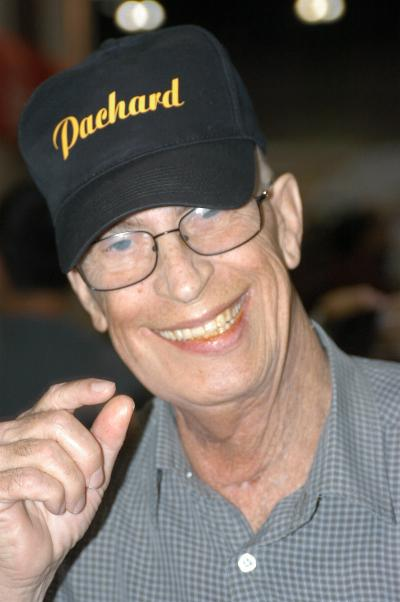
- Henri Pachard at the 2006 Erotica Los Angeles convention
- Born: Ronald Sullivan; June 4, 1939; Kansas City, Missouri
- Died: September 27, 2008 (aged 69); California
- Other names: Jackson St. Louis, Crystal Blue
- Occupation: Director

Henri Pachard, Jackson St. Louis and Crystal Blue were the pseudonyms of the American film director Ron Sullivan (June 4, 1939 – September 27, 2008).

In the late 1960s, using his real name, Sullivan directed a number of sex-and-sadism Sexploitation films for the then-thriving 42nd Street grindhouse market. Working for Sam Lake Enterprises in New York, he directed his first film, Lust Weekend (1967). This was followed by The Bizarre Ones (1967), Scare Their Pants Off (1968), and This Sporting House, with future adult star Jennifer Welles, in 1969.

In the 1980s he adopted the alias "Henri Pachard". From then until his death in 2008, he produced and directed dozens of mainstream pornographic films, including The Devil in Miss Jones 2 and Blame it on Ginger, starring Ginger Lynn.

He also made numerous bondage-discipline features, particularly for the long-running Dresden Diary series, and many spanking fetish videos such as Blazing Bottoms and Smarty Pants! (both for LBO Entertainment).

In addition to directing, he also acted in small character roles in adult films, most notably, Glen and Glenda (1994), a pornographic spoof of Ed Wood's 1953 movie Glen or Glenda.

In May 2008 it was reported that Sullivan/Pachard was gravely ill from cancer, with an open call to others in the industry to employ his wife Deloras as a cameraman or as a film editor to help offset his medical expenses.

He died at his home on September 27, 2008, after a three-year battle with cancer.

== Awards ==
- 1979 AFAA Award - Best Director - Babylon Pink
- 1983 AFAA Award - Best Director - The Devil in Miss Jones Part II
- 1985 AVN Award – Best Director (Video) – Long Hard Nights
- 1985 XRCO Award - Best Director - Taboo American Style
- 1986 CFAA Award - Best Director - Taboo American Style
- 1988 AVN Award – Best Director (Video) – Talk Dirty to Me, Part V
- 1990 AVN Award – Best Director (Film) – The Nicole Stanton Story, Parts 1 & 2
- 1997 XRCO Hall of Fame inductee
- AVN Hall of Fame inductee
