= Femmes de Sade =

1976 film by Alex de Renzy

Theatrical poster

Femmes de Sade is a 1976 adult rape and revenge film directed by Alex de Renzy.

The film shows the parallel adventures of Rocky de Sade (Ken Turner) and Johny (John Leslie). Rocky de Sade is a 7-foot-tall (2.1 m) ex-convict who terrorizes San Francisco's prostitutes, while Johny is a sex shop worker who has wild sexual fantasies. The two characters' stories meet in the last scene, a costume sex party. At the party Rocky de Sade is chained to the floor, where he is urinated and defecated on by prostitutes in revenge for their treatment by him.

In 1988, the film was one of the first to be inducted into the XRCO Hall of Fame.
