= Veronica Hart =

American pornographic actress

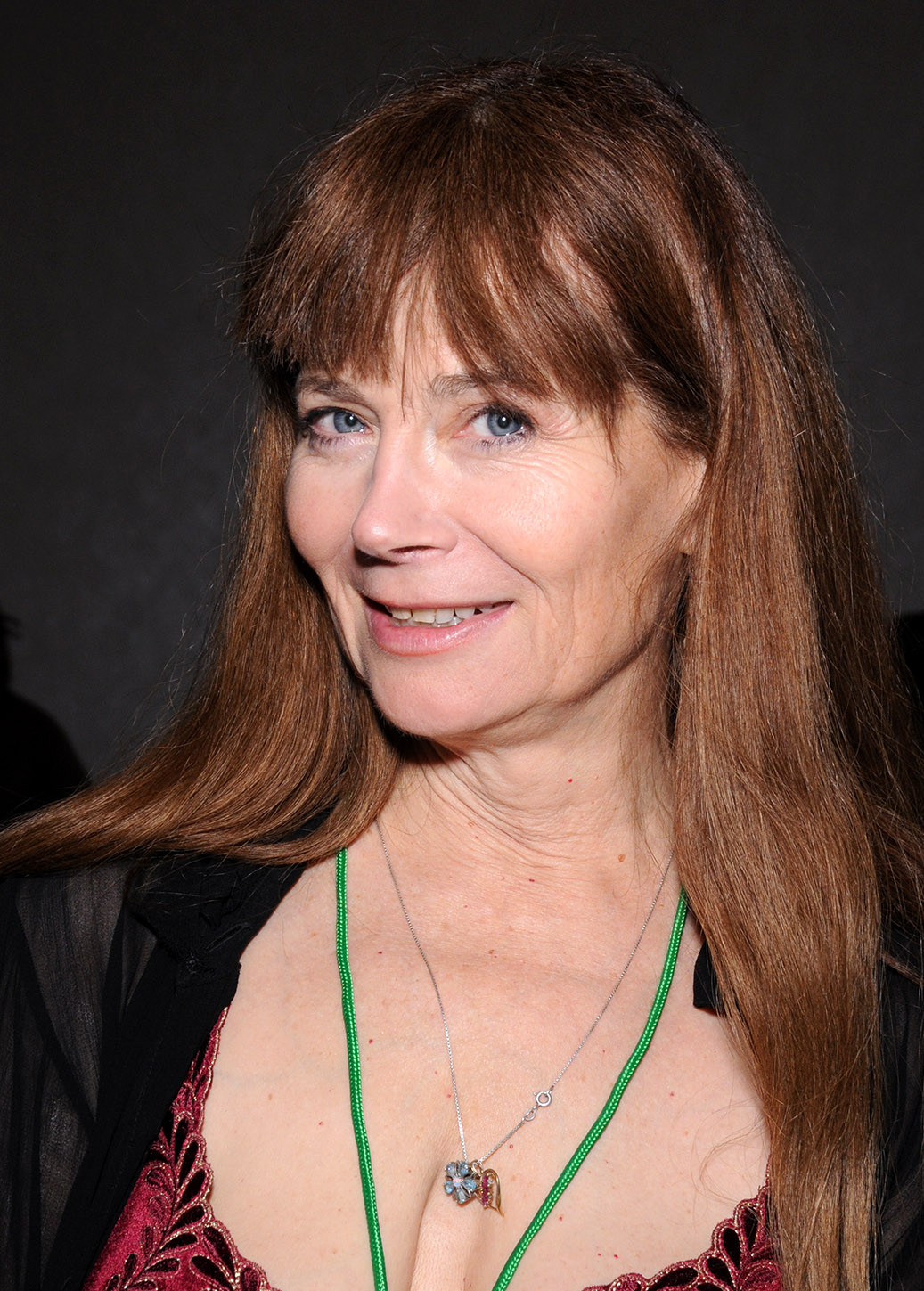
- Hart in 2014
- Born: Jane Hamilton; 1956 or 1957 (age 69–70); Las Vegas, Nevada, U.S.
- Education: University of Nevada, Las Vegas
- Occupations: Film director; pornographic film actress
- Children: 2
- Website: Veronicahart.biz

Jane Hamilton (born 1956 or 1957) is an American film director and former pornographic film actress who performed under the stage name Veronica Hart. Described by columnist Frank Rich as "a leading porn star of the late '70s and early '80s", Hart is a member of the AVN Hall of Fame. Director Paul Thomas Anderson has called her "the Meryl Streep of porn."

== Early life and education ==
Hart was born and raised in Las Vegas, Nevada. She graduated from the University of Nevada, Las Vegas in 1976 with a bachelor's degree in theater arts. After school she worked in England before returning to the United States and moving to New York City.

== Career ==
Hart began appearing in pornographic films in the 1970s, becoming a major star by the 1980s. According to film scholar Chuck Kleinhans, she portrayed the "stylish 'native New Yorker'" type. She is best known for her performances in Amanda by Night, Wanda Whips Wall Street, Roommates and A Scent of Heather. She left the adult film industry in 1982, eventually returning as a producer and director.

Around 1984, Hart began directing segments on the Playboy TV series Electric Blue, appearing in B movies and working as a stripper to support her family. After retiring from performing in pornographic films, Hart became an executive at film distributor VCA Pictures. For VCA, Hart directed a series of comeback features for friend and fellow pornographic film actress Ginger Lynn. With the sale of VCA to Hustler Video in 2003, and the direction of the company moving from feature, storyline-driven films to gonzo, she left the company when her existing contract expired. Afterwards, Hart moved on to other work, including working as a tour guide at the Erotic Heritage Museum in Las Vegas.

Hart has acted in off-Broadway theater productions such as The House of Bernarda Alba, A Thurber Carnival, The Dyke And The Porn Star, and The Deep Throat Sex Scandal.

She has also made appearances in non-pornographic films. She played "Telephone Trixie" in Ruby and a judge in the film Boogie Nights (1997), directed by Paul Thomas Anderson. She appeared as a fictionalized version of herself in the sci-fi/horror comedy film One-Eyed Monster (2008), directed by Adam Fields.

As of 2014 Hart had become a sex educator in China. An article in AVN magazine stated that she has been instructing women through an arrangement with a chain of adult retail stores and clubs called Sediva Maison.

== Personal life ==
Hart has two sons who attended magnet schools for highly gifted students.

== Selected TV appearances ==
- Six Feet Under, Jean Louise Macarthur a.k.a. Viveca St. John - in season 1's episode "An Open Book" (2001)
- Lady Chatterly's Stories, Amy (as Jane Hamilton) - in the episode "The Manuscript" (2001)
- First Years, Lola - in the episode "Porn in the USA" (2001)

== Awards ==
Wins

- 1981

AFAA for Best Actress – Amanda by Night

- 1982

AFAA Award for Best Actress – Roommates

AFAA Award for Best Supporting Actress – Foxtrot

- 1991

XRCO Hall of Fame

- 1994

Free Speech Coalition Lifetime Achievement Award

- 1996

AVN Award for Best Non-Sex Performance – Nylon

AVN Hall of Fame

- 1999

XRCO Award for Best Video - Torn (directed and produced by Hart)

- 2004

XRCO Award for Best Comedy or Parody - Misty Beethoven: The Musical (directed, edited and produced by Hart)

- 2006

Porn Block of Fame

Nominations

- 2001

AVN Best Director – Video for White Lightning

- 2002

AVN Best Director – Film for Taken

- 2003

AVN Best Director – Video for Crime and Passion

- 2004

AVN Best Director – Film for Barbara Broadcast Too

- 2005

AVN Best Director – Film for Misty Beethoven: The Musical

- 2006

AVN Best Non-Sex Performance for Eternity

- 2007

AVN Best Non-Sex Performance for Sex Pix

- 2008

AVN Best Non-Sex Performance for Delilah

- 2009

AVN Best Non-Sex Performance for Roller Dollz
