= Harold Lime =

American pornographic film director

Edward E. "Ted" Paramore III (January 13, 1928 – July 8, 2008) was an American pornographic film director best known by his stage name Harold Lime. His father was screenwriter Edward E. Paramore Jr.

Reuben Sturman mentored Lime and financed several of his films, including The Ecstasy Girls, Amanda by Night, and Society Affairs.

== Filmography ==
- Not Tonight Henry (1960)
- Everybody Loves It (1964)
- The Agony of Love (1966)
- The Girl with the Hungry Eyes (1967)
- The Ribald Tales of Robin Hood (1969)
- Wild Riders (1971)
- The Dirty Dolls (1973)
- Young Secretaries (1974)
- The Decline and Fall of Lacey Bodine (1975)
- Desires Within Young Girls (1977)
- Untamed (1978)
- Sensual Encounters of Every Kind (1978)
- The Ecstasy Girls
- Co-Ed Fever (1980)
- Hotline (1980)
- Indecent Exposure (1981)
- Amanda by Night (1981)
- Center Spread Girls (1982)
- Satisfactions (1982)
- Society Affairs (1982)
- Summer Camp Girls (1983)
- Girls on Fire (1984)
- Sex Play (1984)
- Undressed Rehearsal (1984)
- Dirty Shary (1985)
- Flesh and Ecstasy (1985)
- Amanda by Night 2 (1988)
- Illicit Affairs (1989)
- Naughty Neighbors (1989)
- Chug-a-Lug Girls (1993)
- Babes Illustrated (1994)
- Chug-a-Lug Girls 5 (1994)
- Erotic Obsession (1994)
- Never Say Never (1994)
- Never Say Never, Again (1994)
- No Man's Land 9 (1994)
- Wild & Wicked 4 (1994)
- Babes Illustrated 3 (1995)
- Babes Illustrated 4 (1995)
- Erotic Appetites (1995)

== Awards ==
- 1989 AVN Award – Best Screenplay (Film) – Amanda by Night II
- AVN Hall of Fame
- XRCO Hall of Fame
