= The Devil in Miss Jones =

1973 American pornographic film directed by Gerard Damiano

- The theatrical release poster.
- Directed by: Gerard Damiano
- Written by: Gerard Damiano
- Produced by: Gerard Damiano; Harry Reems
- Starring: Georgina Spelvin
- Cinematography: Harry Flecks
- Edited by: Gerard Damiano
- Music by: Alden Shuman
- Distributed by: VCX Ltd.; MB Productions
- Release date: March 28, 1973
- Running time: 62 minutes
- Country: United States
- Language: English
- Box office: $15 million (US theatrical gross rental)

The Devil in Miss Jones is a 1973 pornographic film, written, directed and produced by Gerard Damiano, which was compared to the 1944 play No Exit by French philosopher Jean-Paul Sartre. Starring Georgina Spelvin and Harry Reems, it is widely regarded as a classic adult film, released during the Golden Age of Porn (1969–1984). After his 1972 success with Deep Throat, Damiano shot the film in a converted apple-packing plant in Milanville, Pennsylvania.

Alongside Deep Throat and Behind the Green Door, The Devil in Miss Jones is associated with a time in American culture known as "porno chic", in which adult erotic films were just beginning to be widely released, publicly discussed by celebrities (like Johnny Carson and Bob Hope) and taken seriously by film critics (like Roger Ebert). The film went on to spawn numerous remakes and sequels.

As with many films of the Golden Age of Porn, the copyright status of The Devil in Miss Jones is unresolved. VCX claims a copyright; rival distributor Arrow Productions distributed unauthorized copies for a time before 2009, when (as part of a mutual truce between the companies) Arrow agreed to accept VCX's claim in exchange for not challenging Arrow's claim on Deep Throat.

== Plot ==
Fed up with life, Justine Jones, a lonely and depressed spinster, decides that suicide is the only way out of her routinely dull existence. She slits her wrists with a shaving blade while bathing, and dies.

The angel Abaca informs Jones that although she has lived a "pure" life, her suicide has disqualified her from entering Heaven, and she must spend eternity in Limbo. Angered that her sole indiscretion has left her with only the options of Limbo or Hell, Jones begs Abaca to let her "earn" her place in Hell by being allowed to return to Earth and become the embodiment of Lust. After an intense session of pain and pleasure with a menacing man, known only by the title of "The Teacher", Justine has several bizarre and sexually deviant encounters, the last of which is a graphic threesome.

Just as Jones is enjoying her new life of lust, the time she was given to fulfill herself runs out, and she is faced with eternity in Hell. Though initially horrified at the pain she will be forced to endure, Abaca dispels the common human myth of Hell, promising Jones that she will in fact be "quite comfortable". Now a raging sex addict, Jones is confined to a small room with an impotent man who is more interested in catching flies than her. She desperately begs the man for sex, but he merely asks her to be quiet while he listens for the buzzing of the insects.

== Cast ==
- Georgina Spelvin as Justine Jones
- John Clemens as Abaca
- Harry Reems as The Teacher (as Harry Reams)
- Marc Stevens as Second Guy with Justine (as Mark Stevens)
- Levi Richards as Third Guy with Justine (as Rick Livermore)
- Judith Hamilton as First Girl with Justine (as Claire Lumiere)
- Sue Flaken as Second Girl with Justine
- Gerard Damiano as Man in Cell (as Albert Gork)

== Georgina Spelvin ==
At the time of production, Spelvin was 36. The Devil in Miss Jones was one of her first acting appearances following a career as a chorus girl on Broadway where she was featured in productions such as Cabaret, Guys and Dolls, Sweet Charity, and The Pajama Game.

Her role in The Devil was typical of her career, as she often played celibate spinsters who have a sexual awakening, then become sex fiends (e.g. Sleepyhead). She also meets a tragic end in several of her other films. The film marked the debut of her moniker Georgina Spelvin, a reference to George Spelvin, a traditional stagename used to hide a performer's identity, for any number of reasons. According to her interview on Dave's Old Porn, Spelvin also did the craft services and cooking on the set. The actress billed in the movie as Claire Lumiere was hired to do craft services only, but was offered $100 to do a lesbian scene with Spelvin, which she accepted.

In an audio interview with The Rialto Report in 2013, Spelvin spoke about how she and Lumiere were lovers at the time, and they accepted the adult film work as a means of raising money for their film collective.

== Box office ==
The movie was given an X rating by the MPAA and premiered at the 57th Street Playhouse in New York City. In many theaters it was shown after Deep Throat as part of a double bill. The Devil in Miss Jones broke the box office record for a pornographic film. It was more commercially successful than both Deep Throat and Behind the Green Door, and successfully competed against mainstream films. It earned $15 million in gross rental at the U.S. box office, making it the tenth most successful film of 1973, just behind Paper Moon with Ryan O'Neal and Live and Let Die with Roger Moore.

== Critical reception ==
As with the other films of the porno chic era, it was reviewed by the film critics of mainstream newspapers. The film's review in Variety said, "With The Devil in Miss Jones, the hard-core porno feature approaches an art form, one that critics may have a tough time ignoring in the future", and compared its finale to Jean-Paul Sartre's play No Exit. The review went on to say, "Damiano has expertly fashioned a bizarre melodrama", and described the opening scene as "a sequence so effective it would stand out in any legit theatrical feature". It finished by stating, "Booking a film of this technical quality into a standard sex house is tantamount to throwing it on the trash heap of most current hard-core fare."

According to Peter Michelson, there is "a relatively small corpus of [pornographic] films—e.g., Deep Throat, Devil in Miss Jones, Behind the Green Door—that have a minimal but still sufficient artistic interest to distinguish themselves from the rest of the genre".

Other critics have described it as, along with Deep Throat, one of the "two best erotic motion pictures ever made". Roger Ebert gave Deep Throat a no-stars rating, but described The Devil in Miss Jones as the "best" of the genre he had seen and gave it three stars out of a possible four. He wrote that the relatively high production values and storytelling were partly the reason for his positive review, but that Spelvin's performance was the main draw: "she is not only the best, but possibly the only, actress in the hard-core field. By that I mean when she's on the screen, her body and actions aren't the only reasons we're watching her. Alone among porno stars, she never seems exploited." Elsewhere (in his December, 1973 review for Behind the Green Door), Ebert wrote: "The only hard-core film I've seen that was effectively erotic was 'The Devil in Miss Jones' — and it was erotic not because of its hard-core content but in spite of it. It worked because its star, Georgina Spelvin, was so able to project emotion, involvement, and abandon. [...] The genius of 'The Devil in Miss Jones' was that the title character had a fictional reality and motivation that made the sex scenes credible."

Gene Siskel of the Chicago Tribune also gave the film three stars out of four and called it "a cut above the average skin flick, and that explains why it has done sensational business in New York and Los Angeles. It has a story. It is well photographed. It has a central character who makes a little sense." Critical reception was not entirely positive. Vincent Canby of The New York Times was negative and called it "a ridiculous new porno film ... which a lot of people, who should have known better, seem to have been conned into finding a breakthrough movie." Charles Champlin of the Los Angeles Times wrote that film left him "at a loss to know how to review. It has a cinematic proficiency 'Deep Throat' lacks and it also has pretensions to a plot. But the plot is still a wraparound for the gymnastics, the appeal is to the hard-core audience and you have the feeling that what is needed is not a review but a second opinion from Masters and Johnson or any competent physiologist."

Filmmaker William Friedkin has called it a "great film", partly because it was one of the few porn films with a proper storyline. It was one of the first films to be inducted into the XRCO Hall of Fame.

== Soundtrack ==
The theme for the film was "I'm Comin' Home", sung by Linda November.

Dialogue was heavily sampled on a track called "The Teacher" by electronic outfit Wave Mechanics in 1991 on the Oh'Zone label - the label who first released the acid house classic "Chime" by British electronic music pioneers Orbital before it became a crossover hit in the UK.

== Home media ==
In 2006, VCX employed Media Blasters to digitally re-master the film from the original 35mm film into a "Definitive Collectors Edition" 2-Disc set on DVD. This latest revision has been repackaged and supposedly has the best picture and audio quality of any original Devil in Miss Jones release. The DVDs contain the remastered feature, audio commentary with director Damiano, a lengthy in-depth interview with Spelvin, the original trailer, the cable TV version, and a photo gallery.

== Sequels and remakes ==
| Year | Title | Director | Writer | The Devil | Miss Jones | Supporting cast | Studio | Notes |
|---|---|---|---|---|---|---|---|---|
| 1982 | The Devil in Miss Jones 2 | Henri Pachard | Ellie Hayward | R. Bolla | Georgina Spelvin | Jacqueline Lorians, Jack Wrangler, Samantha Fox, Anna Ventura, Joanna Storm, Sharon Mitchell, Ron Jeremy | VCA Pictures | A satirical take-off on the original; the title track was performed by Johnny Hartman. |
| 1986 | The Devil in Miss Jones 3: A New Beginning | Gregory Dark | Gregory Dark and Johnny Jump-Up | Jack Baker | Lois Ayres | Careena Collins, Vanessa del Rio, Amber Lynn, Kari Foxx, Tom Byron, Jennifer Noxt, Chanel, Keli Richards, Peter North, Mark Wallice, Paul Thomas, Kevin James has a non-performing role. | VCA Pictures | Winner of Best Film at the 1987 AVN Awards |
| 1986 | The Devil in Miss Jones 4: The Final Outrage | Gregory Dark | Gregory Dark and Johnny Jump-Up | Jack Baker | Lois Ayres | Patti Petite, Kristara Barrington, Keli Richards, Krista Lane, Tamara Longley, Erica Boyer, Paul Thomas, Ron Jeremy, F.M. Bradley and Kevin James | VCA Pictures | Parts 3 & 4 together won 'Best Classic DVD' at the 2000 AVN Awards. |
| 1991 | The Devil in Miss Jones II: The Devil's Agenda | Steve Drake | Steve Drake | Ron Jeremy | Alexandra Quinn | Taylor Wane, Cameo, Randy West, Cal Jammer, Biff Malibu, Jerry Butler | Arrow Productions | While not considered part of the series by some, it is nevertheless is a sequel in which Quinn plays Amanda Jones, who, in limbo after death, must choose between the devil (Jeremy) and an angel (West). Subsequent to this production, Arrow and VCX were involved in a copyright dispute over the original Devil in Miss Jones along with two other Golden Age of Porn films, Deep Throat and Debbie Does Dallas. Both companies continue to sell Devil in Miss Jones. |
| 1995 | The Devil in Miss Jones 5: The Inferno | Gregory Dark | Selwyn Harris | Rip Hymen | Juli Ashton | Amanda Addams, Tammi Ann, Kelly O'Dell, Nicole Lace, Vanessa Chase, Ariana, Rowan Fairmont, Barbara Doll, Rebecca Lord, Serenity, Sindee Coxx, Tom Byron, Dave Cummings, Mark Davis | VCA Pictures | |
| 1999 | The Devil in Miss Jones 6 | Antonio Passolini | Antonio Passolini | Tina Tyler | Stacy Valentine | Vicca, Nikita, Randy Spears, Juli Ashton, Dizzy, Lacey Ogden, Peris Bleu, Anita Cannibal, Scotty Schwartz | VCA Pictures | It won 'Top Renting Release of the Year' at the 2000 AVN Awards. |
| 2005 | The New Devil in Miss Jones | Paul Thomas | Dean Nash and Raven Touchstone | Jenna Jameson | Savanna Samson | Rachel Rotten, Roxanne Hall, Angelica Sin, Vicky Vette, Dick Smothers, Jr., Nick Manning, Tony Tedeschi, Georgina Spelvin | Vivid Entertainment | At the 2006 AVN Awards, the remake dominated, winning Best Art Direction, Best Cinematography, Best Editing, Best Screenplay, Best Director, Best Actress, Best Film, Best Supporting Actress and Best All-Girl Sex Scene. The film cost $250,000 to produce, which, according to The New York Times film reviewer Mireya Navarro was "Vivid's most expensive (production) yet" and one of the most expensive pornographic productions of all time. Spelvin, star of the original film, then nearly 70 years old, took a non-sexual role as a cleaning woman and mentor to the new Miss Jones. |
| 2010 | The Devil in Miss Jones: The Resurrection | Paul Thomas | Raven Touchstone | Savanna Samson | Belladonna | Penny Flame, Carmella Bing, Rebeca Linares, Victoria Sin, Kurt Lockwood, Nick Manning, Steven St. Croix, Evan Stone, Tom Byron | Vivid Entertainment | Despite several nominations at the 2011 AVN Awards, it didn't win any. |

== See also ==
- List of American films of 1973
- List of films about angels
- List of mainstream movies with unsimulated sex
