= Annette Haven =

American pornographic film actress

- Occupation: Pornographic film actress
- Years active: 1973–present

Annette Haven is an American pornographic film actress, one of the stars of the adult film industry during its expansion in the 1970s and 1980s.

== Biography ==
Haven was introduced to the sex industry through a role in a film called Lady Freaks in 1973 starring Holiday. Annette Haven went on to work in nearly 100 porn movies, including Desires Within Young Girls (1977), Barbara Broadcast (1977), A Coming of Angels (1977), Obsessed (1977), Sex World (1977), Dracula Sucks (aka Lust At First Bite) (1978), Maraschino Cherry (1978), Charli (1981) and The Grafenberg Spot (1985).

Haven had a mainstream cameo role in Blake Edwards's 10. Subsequently, she was considered to play the lead female role in Body Double, but the role went to Melanie Griffith because Brian De Palma believed she gave a better dramatic screen test than Haven. Afterwards she became one of the director's consultants for Body Double and was a coach for Griffith. Before filming Body Double De Palma commented, "I'm already thinking of casting. I don't know if there's any good young porno stars out here, but the older ones—Annette Haven, Seka—some of them can really act. And Annette Haven has a terrific body."

Haven is a member of the AVN and XRCO Halls of Fame.

== Awards ==
- AVN Hall of Fame inductee
- XRCO Hall of Fame inductee

== See also ==
- Golden Age of Porn
- List of pornographic film actors who appeared in mainstream films
