= Dan Sonney =

American film director

Dan Sonney (23 January 1915 – 3 March 2002) was a producer and distributor of exploitation films. He was the son of Louis Sonney, who founded Sonney Amusements, the husband of Margaret Sonney, and a long-term business partner of David F. Friedman. He was, for a time, the owner of the mummified corpse of the American outlaw Elmer McCurdy.

In 2001 he co-starred in the documentary Mau Mau Sex Sex along with Friedman.

His father, Louis, was a coal miner-turned-lawman who arrested notorious bank robber Roy Gardner.
