= X-Rated Critics Organization =

United States organization

- Abbreviation: XRCO
- Formation: 1984; 42 years ago
- Location: United States
- Region served: Global
- Website: www.xrco.com

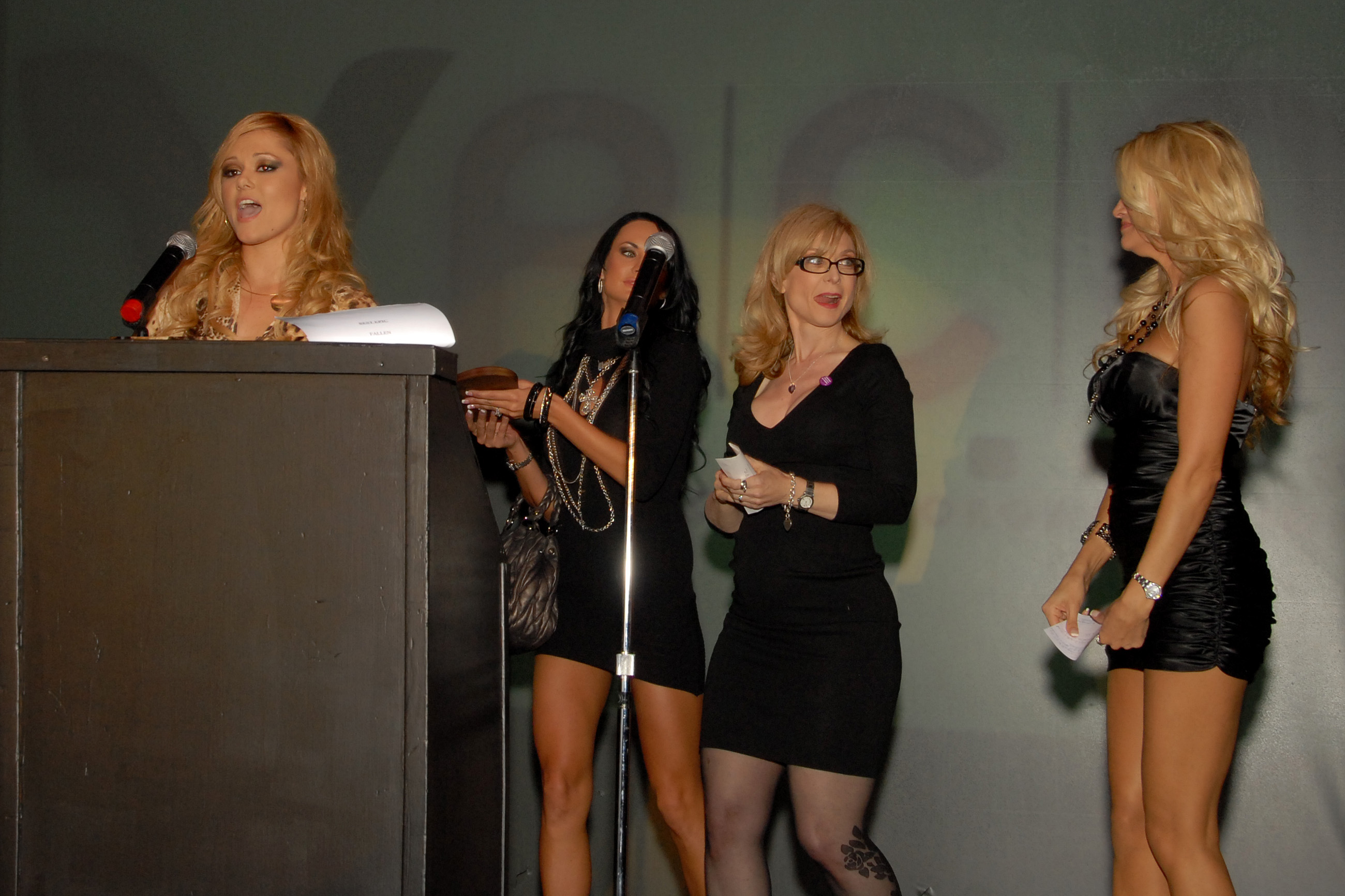
Presenters on-stage for the 25th Anniversary XRCO Awards, Hollywood, California on April 17, 2009. From left to right: Angelina Armani, Alektra Blue, Nina Hartley, Jessica Drake.

The X-Rated Critics Organization (XRCO) is a group of writers and editors from the American adult entertainment industry who each year present awards in recognition of achievement within the industry. After the controversy and criticism of the Best Erotic Scene win for the movie Virgin in 1984 at the Adult Film Association of America awards, the XRCO and its "Heart-On Awards" were founded.

== History ==
The organization was founded in 1984, consisting of writers from Los Angeles, New York City and Philadelphia. Jim Holliday, AVN Award-winning producer and historian, is considered the founding father of the X-Rated Critics Organization. After Holliday's death, the position of XRCO Historian was temporarily filled by XRCO founding member Bill Margold until 2006. James Avalon, a former editor of Adam Film World’s special editions, was also a founding member of XRCO.

XRCO's original Chairman, Jared Rutter, stepped down in 2004 and is now recognized as an "Honorary Chairman". The current co-Chairmen are "Dirty Bob" Krotts and Dick Freeman.

== Members and management ==
In 2005, XRCO added its first European members. Its members now include writers from a wide range of adult publications and Internet sites. Many members work full-time at this occupation; some have university degrees with emphasis on Film Criticism. XRCO members remain active members after being evaluated yearly to determine if they are still active in the adult business, still qualified, and still participating in the XRCO Award nomination and voting processes. Anyone not participating is placed on an "inactive" list for one year and, if found to still be lacking and not participating after that time, are then dropped. There is no membership fee to be an XRCO member.

There are currently 27 award categories, including the XRCO Hall of Fame, which honor the achievements of performers, directors and movies.

== Award program ==
The first XRCO Awards were presented in Hollywood on February 14, 1985. Until 1991, the awards were presented on Valentine's Day each year.

The award program also includes a Hall of Fame ceremony and inductions.
