= Free Speech Coalition =

U.S. trade association for the adult entertainment industry

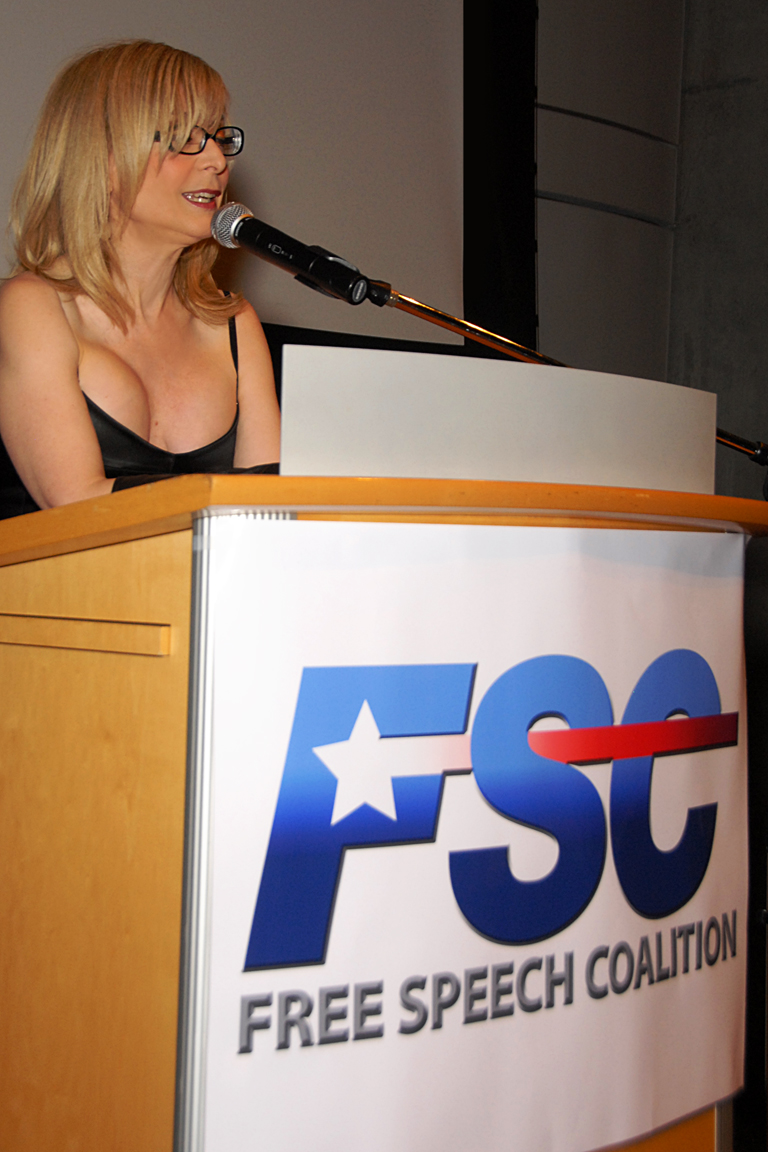
- Nina Hartley delivering opening speech at "Free Speech Coalition Awards Annual Bash Event", Los Angeles, November 2009
- Abbreviation: FSC
- Formation: 1991; 35 years ago
- Purpose: Free speech advocacy, rights of sex industry workers and consumers, political advocacy
- Headquarters: United States
- Official language: English
- Website: freespeechcoalition.com

The Free Speech Coalition (FSC) is a non-profit trade association of the sex industry in the United States. Founded in 1991, it opposes the passage and enforcement of obscenity laws and many censorship laws (with the exception of "anti-piracy" laws).

== Background ==
Prior to the establishment of a private right to own pornographic material in Stanley v. Georgia in 1969, adult film producers and sex toy manufacturers had limited ability to organize. The first truly national group to emerge was the Adult Film Association of America (AFAA), an association of approximately 100 film producers, exhibitors, and distributors. The AFAA hired attorneys and created a legal kit that could be used by those facing censorship. With the advent of inexpensive home videos, the AFAA became the Adult Film and Video Association of America (AFVAA).

In 1987, adult film producer Hal Freeman was charged with pandering. In People v. Freeman, prosecutors argued that paying performers to have sex in an adult film was an act of prostitution. The case went to the California Supreme Court where the 1989 Freeman decision effectively legalized adult film production in California. Despite the ruling, law enforcement began aggressively targeting adult theaters and video stores for selling adult material. In 1990, the City of Los Angeles used zoning ordinances to try and shut down nearly a hundred adult video theaters and shops in the Hollywood area.

Following the recommendations of the Meese Commission, the Bush administration began attacking both small distributors and major manufacturers of adult video with sting operations. Between March 1990 and June 1991, the US Department of Justice and the Los Angeles police raided 40 adult film companies in Los Angeles. While pornography production was no longer illegal in California, producers could still be charged with the federal crime of interstate sale of obscene material and tried in more conservative states.

== Founding ==
In response to the attacks, adult producers formed the Free Speech Legal Defense Fund (FSLDF) to pool resources. In 1991, as the government attack was blunted, the FSLDF decided to select a name more reflective of its broadened role in the adult community, and the Free Speech Coalition was born. The association became closely aligned with other organizations representing the rights of free speech and civil liberties.

== Organization ==
Free Speech Coalition (FSC) is the trade association of the adult entertainment industry in the United States. Founded in 1991, it opposes the passage and enforcement of some censorship laws (with the exception of "anti-piracy" laws) and obscenity laws.

On the FSC's website it states that it has "fought for the rights of producers, distributors, performers and consumers of adult entertainment and pleasure products through battles in the legislature, the courts, regulatory agencies, at the ballot box and in the press".

The FSC is committed to intersectionality, supporting those within the adult industry concerned with issues such as: "women's health and reproductive rights, LGBT rights, immigration, sexual health and wellness, sex education, decriminalization of victims and workers, human trafficking, discrimination, racism, and consent".

In 1999, FSC hired its first full-time Executive Director, William R. "Bill" Lyon, and began to gain a national reputation as a defender of First and Fourth Amendment rights. During the Clinton Administration, there were few obscenity prosecutions. Then-Attorney General Janet Reno seemed to see "obscenity" as a victimless crime. She also realized that in many areas community standards had changed and "obscenity" convictions were becoming more difficult to sustain.

== Issues and initiatives ==
=== Child protection ===
==== Child Protection and Obscenity Enforcement Act ====
In 1995, a comprehensive Federal scheme regulating the creation and wholesale distribution of recorded images of sexual conduct came into effect. Aimed at detecting and deterring child pornography, the Federal Labeling Law (also known as the Child Protection and Obscenity Enforcement Act) eliminated privacy in the creation of sexual images. Any producers of, and performers in, such materials were ordered to comply with detailed disclosure requirements. The FSC played a critical role in industry compliance as it conducted training seminars, prepared compliance documents and uniform exemption labels and negotiated with the Justice Department for relief from some components of the law.

==== Communications Decency Act ====
In 1996 the Communications Decency Act (CDA) was enacted to protect children from accessing adult material on the Internet.

==== Child Pornography Prevention Act ====
The Child Pornography Prevention Act (CPPA) followed in 1997; this sought to criminalize the depiction of minors in sexually explicit video or online content, even if those depicted were over 18 years of age. This redefinition of child pornography to include adults appearing to be minors and engaging in actual or simulated sexual activity was controversial. Although the Senate Judiciary Committee (the committee of origin), never held a vote on the bill, it was signed into law, following Senator Orrin Hatch (R-Utah) attaching it during the Conference Committee to the October 1997 Spending Bill.

For the first time since its own redefinition as a trade association, FSC undertook litigation challenging the constitutionality of a Federal statute, filing suit against then-Attorney General John Ashcroft and charging that the CPPA abridged first amendment rights by defining protected speech as obscene or as child pornography. In 2002, FSC views were upheld in the US Supreme Court in Ashcroft v. Free Speech Coalition, the "virtual child porn" case.

In 2005, FSC filed a complaint against the Dept of Justice and then-Attorney General Alberto Gonzales, citing that 18 U.S.C. § 2257 regulations endangered the privacy and safety of performers by allowing private information to be accessed through the record-keeping process; also that 2257 regulations were complicated to the extent that adult producers would be unable to fully comply with the record-keeping system.

The controversial regulations have been an ongoing issue for adult industry producers and the FSC. In February 2009, the United States Court of Appeals for the Sixth Circuit held in Connection Distributing Co. v. Holder that the record-keeping provisions of 18 U.S.C. § 2257 did not violate the First Amendment. A revised set of the § 2257 regulations was released in December 2009, prompting another complaint against the DOJ and Attorney General Eric Holder in 2010.

=== California porn tax ===
In 1994, the FSC retained a lobbyist in Sacramento, California's state capitol. The following year, an excise tax was proposed for all adult products and services, with the proceeds going to collection of the tax, law enforcement and, if anything remained, to rape counseling centers and battered victim shelters. The bill was defeated at its first committee hearing.

=== Performer Availability Screening Services ===
PASS (Performer Availability Screening Services) is a U.S. organization that maintains a database of STI testing results for pornographic actors. The database is intended to help reduce or prevent the spread of STIs in the porn industry. The organization, formerly known as Adult Production Health and Safety Services (APHSS), was developed by the Free Speech Coalition in 2013, following the closure of Adult Industry Medical Health Care Foundation. Performers are tested every fourteen days for HIV, syphilis, gonorrhea, chlamydia, hepatitis B and C and trichomoniasis. According to PASS, there has not been an on-set transmission of HIV on a regulated set since 2004.

During the global COVID-19 pandemic, a special task force met to determine how to incorporate a test for COVID-19. All performers and crew are now tested for COVID-19 with the date of test posted in the PASS database. Researchers have suggested that the PASS testing system may be a model for other industries.

=== Banking access ===
In February 2015, the FSC announced an affiliation with the First Entertainment Credit Union. The arrangement made financial services available to approved production studios employees and their families, primarily in the adult film industry. Diane Duke, CEO of the FSC, noted the "...difficulties faced by industry members that have had their business turned away by other institutions."

=== Other ===
Other initiatives and issues include:

- Challenging 2257 regulations in court (Free Speech Coalition v. Gonzales)
- Opposing the proposed .xxx top-level domain
- Rebutting claims of pornography addiction and harmful "secondary effects" of pornography
- Improving workplace safety
- Fighting piracy including the FSC Anti-Piracy Action Program and two Public Service Announcements
- Supporting the decriminalization of sex work and workers' rights.

== Awards ==
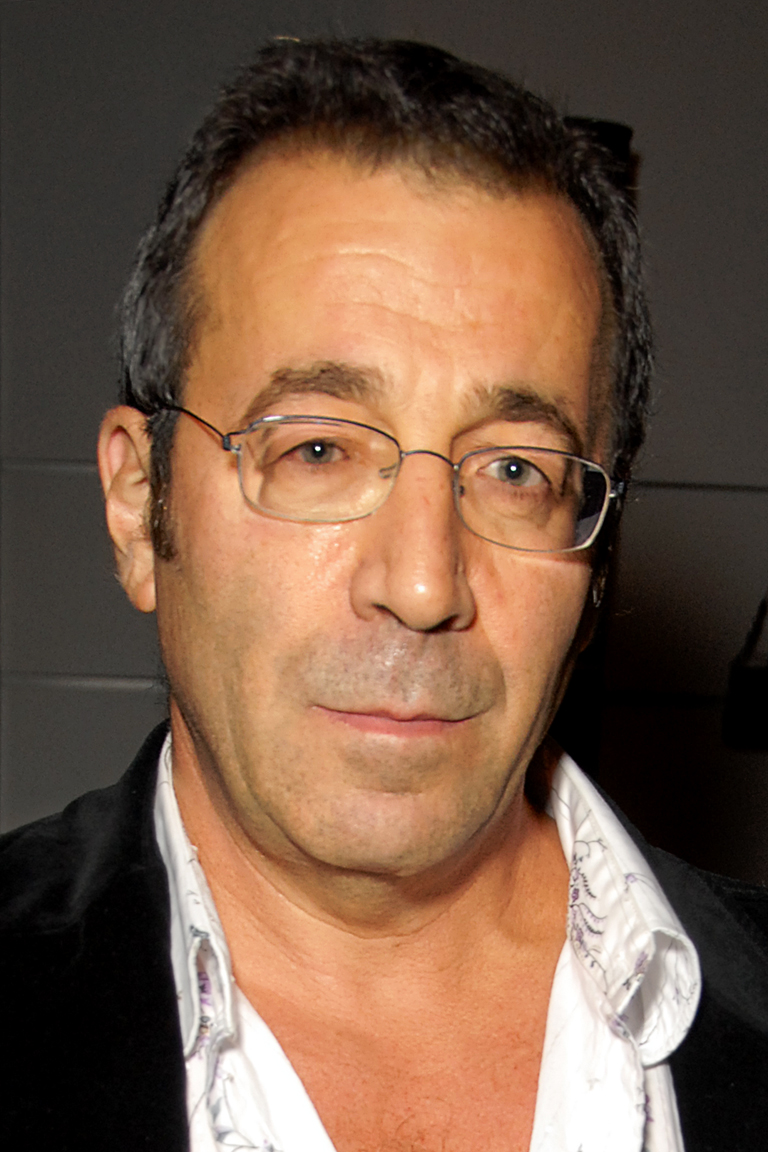
John Stagliano at the FSC Awards Annual Bash Event, November 2009

The FSC Lifetime Achievement Awards are given to adult industry businesses and professionals for outstanding achievements and contributions to the adult entertainment industry. They were launched in mid-1988 by the Adult Video Association at its annual Night of the Stars fundraising event, replacing its discontinued Erotic Film Awards. When the association merged into the Free Speech Coalition in late 1992, the new coalition took over the tradition. Previous years' awards are listed at the AVA Wikipedia entry. Starting in 2008 an "Election Bash" in the fall replaced the former Night of the Stars awards ceremony, reflecting the FSC's change in focus from the entertainers to the business side of the industry. The award presentations were normally made late in the year, but starting in 2014 they were changed to January as part of the XBIZ 360 conference, which is also site of the XBIZ Award ceremony. Thus the awards normally presented in late 2013 were given out in January 2014.

The Positive Image Award is presented to "performers that have helped to dispel negative stereotypes and misconceptions connected to work in the adult industry."

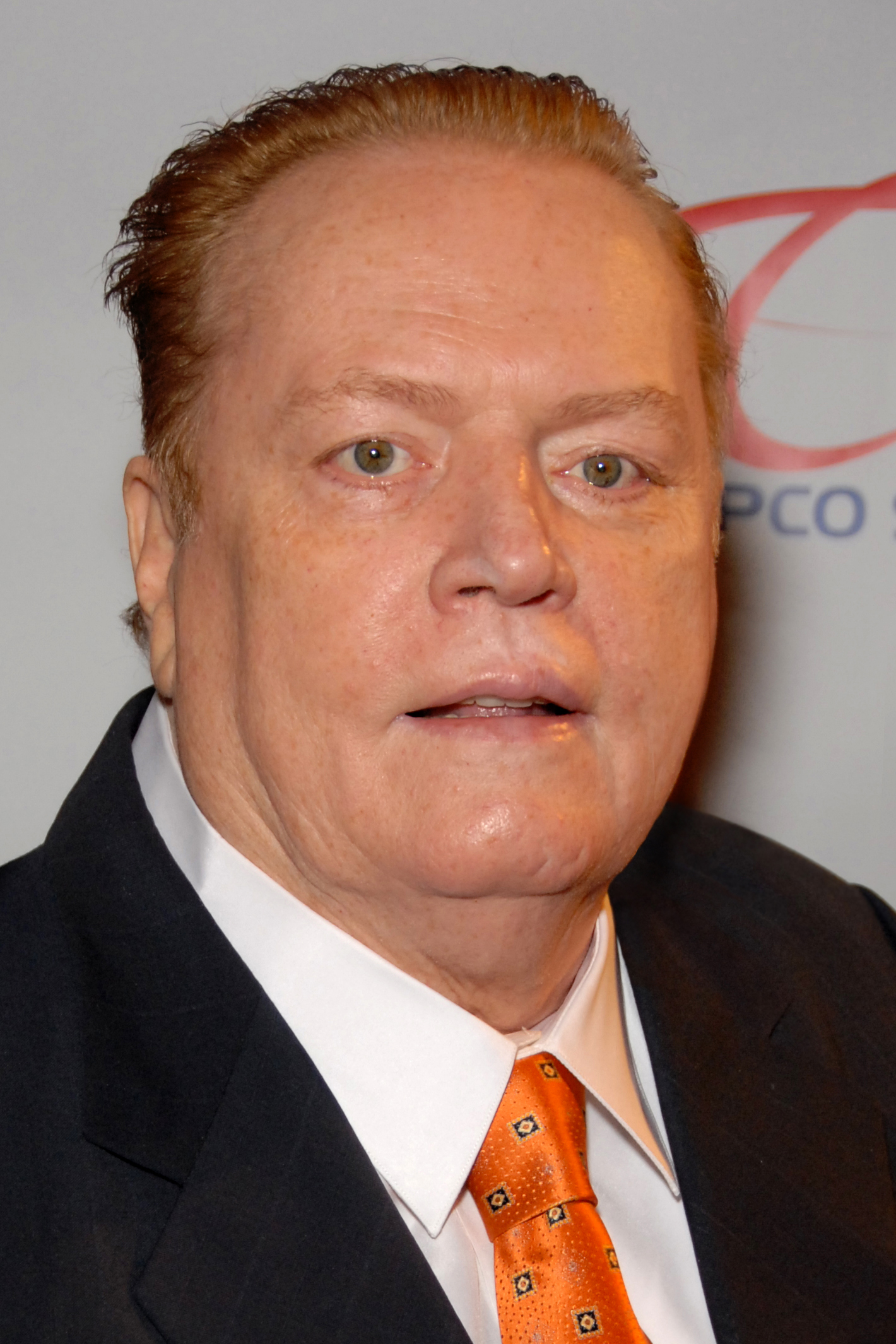
Larry Flynt at the FSC Awards Annual Bash Event, Los Angeles, November 2009

The Legacy Award "recognizes innovation, successful business practices and contributions to the industry as a whole."

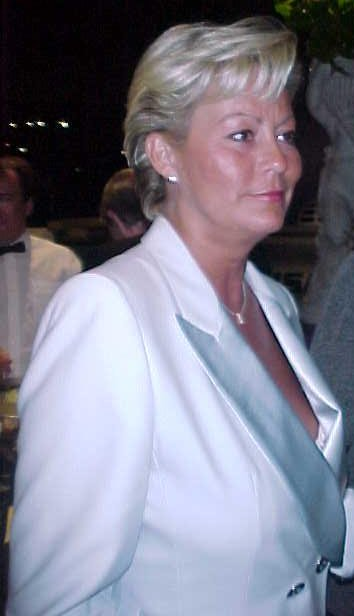
Seka at FSC 13th Annual Night of the Stars dinner, July 2000

The Man of the Year Award is "given to business professionals that have shown exceptional leadership in building solid businesses and their communities."

The Woman of the Year Award is "given to business professionals that have shown exceptional leadership in building solid businesses and their communities."

The Leadership Award is given to "business or individual that demonstrates excellence in the adult entertainment industry in leading by example."

The Benefactor of the Year Award recognizes "unwavering support, through philanthropy and advocacy, of adult industry and mainstream causes. As well as setting a good example, the company also has diligently attempted to protect the adult industry business community from legal challenges, business risks and critics."

Pleasure Products Company of the Year goes to the pleasure products company "that has demonstrated constant and unwavering innovation and excellence." Prior to 2015, the award was known as the Novelty Company of the Year award.

Production Company of the Year "goes to the production company that has demonstrated constant and unwavering innovation and excellence. The company's success not only benefits their individual business but also the industry as a whole. In addition to their creative innovation, the company conducts business with high ethical standards and integrity."

Internet Company of the Year "recognizes excellence, innovation and contributions made to the adult industry overall."

Retailer of the Year "goes to the retailer that has demonstrated constant and unwavering innovation and excellence."

In 2015 a new award, the Christian Mann Courage and Leadership Award, was added. This award is given to "a member of the adult entertainment or pleasure products community who has shown exemplary courage and leadership fighting for the rights and image of the industry."

=== Award winners ===
Year	Category	Winner	Ref.
1988	Lifetime Achievement - Actress	Nina Hartley	
1988	Lifetime Achievement - Actor	Joey Silvera	
1988	Anthony Spinelli Lifetime Achievement - Director	Anthony Spinelli	
1988	Joel T. Warner 'Good Guy' Award	Mike Warner	
1989	Lifetime Achievement - Actress	Sharon Kane	
1989	Lifetime Achievement - Actor	John Leslie	
1989	Anthony Spinelli Lifetime Achievement - Director	Gerard Damiano	
1989	Joel T. Warner 'Good Guy' Award	Al Bloom	
1989	Hal Freeman 'Freedom Isn't Free' Award	Al Goldstein	
1990	Lifetime Achievement - Actress	Kay Parker	
1990	Lifetime Achievement - Actor	Eric Edwards	
1990	Anthony Spinelli Lifetime Achievement - Director	Alex deRenzy	
1990	Joel T. Warner 'Good Guy' Award	Hal Freeman	
1990	Hal Freeman 'Freedom Isn't Free' Award	Bob Guccione	
1991	Lifetime Achievement - Actress	Georgina Spelvin	
1991	Lifetime Achievement - Actor	Paul Thomas	
1991	Anthony Spinelli Lifetime Achievement - Director	Henri Pachard	
1991	Joel T. Warner 'Good Guy' Award	Bobby Lilly & Mel Kamins (GVA-TWN owner)	
1991	Hal Freeman 'Freedom Isn't Free' Award	Barry Freilich	
1992	Lifetime Achievement - Actress	Marilyn Chambers	
1992	Lifetime Achievement - Actor	Herschel Savage	
1992	Anthony Spinelli Lifetime Achievement - Director	Cecil Howard	
1992	Joel T. Warner 'Good Guy' Award	Russ Hampshire (VCA Pictures)	
1992	Hal Freeman 'Freedom Isn't Free' Award	Phil Harvey	
1993	Lifetime Achievement - Actress	Sharon Mitchell	
1993	Lifetime Achievement - Actor	Randy West	
1993	Anthony Spinelli Lifetime Achievement - Director	Chuck Vincent	
1993	Joel T. Warner 'Good Guy' Award	Jacky Hagerman & Harry Mohney	
1993	Hal Freeman 'Freedom Isn't Free' Award	Gloria Leonard	
1994	Lifetime Achievement - Actress	Veronica Hart & Kelly Nichols	
1994	Lifetime Achievement - Actor	Jamie Gillis	
1994	Anthony Spinelli Lifetime Achievement - Director	Fred Lincoln	
1994	Joel T. Warner 'Good Guy' Award	Bill "Pinky" Stolbach (salesman)	
1994	Hal Freeman 'Freedom Isn't Free' Award	Howard Wasserman & Paul Wisner (publisher)	
1995	Lifetime Achievement - Actress	Hyapatia Lee	
1995	Lifetime Achievement - Actor	Mike Horner	
1995	Anthony Spinelli Lifetime Achievement - Director	Bruce Seven	
1995	Joel T. Warner 'Good Guy' Award	Dr. George Boris	
1995	Hal Freeman 'Freedom Isn't Free' Award	Stanley Fleishman	
1996	Lifetime Achievement - Actress	Porsche Lynn	
1996	Lifetime Achievement - Actor	Ron Jeremy	
1996	Anthony Spinelli Lifetime Achievement - Director	Harold Lime & Robert McCallum	
1996	Joel T. Warner 'Good Guy' Award	Ted Rothstein (Nasstoys) & Martin Rothstein (Coast to Coast Video founder)	
1996	Hal Freeman 'Freedom Isn't Free' Award	Eddie Wedelstedt (Goalie Entertainment Holdings founder)	
1997	Lifetime Achievement - Actress	Seka	
1997	Lifetime Achievement - Actor	John Holmes	
1997	Anthony Spinelli Lifetime Achievement - Director	Candida Royalle	
1997	Joel T. Warner 'Good Guy' Award	Robert Tremont	
1997	Hal Freeman 'Freedom Isn't Free' Award	Larry Flynt	
1997	Positive Image Award	Juli Ashton	
1998	Lifetime Achievement - Actress	Vanessa Del Rio	
1998	Lifetime Achievement - Actor	R. Bolla	
1998	Anthony Spinelli Lifetime Achievement - Director	Bob Chinn	
1998	Joel T. Warner 'Good Guy' Award	Marty Turkel	
1998	Hal Freeman 'Freedom Isn't Free' Award	Nadine Strossen	
1998	Positive Image Award	Shane	
1999	Lifetime Achievement - Actress	Annie Sprinkle	
1999	Lifetime Achievement - Actor	Richard Pacheco	
1999	Lifetime Achievement - Gay Actor	Jack Wrangler	
1999	Anthony Spinelli Lifetime Achievement - Director	Bobby Hollander	
1999	Lifetime Achievement - Gay Director	Jerry Douglas	
1999	Hal Freeman 'Freedom Isn't Free' Award	William Dobbs (gay activist, attorney for the Coalition for Free Expression)	
1999	Positive Image Award	Christi Lake	
2000	Lifetime Achievement - Actress	Shanna McCullough	
2000	Lifetime Achievement - Actor	Jon Martin	
2000	Lifetime Achievement - Gay Actor	Matt Bradshaw	
2000	Anthony Spinelli Lifetime Achievement - Director	Lasse Braun	
2000	Lifetime Achievement - Gay Director	John Travis	
2000	Joel T. Warner 'Good Guy' Award	Christian Mann (Evil Angel General Manager) & Susan Colvin (California Exotic Novelties founder)	
2000	Hal Freeman 'Freedom Isn't Free' Award	Dr. James Elias	
2000	Positive Image Award	Sean Michaels	
2001	Lifetime Achievement - Actress	Juliet Anderson	
2001	Lifetime Achievement - Actor	Don Fernando	
2001	Lifetime Achievement - Gay Actor	Cole Tucker	
2001	Anthony Spinelli Lifetime Achievement - Director	John Stagliano	
2001	Lifetime Achievement - Gay Director	Steven Scarborough	
2001	Joel T. Warner 'Good Guy' Award	Paul Fishbein	
2001	Hal Freeman 'Freedom Isn't Free' Award	Randall D.B. Tigue (attorney)	
2001	Positive Image Award	Shayla LaVeaux	
2001	Special Recognition Award	Gloria Leonard	
2002	Lifetime Achievement - Actress	Ginger Lynn	
2002	Lifetime Achievement - Actor	Tom Byron & Peter North	
2002	Lifetime Achievement - Gay Actor	Kevin Williams	
2002	Anthony Spinelli Lifetime Achievement - Director	Radley Metzger	
2002	Lifetime Achievement - Gay Director	Gino Colbert (performer and director)	
2002	Joel T. Warner 'Good Guy' Award	Ron Braverman (Doc Johnson) co-founder	
2002	Hal Freeman 'Freedom Isn't Free' Award	Tom Wahl & Suzi Wahl (small adult website operators)	
2002	Positive Image Award	Dave Cummings	
2003	Lifetime Achievement - Actress	Amber Lynn	
2003	Lifetime Achievement - Actor	Buck Adams	
2003	Lifetime Achievement - Gay Actor	Jim Bentley	
2003	Anthony Spinelli Lifetime Achievement - Director	Kirdy Stevens	
2003	Lifetime Achievement - Gay Director	Joe Gage	
2003	Joel T. Warner 'Good Guy' Award	Charles Brickman (Cinderella Distributors founder) & Larry Ross (promoter/publisher/producer)	
2003	Hal Freeman 'Freedom Isn't Free' Award	H. Louis Sirkin (First Amendment attorney)	
2003	Positive Image Award	Felecia	
2004	Lifetime Achievement - Actress	Christy Canyon	
2004	Lifetime Achievement - Actor	Jesse Adams	
2004	Lifetime Achievement - Gay Actor	Chip Daniels	
2004	Anthony Spinelli Lifetime Achievement - Director	Carter Stevens	
2004	Lifetime Achievement - Gay Director	Chi Chi LaRue	
2004	Joel T. Warner 'Good Guy' Award	Steve Orenstein (Wicked Pictures)	
2004	Hal Freeman 'Freedom Isn't Free' Award	Gary Kremen	
2004	Positive Image Award	Jenna Jameson	
2005	Lifetime Achievement - Actress	Alicia Rio	
2005	Lifetime Achievement - Actor	Johnnie Keyes	
2005	Lifetime Achievement - Gay Actor	Jeff Stryker	
2005	Anthony Spinelli Lifetime Achievement - Director	Jim Holliday	
2005	Lifetime Achievement - Gay Director	Wash West	
2005	Hal Freeman 'Freedom Isn't Free' Award	Mike Moran of (LD Management)	
2005	Positive Image Award	Jim Griffith (Playboy Entertainment Group)	
2006	Lifetime Achievement - Actress	Jill Kelly	
2006	Lifetime Achievement - Actor	Marcus Spencer	
2006	Lifetime Achievement - Gay Actor	Michael Brandon	
2006	Lifetime Achievement - Gay Director	John Rutherford	
2006	Joel T. Warner 'Good Guy' Award	Bob Pyne Sr. (Williams Trading founder)	
2006	Hal Freeman 'Freedom Isn't Free' Award	Lenny Friedlander (New Beginnings owner), Phyllis Heppenstall (Peekay founder), and Dave Cummings	
2006	Advocate Award	Angelina Spencer (ACE National Executive Director)	
2008	Legacy Award	Harry Mohney (Déjà Vu)	
2008	Man of the Year	Scott Coffman (AEBN President and founder)	
2008	Woman of the Year	Rondee Kamins (GVA-TWN CEO)	
2008	Business of the Year	Sureflix Digital Distribution	
2009	Positive Image Award (Male)	Ron Jeremy (rescinded in 2017 due to multiple allegations of sexual assault against him).	
2009	Positive Image Award (Female)	Stormy Daniels	
2009	Legacy Award	Larry Flynt (Hustler founder and Free Speech advocate)	
2009	Man of the Year	John Stagliano (Evil Angel)	
2009	Woman of the Year	Peggy Oettinger (Sinclair Institute president)	
2009	Pleasure Products Company of the Year	Screaming O	
2009	Production Company of the Year	Titan Media	
2009	Internet Company of the Year	Video Secrets (live cam company)	
2010	Leadership Award	Girlfriends Films	
2011	Leadership Award	Colin Rowntree (Wasteland.com CEO)	
2012	Positive Image Award	Steven St. Croix & jessica drake	
2012	Legacy Award	Susan Colvin (California Exotic Novelties founder)	
2012	Man of the Year	Tim Valenti (AEBN, NakedSword)	
2012	Woman of the Year	Theresa Flynt (Hustler)	
2012	Pleasure Products Company of the Year	Sportsheets	
2012	Production Company of the Year	Vivid Entertainment	
2012	Internet Company of the Year	Gamma Entertainment	
2012	Leadership Award	Allison Vivas (Pink Visual CEO)	
2012	Benefactor of the Year	Manwin	
2014	Positive Image Award	James Deen	
2014	Legacy Award	Steven Hirsch (Vivid Entertainment founder)	
2014	Man of the Year	Nick Orlandino (Pipedream Products)	
2014	Woman of the Year	Bonnie Feingold (Honey's Place CEO and president)	
2014	Pleasure Products Company of the Year	California Exotic Novelties	
2014	Production Company of the Year	Hot House Entertainment	
2014	Internet Company of the Year	Gamelink	
2014	Leadership Award	Nina Hartley & Ernest Greene	
2014	Benefactor of the Year	Wicked Pictures	
2014	Retailer of the Year	Lions Den	
2015	Positive Image Award	Chanel Preston (The announcement is unclear as to whether this award was renamed the Performer of the Year Award, or whether the title on the announcement is in error since the description still calls it the Positive Image award.)	
2015	Legacy Award	Phil Harvey	
2015	Man of the Year	Christian Mann	
2015	Woman of the Year	Lorelei Lee	
2015	Pleasure Products Company of the Year	Pipedream Products	
2015	Production Company of the Year	Wicked Pictures	
2015	Internet Company of the Year	Clips4Sale	
2015	Leadership Award	Streamate	
2015	Retailer of the Year	Castle Megastore	
2015	Christian Mann Courage and Leadership Award	Peter Acworth	
2016	Positive Image Award	Ela Darling	
2016	Man of the Year	Steve Orenstein (Wicked Pictures)	
2016	Woman of the Year	Susan Colvin (California Exotic Novelties founder)	
2016	Pleasure Products Company of the Year	Screaming O	
2016	Production Company of the Year	Mile High Media	
2016	Internet Company of the Year	BaDoink.com	
2016	Leadership Award	Frank Kaye & Michael Kaye (Pleasure Productions)	
2016	Retailer of the Year	Good Vibrations	
2016	Christian Mann Courage and Leadership Award	FSC Staff, including Diane Duke, Joanne Cachapero and Julie X	
2016	Legacy Award	Kelly Holland	

The Free Speech Coalition also presents an Award of Excellence at the Cybersocket Web Awards (won in 2010 by CorbinFisher.com)

== See also ==
- Artistic freedom
- Civil and political rights
- Sex workers' rights
- Sex-positive movement
- Sexual Freedom League
- Sexual revolution
- Association of Sites Advocating Child Protection, who created the "Restricted to Adults" meta tag allowing parental controls to block access to pornographic sites on a per-device basis
