= Wadd: The Life & Times of John C. Holmes =

- Film poster
- Directed by: Cass Paley
- Written by: Rodger Jacobs
- Produced by: Cass Paley
- Starring: John C. Holmes; Ron Jeremy; Larry Flynt; Misty Dawn; Aunt Peg; Paul Thomas Anderson; Mike Sager
- Cinematography: Willie Boudevin
- Edited by: Christopher Rowland
- Release date: 1998
- Running time: 120 minutes
- Country: United States
- Language: English

Wadd: The Life & Times of John C. Holmes is a 1998 documentary about adult film icon John C. Holmes produced and directed by Cass Paley. It was the winner of Best Feature Documentary at the 1999 South by Southwest Film Festival held annually in Austin, Texas.

== Synopsis ==
The documentary examines the enemies, friends, and family of adult film icon John C. Holmes and their memories of him. It discusses the creation of the Johnny Wadd film series directed by Bob Chinn. It also covers the romantic relationships of John Holmes with first wife Sharon Holmes and his second wife, the porn actress Misty Dawn. It also covers how he groomed, sexually molested, and trafficked a 15-year-old child, Dawn Schiller. Finally, it covers Eddie Nash and Wonderland murders, as well as Holmes' death from AIDS. It is narrated principally by journalist Mike Sager, whose Rolling Stone story "The Devil and John Holmes" inspired the films Boogie Nights and Wonderland. It has been reformatted in HD for redistribution by The Sager Group LLC.

== Interviews ==
- Bunny Bleu
- Aunt Peg
- Candida Royale
- Kitten Natividad
- Misty Dawn
- Ron Jeremy
- John Leslie
- Don Fernando
- Bob Chinn
- Paul Thomas Anderson
- Larry Flynt
- Sharon Gebenini Holmes
- Bill Amerson
- Mike Sager
- Richard Pacheco
- Al Goldstein
- Seka
- Gloria Leonard
- Annette Haven
- Bobby Hollander
- Sharon Mitchell
- Bill Margold

== Critical reception ==
Owen Gleiberman of Entertainment Weekly wrote, "Often, there's a conspiracy aspect to lost legends, but terrific films do fall through the cracks. Wadd: The Life & Times of John C. Holmes, which played the Toronto film festival and then slipped away, is the ultimate searching – and shocking – exposé of the porn world."

Richard Corliss of Time wrote of the film, "Like Holmes, Wadd is seedy, twisted, a bit on the long side – and creepily fascinating."

Stephen Holden of The New York Times wrote, "Wadd leaves us to ponder the difference between Holmes's special 'gift' and, say, another star's beautiful singing voice. When you come right down to it, they're pretty much the same thing, but distributed to different parts of the body."

Maitland McDonagh of TV Guide commented, "Holmes's story isn't pretty, but it's fascinating, in no small part because the people Paley interviews offer a glimpse into a brief time when making porn was an act of rebellion that attracted a diverse and eccentric group of filmmakers and performers."
