= Prisoner of Paradise =

Prisoner of Paradise may refer to:

- Prisoner of Paradise (1980 film), an American pornographic exploitation film
- Prisoner of Paradise (2002 film), an internationally co-produced documentary film
