= Aberson =

Aberson is a surname. Notable people with the surname include:

- Cliff Aberson (1921–1973), American football and baseball player
- Helen Aberson-Mayer (1907–1999), American children's author

== See also ==
- Amerson
