= The Tale of Tiffany Lust =

1981 film by Radley Metzger

- Original film poster
- Directed by: Radley Metzger (uncredited)
- Written by: Radley Metzger (as "Jake Barnes")
- Produced by: André Lispenard; Radley Metzger (uncredited)
- Starring: Candida Royalle; Désirée Cousteau; Dominique Saint Claire (as "Arlene Manhatten"); George Payne; Ron Jeremy; Samantha Fox; Vanessa del Rio; Veronica Hart
- Cinematography: Gérard Loubeau
- Edited by: Jason Hyatt
- Music by: Olivia Rivas
- Distributed by: VCA Pictures (US); Great Jones Films
- Release dates: June 27, 1979 (France); September 1981 (U.S.)
- Running time: 96 minutes (US)
- Country: United States
- Language: English

The Tale of Tiffany Lust, also known as Body Lust, is a 1979 American pornographic film. It was directed by Radley Metzger but credited for convenience to French director and occasional Metzger collaborator Gérard Kikoïne, who may have served as an advisor. The film was shot in several locations in New York City. It opened in France on 27 June 1979 under the title Dolly l'initiatrice, but was not released in the U.S. until 1981.

The Tale of Tiffany Lust is related to Kikoïne's Aphrodesia's Diary, also shot in New York in 1979 with the same imported French stars, Dominique Saint Claire and Morgane. The two films also have French cinematographer Gérard Loubeau and, less remarkably, American actors and technicians in common. It is probable that they were made consecutively in Winter-Spring 1979. The international cast and crew assembled for Kikoïne's big-budget French-American co-production Aphrodesia were probably reused for Metzger's Tiffany, itself quite lavish by pornographic standards.

The film was released during the Golden Age of Porn (inaugurated by the 1969 release of Andy Warhol's Blue Movie) in the United States, at a time of "porno chic", in which adult erotic films were just beginning to be widely released, publicly discussed by celebrities (like Johnny Carson and Bob Hope) and taken seriously by film critics (like Roger Ebert).

== Premise ==
Betty, a friend, suggests that Tiffany, a housewife seeking a way to enrich her love life, see Florence Nightingale on her radio show where guests are welcome to enjoy erotic activities in front of a live audience. Later, Tiffany discovers that her husband is enjoying similar activities of his own.

== Cast ==
- Candida Royalle as Guest #19
- Désirée Cousteau as Girl in Bar
- Dominique Saint Claire as Tiffany
- George Payne as Tiffany's Husband
- Ron Jeremy as Guest #9
- Samantha Fox as Girl in Sauna
- Vanessa del Rio as Florence Nightgale
- Veronica Hart as Betty
- Morgane as Blonde in Sauna

== Notes ==
According to one film reviewer, Radley Metzger's films, including those made during the Golden Age of Porn (1969–1984), are noted for their "lavish design, witty screenplays, and a penchant for the unusual camera angle". Another reviewer noted that his films were "highly artistic — and often cerebral ... and often featured gorgeous cinematography". Film and audio works by Metzger have been added to the permanent collection of the Museum of Modern Art (MoMA) in New York City.

== See also ==
- Andy Warhol filmography
- Erotic art
- Golden Age of Porn
- Erotic films in the United States
- Erotic photography
- List of American films of 1979
- Sex in film
- Unsimulated sex
