= Club 90 =

American adult film actress support group

- Formation: 1983
- Founders: Veronica Hart; Gloria Leonard; Annie Sprinkle; Candida Royalle; Veronica Vera
- Type: Nonprofit
- Purpose: Adult film actress support group
- Headquarters: New York City, New York, U.S.
- Region served: Worldwide
- Official language: English

Club 90 was an American adult film actress support group founded in 1983.

== Origins ==
In 1983, at pregnant adult film actress Veronica Hart's baby shower, held at fellow porn star Annie Sprinkle's New York City apartment at 90 Lexington, the women of New York's pornographic film industry, including Gloria Leonard, Veronica Vera and Candida Royalle created the first female adult performer emotional support organization.

The group would then meet regularly to offer not only emotional support yet to devise ways of creating their own adult material and exchange contacts.

Adult actresses Sue Nero and Kelly Nichols joined the group and in 1984, shortly after the formation of the organization, Candida Royalle brought a flyer to Club 90 meeting advertising a month-long feminist festival of women artists called "The Second Coming" that was created by the Carnival Knowledge group that feminists founded as a rebuttal to the Moral Majority of the religious right. The event was to be held on Franklin Street, New York City at the Franklin Furnace.

On January 26, 1984, at "The Second Coming," the Club 90 members staged a slightly fictionalized performance piece called, "Deep Inside Porn Stars," which reenacted one of their club meetings, beginning with Annie Sprinkle wearing a chartreuse sparkled dress while in a re-creation of her New York City apartment along with the other members of Club 90.

The final meeting of Club 90 took place in June 2012 at Veronica Vera's and Stu Cottingham's wedding party.

== Club 90 anniversary ==
On February 27, 2015, Royalle, Leonard, Sprinkle, Veronica Hart and Veronica Vera attended "A Tribute to Club 90" celebration at the 12th annual CineKink Film Festival in New York City.
