= Laurie Rose =

Laurie Rose may refer to:

- Laurie Rose, an American actress better known as Misty Dawn
- Laurie Rose (cinematographer), an English cinematographer
