= Désirée Cousteau =

American pornographic film actress (born 1956/57)

- Born: 1956 or 1957 (age 69–70)
- Occupations: Pornographic film actress; striptease artist
- Years active: 1978–1981

Désirée Cousteau (born 1956 or 1957) is a pornographic film actress and striptease artist who was active in the late 1970s and early 1980s. She is best known for her role in the 1978 film Pretty Peaches.

== Career ==
=== Early career ===
Cousteau aspired to model for Vogue, but was told she was not tall or thin enough. After a period modeling lingerie, she appeared in Jonathan Demme's 1974 debut Caged Heat (also known as Renegade Girls). She also posed for Penthouse, appearing in the June 1974 issue as Deborah Clearbranch.

=== Pornographic films ===
Cousteau's porn career began in 1978, when she did sex scenes in four films, initially with the hybrid stage name of Désirée Clearbranch, before taking a more substantial role in Bob Chinn's Hot and Saucy Pizza Girls, in which she has three sex scenes and something of a narrative arc. Pizza Girls was followed a couple months later by Alex de Renzy's Pretty Peaches, a film constructed entirely around Cousteau. It instantly established her as a porn star, a status confirmed when she won the Adult Film Association of America Best Actress Award for her performance the following year.

Other roles quickly followed, most trading on the dizzy naïf persona Cousteau created for Pretty Peaches (whose storyline was distantly derived from Voltaire's Candide). She made around twenty features and loops in 1979, as well as doing photo shoots for magazines such as Hustler and High Society. Cousteau's 1979 credits include scenes in three movies by French director Gérard Kikoïne. One was in the ambitious French-American co-production Aphrodesia's Diary, shot mostly in New York and not released until 1983, but the other two were shot in France (Cousteau's dialogue was dubbed).

Cousteau announced her retirement from porn films in an interview for the TV series Midnight Blue at an event to promote Deep Rub in the latter part of 1979. She appears, however, to have undertaken a few projects after that date, with a handful of loops and features in 1980 and 1981. All later films purporting to involve Cousteau use archival footage.

In her Midnight Blue interview, Cousteau says she prefers striptease, "Because you're on a stage and you never have physical contact with anyone. I never leave the stage. So there's an isolation and a security there that I don't feel with films."

=== After pornography ===
At the time of the Midnight Blue interview, Cousteau was appearing at the Melody Burlesk in New York, which regularly featured porn stars in addition to its house dancers. She performed a one-woman show consisting of dance and striptease followed by audience questions, which also included posing nude for photographs while seated on patrons' laps. By 1981, Cousteau was traveling for three weeks every month to perform at burlesque theaters. During a performance at the Parkway Theater in Milwaukee, Cousteau "was covered with a coat and led off stage" by police, but the district attorney's office declined to prosecute. She later danced topless on New York cable television's The Robin Byrd Show to promote her stage work. After more than a year of physically gruelling live performance and at least two brushes with the law, she appears to have quit the adult entertainment industry by the end of 1981.

Cousteau's films remained staples of the shrinking X-rated cinema circuit in the 1980s and of cable television in the 1990s, as well as of X-rated home video. She was inducted into the XRCO Hall of Fame in 1993, and into the AVN Hall of Fame in 1997.

== Filmography ==
=== 1974 ===
- Caged Heat (1974), by Jonathan Demme (Cousteau is credited as Deborah Clearbranch)

=== 1978 ===
- The China Cat (1978), by Bob Chinn (Cousteau is credited mononymically as Clearbranch)
- Easy (1978), by Anthony Spinelli (Cousteau is credited as Désirée Clearbranch)
- A Formal Faucett (1978), by Fred J. Lincoln (Cousteau is credited as Désirée Clearbranch)
- Telefantasy (1978), by Bob Chinn
- Hot and Saucy Pizza Girls (1978), by Bob Chinn
- Pretty Peaches (1978), by Alex de Renzy

=== 1979 ===
- 800 Fantasy Lane (1979), by Svetlana Mischoff
- Candy Goes to Hollywood (1979), by Gail Palmer
- Aphrodesia's Diary (shot in 1979, released in 1983), by Gérard Kikoïne
- Enquêtes (1979), by Gérard Kikoïne
- Initiation au collège (1979), aka French Finishing School, by Gérard Kikoïne (as Loic Chalmain)
- The Tale of Tiffany Lust (released in France as Dolly l'initiatrice in 1979, released in the U.S. in 1981), by Radley Metzger (credited to Gérard Kikoïne)
- Deep Rub (1979), by Leonard Kirtman (as Leon Gucci)
- Female Athletes (1979), by Leonard Kirtman (as Leon Gucci)
- Getting Off (1979), by Ed De Priest
- Hot Lunch (1979), by John Hayes (as Harold Perkins)
- Hot Rackets (1979), by Gary Graver (as Robert McCallum) (Cousteau is credited as Désirée Clearbranch)
- Inside Désirée Cousteau (1979), by Leonard Kirtman (as Leon Gucci)
- Intimate Illusions (1979), aka Boiling Point, by Gary Graver (as Paul Levis) (Cousteau is credited as Danielle Hunnee)
- Ms. Magnificent (1979), aka Superwoman, by Joe Sherman
- Summer Heat (1979), by Christy McCabe and Charles Webb
- The Ecstasy Girls (1979), by Gary Graver (as Robert Mc Callum)

=== 1980 ===
- Randy (1980), aka Randy the Electric Lady, by Phillip Schuman and Zachary Strong

=== 1981 ===
- Center Spread Girls (shot in 1981, released in 1982), by Gary Graver (as Robert McCulum)
- Delicious (1981), by Bill Milling (as Philip Drexler Jr.)

=== Loops ===
Cousteau also appeared in loop collections such as Swedish Erotica (Caballero) and Electric Blue (Scripglow). Some of this material may have been recycled.

== See also ==
- Golden Age of Porn
