= Dracula Sucks =

- Theatrical release poster
- Directed by: Philip Marshak
- Screenplay by: Darryl A. Marshak; Philip Marshak (as David J. Kern)
- Based on: Dracula by Bram Stoker
- Starring: Jamie Gillis; Annette Haven; John Leslie; Serena; Reggie Nalder; Kay Parker; John Holmes
- Edited by: Nettie Peña
- Music by: Lionel Thomas
- Production companies: Backstreet Productions; First International Pictures; M R Productions
- Release date: 1978
- Running time: 95 minutes
- Country: United States
- Language: English

Dracula Sucks is a 1978 American pornographic horror film directed and co-written by Philip Marshak. The film is based on the 1931 film Dracula, and the 1897 novel of the same name by Bram Stoker. It stars Jamie Gillis as Count Dracula, a vampire who purchases an estate next to a mental institution. The film also stars Annette Haven, John Leslie, Serena, Reggie Nalder, Kay Parker, and John Holmes. An alternate cut of Dracula Sucks, titled Lust at First Bite, has also been released.

== Plot ==
In a psychiatric institution, patients are behaving oddly and are being discovered with bite marks on their necks. Professor Van Helsing believes it to be the work of vampires, and just when things are already bad, they get worse with the arrival of Count Dracula.

== Cast ==
- Jamie Gillis as Dracula
- Annette Haven as Mina
- John Leslie as Dr. Arthur Seward
- Serena as Lucy Webster
- Reggie Nalder as Dr. Van Helsing (as Detlef van Berg)
- Kay Parker as Dr. Sybil Seward
- John Holmes as Dr. John Stoker
- Mike Ranger as Dr. Peter Bradley
- Paul Thomas as Jonathan Harker
- Richard Bulik as Richard Renfield
- Pat Manning as Irene Renfield
- David Lee Bynum as Jarvis
- Seka as Nurse Betty Lawson

== Critical reception ==
Kristen Sollee of Bustle called the film "a gem from the first wave of horror porn."

== Home media ==
In October 2014, Dracula Sucks was released on DVD by Vinegar Syndrome. In August 2018, Vinegar Syndrome released the film on Blu-ray as part of their 5 Films 5 Years Volume #3 set, a release which also contains four other films. In 2022, it was released on 4k UHD and Bluray under the Peekarama label.
