= Carter Stevens =

American pornographic film actor and director (1944-2020)

- Stevens in 2014 at the XRCO Awards
- Born: October 17, 1944; Newark, New Jersey, US
- Died: 30 December 2020 (aged 76); Mount Pocono, Pennsylvania, US
- Other names: Stud Looper, Peter Sutinov, Alan Grodin, Steve Mitchell, Francis X. Bush, Steven Carter, Steven Mitchell, ükî Mitchæll, Francess X. Bush, Malcolm S. Worob, Mal Worob, D. Byrd, Travis St. Germaine, Steven Carter, Steven Mitchell

Carter Stevens (October 17, 1944 – December 30, 2020) was a pornographic film actor, director, grip, gaffer, and film processing lab technician.

Stevens earned a degree in photography from the Rochester Institute of Technology, worked at Eastman Kodak Company and was a shift supervisor at Movielab, the largest independent motion picture processing facility in New York, before going into film-making. He made 8 mm loops, appeared in over 50 adult films between around 1973 and 1993, and directed about 40 films between 1972 and 1996, including a series of films for the Avon Theater chain.

After Stevens's film Punk Rock received favorable reviews and with the increasing popularity of the punk rock music genre, he re-edited and released the film into an R-rated version, replacing explicit sex footage with more music and expanded plot.

He fought battles with drugs, a life-threatening heart attack, and charges of obscenity before re-emerging in the 1990s and early 2000s to produce the BDSM-related S&M News, and several print publications.

== Awards ==
- 2004 Free Speech Coalition Lifetime Achievement Award - Director
- 2009 AVN Hall of Fame inductee
