= Misty Dawn =

American pornographic actress

- Born: May 15, 1963 (age 63)
- Other names: Lori Holmes; Laura Wren; Laurie Holmes; Lori Rose; Laurie Diamond
- Occupation: Adult industry performer
- Height: 5 ft 3 in (1.60 m)
- Spouse: John Holmes (m. 1987; died 1988)
- Children: 1

Misty Dawn (also known as, Lori Holmes, Lori Rose, or Laurie Holmes; born May 15, 1963) is a former adult industry performer. Dawn acted in adult films and videos, and was an exotic dancer. She married fellow adult film actor John “Johnny Wadd” Holmes (aka The Human Tripod) in 1987, and after his death from AIDS-related illness published his autobiography and appeared in several films about his life.

== Early life ==
Dawn was born Laurie Rose on May 15, 1963, in Albuquerque, New Mexico.

== Career ==
=== Appearances ===
Dawn began performing in adult films in 1982, at age 19, and continued until about 1991. After taking a 15-year hiatus, she returned as a fluffer in The World's Biggest Gang Bang III – The Houston 620 (1999). She also appeared in Voyer Vision (2003). Over the course of her career Dawn worked for the Golden Age production companies Beate Uhse, Caballero Home Video, Filmco Releases, Gourmet Video Collection, VCA Pictures, Hollywood Video, and VCX.

As Laurie Holmes, she appeared in multiple documentaries about "Johnny Wadd" Holmes and the adult film industry, including: Wadd: The Life & Times of John C. Holmes (1998), The Other Hollywood (1999), XXXL: The John Holmes Story (2000), and John Holmes: The Man, the Myth, the Legend (2004).

=== Other ventures ===
For a brief time in the mid-1980s, she and Holmes partnered with Bill Amerson in an adult film company known as Penguin Productions. The couple also lived in Amerson's mansion in the hills of Sherman Oaks. Johnny Wadd Holmes was godfather to Amerson's children.

=== Author ===
Dawn, using her legal married name, Laurie Holmes, posthumously released Holmes' memoir, Porn King: The Autobiography of John C. Holmes (1998). In 2012, Bear Manor Media published a revised edition of Porn King, which included added material and photos.

=== Retirement ===
Holmes stopped making adult films in the early 1980s. According to Dawn, "John thought one porn person in the family was enough. And the AIDS thing was just starting to come out. Nobody had gotten it yet, but it was still in the back of our minds. He thought, ‘Well, if I’m going to take a chance, that’s enough.'"

== Personal life ==
Dawn was married to the adult film star John "The Wadd" Holmes from January 23, 1987, until his death on March 13, 1988, during which time he was stepfather to her young son.

According to Dawn, they first met in December 1982 on the set of a film they were working on together in San Francisco, entitled Marathon. (Mike Sager reports the 19-year-old first met Holmes on the set of Fleshpond, though they didn't work together on that film.) They remained close, and in 1987, five years after Holmes was arrested then released from jail in connection with the Wonderland Murders, they married in Las Vegas, at the Little Chapel of the Flowers, after Holmes had confided to her that he had AIDS. The wedding, at which Laurie wore white, was an ordeal for John who was ill, knew he was dying, and realized he and Laurie would not have much of a life together. According to Dawn, "John kept the marriage secret ... because he was a very private person. Thus, when he died, many acquaintances in the industry and journalists reporting on his death were surprised to learn that we were married."
