= Times Square Comes Alive =

- Film poster
- Directed by: Vince Benedetti
- Written by: Marc Roberts; Veronica Vera
- Starring: Veronica Vera; Barbie Dahl; Tasha Voux; Ashley Moore
- Cinematography: Larry Revene
- Edited by: James Macreading
- Music by: Richard Millner
- Distributed by: VCA Pictures
- Release date: 1985
- Running time: 82 minutes
- Country: United States
- Language: English

Times Square Comes Alive is a 1985 pornographic film directed by Vince Benedetti and starring Veronica Vera and Tasha Voux.

== Overview ==
Television reporter Christine Career of 69 Minutes takes an investigative look into the sex industry of Times Square.
