= Candy Stripers (film) =

- Directed by: Bob Chinn
- Written by: Dean Rogers
- Starring: Nancy Hoffman; Sharon Thorpe; Amber Hunt; Eileen Wells (as Eileen Welles); Chris Cassidy (as Montana); Joey Silvera (as Joey Nassivera); Paul Thomas; Phaedra Grant; Richard Pacheco
- Distributed by: Arrow Productions
- Release date: 1978
- Running time: 84 minutes
- Country: United States
- Language: English

Candy Stripers is a 1978 pornographic film by director Bob Chinn and starring Nancy Hoffman and Sharon Thorpe. The film is a comedy about the sexual encounters hospital volunteers have with hospital patients and staff. The title comes from the term candy striper, which is an American term for hospital volunteers, who traditionally wore a red-and-white striped uniform which resembled stick candy.

== Plot ==
It is the last day on the job for hospital volunteer Sharon (Nancy Hoffman). When the volunteers assemble at the start of the day, head volunteer Sarge (Sharon Thorpe) notices that Sharon is absent. Sarge finds Sharon performing oral sex with a doctor and takes her back to work.

As the volunteers go about their duties, they have various sexual encounters with the patients and staff. At the end of the day, staff and patients hold a party for the departing Sharon. Sarge walks in. When Sharon confronts Sarge and calls her a "prude," Sarge reacts by pulling up her dress and forcing Sharon to pleasure her. The party promptly becomes a sex orgy.

== Production ==
Richard Pacheco made his debut in the film. Anxiety over acting in his first film had caused him to break out in hives. During his scene with Nancy Hoffman he had great difficulty maintaining his erection.

== Reception ==
Candy Stripers has been inducted into the X-Rated Critics Organization Hall of Fame. Screw magazine called it "the best sex film of 1978". In July 2008, Terminal Press released a limited-edition comic book version of the film, written by Brian Ferrara.

== Deleted scenes ==
Candy Stripers features two fisting scenes, which are edited from some versions of the film. According to reviewers, the scenes are edited from the main movie in the DVD release, but are included as hidden features to be found separately.

In 2026, an uncut Blu-ray version of the film was released, with the previously censored scenes intact.

== Sequels ==
- Candy Stripers 2 (1985)
- Candy Stripers 3 (1986)
- Candy Stripers 4 (1990)
- Candy Stripers 5: The New Generation (1999)
