= Afrodite Superstar =

2007 film directed by Venus Hottentot

- Video cover
- Directed by: Venus Hottentot
- Produced by: Candida Royalle
- Release date: 2007 (New School for Social Research)

Afrodite Superstar is an American independent art film, shot in New York City in 2006. The film has been referred to as erotica. The director refers to the film as an experimental film as the characters break the fourth wall, and there is a blend of satire. Afrodite Superstar was directed by Venus Hottentot. Executive producer Candida Royalle is credited with directing the sexual scenes.

== Plot ==
The satirical film spoofs several recent pop cultural It Girl moments such as Janet Jackson's wardrobe malfunction and Ashlee Simpson's lip synching fiasco.

== Discussion ==
Afrodite Superstar has been endorsed by American Association of Sexual Educators, Counselors and Therapists and premiered in 2007 at the New School for Social Research with a discussion about women of color and sexual images. The film subsequently screened as part of an art exhibit called Hos, Putas and Dragon Ladies: Our Sexuality Remixed at the chashama Gallery in Manhattan. Afrodite Superstar was nominated for 7 AVN Awards in 2007 including "Best Director", "Best Screenplay" and "Best Musical Score." The film was referred to as "erotic" and "cerebral" in Essence.
