= Aphrodesia's Diary =

- Original movie poster
- Directed by: Gérard Kikoïne
- Written by: Finley Walker
- Produced by: Serge Lincoln; Radley Metzger (uncredited); Audubon Films (New York); Gold Productions (Paris)
- Starring: Dominique Saint Claire; Kevin James; Lisa Cintrice; Joanna Storm; Vanessa del Rio; Morgane; Désirée Cousteau
- Cinematography: Gérard Loubeau
- Edited by: Jason Hyatt
- Music by: Jane Glenn
- Distributed by: Audubon Films; Caballero Control Corporation (CCC)
- Release date: 1983
- Running time: 85 minutes
- Countries: United States; France
- Language: English

Aphrodesia's Diary is an American-French pornographic film shot in 1979 — primarily in New York but also in Paris — and released in 1983. It was directed by French pornographer Gérard Kikoïne and co-produced by Radley Metzger, who may have served as an advisor but is not credited.

The film is related to Metzger's The Tale of Tiffany Lust, also shot in New York in 1979 with the same imported French stars, Dominique Saint Claire and Morgane. The two films also have French cinematographer Gérard Loubeau and, less remarkably, American actors and technicians in common. It is probable that they were made consecutively in Winter-Spring 1979, with the international cast and crew assembled for Kikoïne's big-budget co-production Aphrodesia reused for Metzger's Tiffany, itself quite lavish by pornographic standards.

The film was released during the Golden Age of Porn (inaugurated by the 1969 release of Andy Warhol's Blue Movie) in the United States, at a time of "porno chic", in which adult erotic films were just beginning to be widely released, publicly discussed by celebrities (like Johnny Carson and Bob Hope) and taken seriously by film critics (like Roger Ebert).

== Premise ==
Adrianne is reading her diary in her hotel room, and begins to recall some of the adventures that she wrote in it, including her experiences with a young horse trainer, a man who offered her a lot of money to appear in an erotic film, the gambler who persuaded her to be a liberated woman, and more.

== Cast ==
- Dominique Saint Claire as Adrianne (as Arlene Manhatten)
- Kevin James as Jeff
- Lisa Cintrice as Susie
- Joanna Storm as Mrs. Triad
- Vanessa del Rio as Therapist
- Morgane as Alice (as Marianne Flowers)
- Désirée Cousteau as Cassandra - The Erotic Spirit

== Notes ==
According to one film reviewer, Radley Metzger's films, including those made during the Golden Age of Porn (1969–1984), are noted for their "lavish design, witty screenplays, and a penchant for the unusual camera angle". Another reviewer noted that his films were "highly artistic — and often cerebral ... and often featured gorgeous cinematography". Film and audio works by Metzger have been added to the permanent collection of the Museum of Modern Art (MoMA) in New York City.

== See also ==
- Andy Warhol filmography
- Erotic art
- Erotic films in the United States
- Erotic photography
- List of American films of 1983
- Sex in film
- Unsimulated sex
