= Candida Royalle =

American pornographic filmmaker (1950–2015)

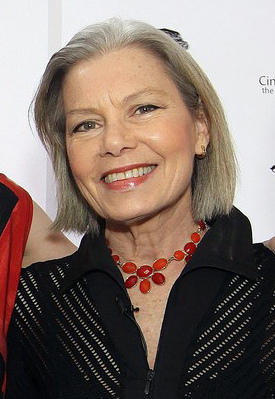
- Royalle at the 2013 CineKink awards
- Born: Candice Marion Vadala; October 15, 1950; Brooklyn, New York City, U.S.
- Died: September 7, 2015 (aged 64); Mattituck, New York, U.S.
- Other names: Candace Chambers; Candice Ball; Candice Chambers; Candida Royalle
- Occupations: Pornographic producer; pornographic director; pornographic actress; sex educator; sex-positive feminist
- Height: 5 ft 3 in (1.60 m)
- Website: candidaroyalle.org

Candida Royalle (born Candice Marion Vadala; October 15, 1950 – September 7, 2015) was an American producer and director of couples-oriented pornography, pornographic actress, sex educator, and sex-positive feminist. She was a member of the XRCO and the AVN Halls of Fame.

== Early life and education ==
Royalle was born Candice Marion Vadala on October 15, 1950 to a working-class Catholic family in Brooklyn, New York. Her father, Louis, worked as a professional jazz drummer and had a hot temper. Her mother, Peggy Frazier, left the family when Royalle was 18 months old and Royalle never saw her again. Candice and her sister Cinthea were raised by their stepmother, Helen Duffy.

Trained in music, dance and art in New York City, she studied at the High School of Art and Design, Parsons School of Design and the City College of New York.

== Career ==
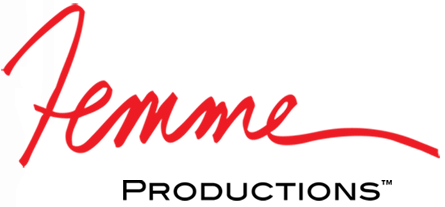
Femme Productions logo

After graduating from the Parsons School of Design, she moved to California and began performing with the avant-garde theater group The Cockettes. In 1975, she played Divine's daughter in the play The Heartbreak of Psoriasis.

In 1975, she began her career as a pornographic performer, appearing in about 25 movies including Hot & Saucy Pizza Girls. Her final film was Blue Magic in 1980, which she also wrote. Royalle quit performing because she got married and was uncomfortable being sexual with other men. Moreover, she had increasingly felt that her strongly feminist views were at odds with the male-centric manner in which traditional pornography was produced and that she had been working in, giving virtually no attention to the female perspective, and making no effort to appeal to female viewers. The increasing availability of cable television and VCR around 1983 provided Royalle both with an incentive and opportunity to consider producing her own "feminist" pornography, aimed at women and couples who wanted to watch a different kind of porn from the privacy of their homes.

Looking back on her involvement with the porn industry in an essay, Royalle notes how "it became clear that people have always been curious about what sex looks like and how to do it, from those created to those who consumed it. ... But one thing was glaringly absent from contemporary pornography: a female vision or point of view. ... Though 1970s culture had changed enough to allow women to pursue active sex lives without the sanction of marriage, porn films still focused on male pleasure, with its laughable depiction of a woman in the throes of ecstasy as her male partner cums on her face, the de rigueur money shot."

Royalle returned to New York in 1980. In early 1984, she founded Femme Productions together with Lauren Neimi. Their goal was making erotica based on female desire, as well as pornographic films aimed at helping couple therapy. Her productions are aimed more at women and couples than at the standard pornographic audience of men, and have been praised by counselors and therapists for depicting healthy and realistic sexual activity.

Royalle stated that she tried to avoid "misogynous predictability", and depiction of sex in "...as grotesque and graphic [a way] as possible." She also criticized the male-centredness of the typical pornographic film, in which scenes end when the male actor ejaculates. Royalle's films are not "goal oriented" towards a final "cum shot"; instead, her films depict sexual activity within the broader context of women's emotional and social lives. In 1989, she signed the Post Porn Modernist Manifesto.

She was featured in Maya Gallus's 1997 documentary film Erotica: A Journey Into Female Sexuality.

In 1997, she was presented with the Free Speech Coalition Lifetime Achievement Award as a director.

Royalle wrote regular columns for adult magazines High Society and Cheri. She was also a public speaker, giving lectures at Smithsonian Institution, the World Congress on Sexology, and numerous universities and professional conferences.

In 2004, she authored the book How to Tell a Naked Man What to Do.

A five-track EP titled Candida Cosmica, a collaboration between Royalle and Patrick Cowley from the mid-1970s, was released in October 2016 by Dark Entries Records.

== Affiliations ==
Royalle was a member of the American Association of Sex Educators, Counselors and Therapists, and a founding board member of Feminists for Free Expression.

== Club 90 ==
In 1983, Royalle, along with Gloria Leonard, Annie Sprinkle and Veronica Vera founded Club 90, the first adult film actress support group.

== Personal life and death ==
In the 1980s, Royalle was married to producer Per Sjöstedt; they separated in 1988. In May 2006, she announced that she was engaged to be married. She died in Mattituck, New York on September 7, 2015, aged 64, from ovarian cancer.

== Legacy ==
In 2019, Candice, a documentary about Royalle's life and finding out what happened to her mother who left her as a child, was screened at various documentary film festivals. It was directed by Sheona McDonald and distributed by Mbur Indie Film Distribution.

Royalle is the subject of the book Candida Royalle and the Sexual Revolution: A History From Below by Jane Kamensky, a former historian at Harvard University. Kamensky describes Royalle's unique place in feminist history. "She is way too critical and self-critical for many of the sex-positive feminists ... and she absolutely does not fit into an anti-pornography box", Kamensky told The New York Times. Kamensky worked to put Royalle's archive, including her photos, letters, film clips, and other memorabilia, into the Schlesinger Library.

== Filmography ==
During her acting career (1975–1980), Royalle performed in 25 traditional male-centred porn films, including Ball Game (1980) by Ann Perry, Hot & Saucy Pizza Girls, Hot Racquettes, Delicious, Fascination by Chuck Vincent, and finally Blue Magic (1980), which Royalle also wrote and her then-new husband Per Sjöstedt produced.

By 2013, Royalle had (jointly) written or directed 18 feminist porn films with Femme Productions since 1984, including:

Candida Royalle's Femme Productions videos open like a perfume commercial, with a young woman running across a country field in a lacy white nightgown. "Finally, there's Femme," breathes the female announcer as the woman is caught and passionately kissed by a bare-chested man. "Erotic film star Candida Royalle dares to bring to the screen the fantasies that women have been dreaming about all these years." The scene cuts to two men caressing one woman, and to a couple biting a slippery piece of watermelon together. The announcer speaks tenderly. "Femme... it's only the beginning."

— Laura Jane Fraser, 1990
- Femme (1984)
- Urban Heat (1984)
- Three Daughters (1986)
- Christine's Secret (1986)
- A Taste of Ambrosia (1987)
- Rites of Passion (1987)
- Sensual Escape (1988)
- Revelations (1993)
- My Surrender (1996)
- The Gift (1997)
- The Bridal Shower (1997)
- Erotica: A Journey Into Female Sexuality (1997)
- One Size Fits All (1998)
- Eyes of Desire (1998)
- Eyes of Desire 2 (1999)
- Afrodite Superstar (2006)
- Under the Covers (2007)
