= Zodiac Rapist =

1971 American film

- DVD released by After Hours Cinema
- Produced by: John Lamb
- Starring: John Holmes
- Release date: September 1971 (United States)
- Running time: 63 minutes
- Country: United States
- Language: English

Zodiac Rapist (also known as Zodiac Killer) is a 1971 pornographic film starring John Holmes. The film is loosely based on the crimes of California serial killer the Zodiac.

== Plot ==
A woman who is pleasuring herself while tending to her garden is attacked by a man the media have dubbed "the Zodiac Rapist". In his office, Detective Sam Dobbs complains that the newspapers are making him look incompetent due to his inability to catch the Zodiac, who has been taunting him with letters and telephone calls. Dobbs has sex with a secretary, while the Zodiac is shown searching for another victim.

An applicant for a job walks in on Dobbs and his secretary, and while the latter runs off in embarrassment, the nude Dobbs interviews the woman, who he intends to use as bait to catch the Zodiac. Dobbs tests how good a lure the woman is by having sex with her, oblivious to the fact that he is being spied on by the Zodiac. Dobbs moves on to another one of his secretaries, while the Zodiac follows the lure to her home, and after mocking Dobbs over the phone, breaks into the house, and rapes the woman, and her roommate.

Realizing the significance of the Zodiac's call, Dobbs rushes to the bait's house, but the Zodiac escapes. Annoyed that Dobbs stopped the "famous" Zodiac from ravaging them, the women start a threesome with him to satiate themselves. Afterward, Dobbs returns to his office, and picks up where he left off with the secretary he was with before he left to pursue the Zodiac, who is watching a masturbating woman. The Zodiac calls Dobbs with another clue, then rapes the masturbating woman in her pool, and on her deck.

Dobbs, who is driving around while receiving fellatio, realizes where the Zodiac is, and rushes there. In order to escape, the Zodiac distracts Dobbs by attempting to drown his victim (who is annoyed by the detective's intrusion) by throwing her into the pool. Back at the office, Dobbs meets with a female officer, who the chief of police has sent to make sure he is doing his job, and not just seducing secretaries. Dobbs and the officer end up having sex, and afterward there is a knock on the door. As Dobbs hides, the Zodiac enters, and tries to sexually assault the officer, but she beats him to the floor, and rapes him as Dobbs looks on in awe.

The Zodiac is arrested, and a voice-over announces, "And thus was the end of the reign of the Zodiac. For his despicable crimes, the felon was ordered to death by hanging. But the sentence was dropped when it was revealed to the jury that the Zodiac was 'quite hung enough' already..."

== Cast ==
- Andy Bellamy as Policewoman
- Buddy Boone as Detective Sam Dobbs
- Sandy Dempsey as Secretary with Apple
- John Dullaghan as Voiceovers
- John Holmes as The Zodiac Rapist
- Annette Michael as Brunette in Garden
- Tricia Opal as Blonde Secretary
- Eve Orlon as Brunette in Bedroom
- Nora Wieternik as Secretary with Garter Belt
- Linda Wroom as Blonde in Pool

== Release ==
The film was released on DVD by After Hours Cinema in 2008 in a double feature with Sam Dobbs and the Guru Gangbang.

== Reception ==
Ian Jane of DVD Talk gave the film a positive review, calling it "a lot of goofy fun" and "an easy recommendation to fans of seventies smut". Tom Becker of DVD Verdict said that while the film was clever, it was ultimately not very interesting, though Becker did state, "If old-school smut is your thing, or if you're a John Holmes completest, this set will make a nice addition to your possibly secret stash".

== See also ==
- List of American films of 1971
