= Amerson =

Amerson is a surname. Notable people with the surname include:

- Archie Amerson (born 1974), American and Canadian football player
- Bill Amerson (1938–2015), American adult film producer and actor
- David Amerson (born 1991), American football player
- Glen Amerson (1938–2020), American football player
