= Juliet Anderson =

American pornographic film actress and director (1938–2010)

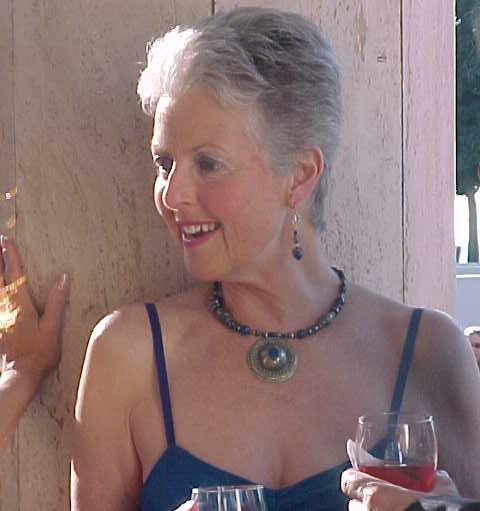
- Anderson in 2001
- Born: Judith Carr; 1938 or 1939; Los Angeles, California, U.S.
- Died: January 10, 2010 (aged 71); Berkeley, California, U.S.
- Other name: Aunt Peg
- Occupations: Pornographic film actress; adult movie producer

Judith Carr (1938 or 1939 – January 10, 2010) known professionally as Juliet Anderson, was an American pornographic film actress and adult movie producer, relationship counselor and author. Entering the adult movie business relatively late in life (at age 39), she quickly built a reputation as one of the premier performers in the so-called "Golden Age of Porn", appearing in over seventy films—often as "Aunt Peg", a role portrayed as a giddy, insatiable woman determined to enjoy life and sex to the maximum extent possible. In 1987, she started a new career as a relationship counselor and massage therapist, before returning to adult entertainment in the mid-1990s.

== Early life ==
Anderson was born in Los Angeles, the daughter of a jazz trumpet player and an aspiring nurse. She was afflicted with both childhood arthritis and Crohn's disease and spent a sizable portion of her youth in the hospital or on bedrest. Graduating from Burbank High School in 1956 (where she was a straight-A student), she briefly attended Long Beach State College as an art major before relocating to Hayama, Japan, in 1961, with her then lover, a United States Navy sailor. A brief marriage to him did not work out, ending in 1964, after which she spent the next thirteen years in various occupations, including clerical worker, teaching assistant in kindergarten and high school, and English as a second language teacher, and working as a radio journalist in Finland.

In 1963, while living in Miami, she was a secretary to a producer of "nudie" movies and a receptionist at the Burger King home office; she also worked for Avis during this period. In her website autobiography, she indicated she appeared in an (unnamed) sexploitation film in 1963, portraying a police sergeant.

During this time, she was known by her birth name of Judith Carr. She did not begin using the moniker "Juliet Anderson" until later in her adult film career, when she made the transition from 8mm productions to feature films.

== Adult film career ==
After living in Finland from 1971 to 1977, working as a radio journalist and teaching English to Finnish schoolchildren, she returned to the United States in 1977, and became involved in the pornography business in 1978 while trying to get into documentary film making. She was working in advertising when she answered an ad by hardcore pornography producer Alex de Renzy, who was looking for an actress. Her career took off after she was cast in the movie Pretty Peaches. She acquired the name of "Aunt Peg" during a clip in the Swedish Erotica series, where she was portrayed as having sex with a niece, who cried out: "Oh, Aunt Peg!"; thus arose the moniker by which Anderson is best known to her fans.

Anderson appeared in several pornographic magazine pictorials, operated a mail-order business, a casting agency, was a phone operator for a phone-sex service, made appearances on both radio and television. She also created and performed in stage shows across the United States, combining comedy, sex, and Q&A sessions in her performances. Anderson later indicated those stage exhibitions were the "most gratifying" portion of her adult career.

Although Anderson portrayed many characters during her movie career, all tended to be tough-talking and unsentimental, yet rambunctious, vibrant and even comedic—all at the same time. She was said never to have faked an orgasm in any of her films. Author Charles Taylor wrote she "brought a persona of classic movie-broad to porn", referring to her as "the Joan Blondell of porn." Another critic, Howard Hampton, opined that "her tough, no-nonsense older woman routine would be at home in the margins of any Howard Hawks movie."

== Leaving and returning ==
In 1985, Anderson chose to leave the adult film business after signing over, under pressure, distribution rights for the film Educating Nina. Anderson had directed, produced and appeared in the film, and funded it with money she raised from various investors. The film was notable for featuring the debut of future porn superstar Nina Hartley. Anderson received no income for the film, and all the investors' money was lost. She moved to Placerville, California, where she worked in a bed and breakfast, cleaned houses and did child care and elder care. During this time, she continued to do some live stage shows and opened a massage therapy office. Anderson returned to pornography in 1995, making new movies as an actress, producer and director.

In 1998, she directed and produced Ageless Desire, a hardcore video featuring several over-50 real-life couples, including Juliet and her partner at the time. Numerous awards followed: Induction into the Erotic Legends Hall of Fame in 1996, an X-rated Critics Organization Hall of Fame Award in 1999, and a "Lifetime Achievement Actress Award" from the Free Speech Coalition in 2001. In 2007, Anderson received an honorary Doctor of the Arts from The Institute for Advanced Study of Human Sexuality. She was featured in the 1998 documentary Wadd: The Life & Times of John C. Holmes and also made one of her last appearances in Dick Ho: Asian Male Porn Star in 2005.

By 2009, Anderson was living in Berkeley, California with four cats, and serving as the manager of her apartment complex. Although no longer working in the adult film industry, she had announced plans to produce new films. She also worked as a relationship counselor, giving private workshops for couples focusing on "Tender Loving Touch", in which sexual touching is seen as "the play, not foreplay." She contributed to the books The New Sexual Healers: Women of the Light and The Red Thread of Passion, and authored articles for magazines and newspapers.

== Death ==
Anderson died at home on January 10, 2010. A friend who arrived at Anderson's residence to take her to a doctor's appointment discovered her body the following day. He further reported he found Anderson in her bed, with nothing in the room appearing to be "out of the ordinary." He stated Anderson had expressed a desire to be cremated. A memorial was held on January 26, 2010, at the Center for Sex and Culture in San Francisco where friends she had known in and out of the business, including Nina Hartley whom she mentored, attended and gave testimonials to her kind and warm friendship. Later that month, it was revealed Anderson had died of a heart attack.

== Awards ==
- AVN Awards Hall of Fame
- XRCO Hall of Fame (inducted 1999)
