= Hot & Saucy Pizza Girls =

1978 American pornographic film

- Theatrical release poster
- Directed by: Bob Chinn
- Written by: John T. Chapman
- Produced by: Toni Damiani
- Starring: Desireé Cousteau; John C. Holmes; Candida Royalle
- Edited by: Joe Sherman
- Production companies: Damon Christian Productions; Tenaha Timpson Releasing
- Release date: 1978
- Running time: 76 minutes
- Country: United States
- Language: English

Hot & Saucy Pizza Girls is a 1978 American pornographic comedy film directed by Bob Chinn and starring Desireé Cousteau, John C. Holmes, and Candida Royalle.

== Cast ==
- John C. Holmes as John
- Bob Chinn as Bob (as Danny Hussong)
- John Seeman as Inspector Blackie
- Desireé Cousteau as Ann Chovy
- Candida Royalle as Gino
- Laurien Dominique as Shakey
- Christine de Shaffer as Celeste

== Home media ==
In 2014, the film was restored and released on DVD by Vinegar Syndrome.

== Reception ==
A retrospective review wrote that the film is "a breezy blast of fun from 1979".
