= Laura Jane Fraser =

American journalist, essayist, memoirist and travel writer

Laura Fraser
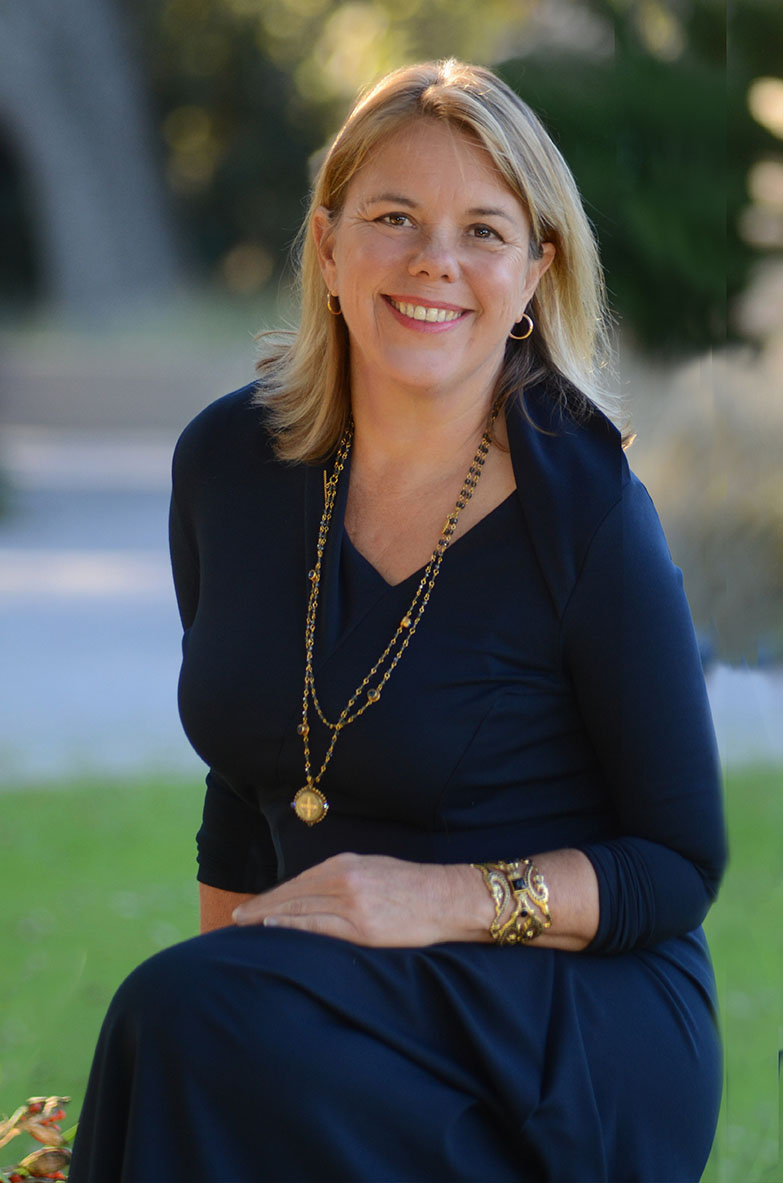
- Born: 1961 (age 64–65); Denver, CO, United States
- Occupations: Journalist; essayist; memoirist
- Writing career
- Genre: literary nonfiction journalism

Laura Fraser (born 1961) is an American journalist, essayist, memoirist and travel writer. Her most recent book is The Risotto Guru, published by Shebooks in 2013. All Over the Map, published by Harmony in June 2010 is described as a "coming–of-middle-age" story about her adventures exploring the globe. It is a sequel to her first memoir, the New York Times-bestselling An Italian Affair (Pantheon, 2001). All Over the Map was included in Oprah's Top Ten to Read Now for Summer, ranked #2 Bestseller in Denver, and awarded Traveler Book of the Month by National Geographic magazine. Fraser is co-founder and Editorial Director of Shebooks.net, an ebook publishing platform for women. She is based in San Francisco.

== Early life and education ==
Fraser was born in Denver, Colorado and grew up in Littleton, Colorado. Throughout her childhood she wrote for her school publications, and during her senior year of high school, she wrote a column for the Littleton Independent.

Fraser graduated from Wesleyan University in 1982 where she majored in American Studies and was co-editor of the Wesleyan Argus.

== Journalism ==
Fraser published her first piece in the Jerusalem Post while volunteering on an Israeli kibbutz. In the late eighties, Fraser was a columnist for both the San Francisco Bay Guardian and the San Francisco Weekly. During this time, she exposed a ring of fake abortion clinics, run by a right-wing fundamentalist group, who gave false medical information to women seeking counselling. The San Francisco District Attorney subsequently shut the clinics down.

Fraser wrote investigative reports about the California prison system’s efforts to discontinue prison-wide newspapers by transferring the inmates who served as editors.

In 1991, ten days before Gulf War, Fraser traveled to Baghdad where she interviewed Yasser Arafat. The story ran in the San Francisco Examiner's Image Magazine.

Fraser has served as a contributing editor for Good Housekeeping, Health and More magazines. Her articles have appeared in The New York Times, The Los Angeles Times, The San Francisco Examiner, O: The Oprah Magazine, Gourmet, Vogue, Salon.com, Mother Jones, Sunset, Self, Martha Stewart Living, Tricycle Buddhist Review, Glamour, Mirabella, Wired, Town & Country Travel, and Budget Travel.

Fraser's work has been anthologized in The Best Women's Travel Writing. Her essay, "Dance of the Spider Women" appeared in Vol. 8 (2012) and "The Rice Man Cometh" appeared in Vol. 9 (2013).

== Books ==
Fraser's first book, Losing It: False Hopes and Fat Profits in the Diet Industry (Random House, 1997) tracks the chronology and culture of dieting in society as well as her own struggles with dieting and an eating disorder. Following the book's release, Fraser made appearances on the Today Show, Good Morning America, NBC Nightly News, MTV, CNN, and MSNBC.

An Italian Affair (Pantheon, 2001) is her first memoir, which Fraser begins by describing the devastating marriage breakup that became the catalyst for her journey to Italy, and the life-affirming relationship she discovered while trying to heal her broken heart.

All Over the Map (Harmony, 2010) is a continuation of her previous memoir and discusses self-discovery in her middle age after a romantic relationship disintegrates. The travelogue documents her experiences through the South Pacific, Europe, South America, and Africa.

The Risotto Guru (Shebooks, 2013) is a collection of essays where Fraser uses her personal experience to describe the culture and cuisine of Italy.

== Teaching ==
Fraser's philosophy on writing is heavily influenced by her mentor, William Zinsser (who is married to her father's cousin, Caroline Fraser Zinsser), whose book On Writing Well promotes spare writing with a natural voice and telling details. Fraser has taught classes at Media Alliance and University of California, Berkeley Extension since the early 1990s. She has lectured at the UC Berkeley and San Francisco State Graduate Schools of Journalism as well as at Harvard University's Nieman Conference on Narrative Journalism. Fraser has taught creative non-fiction classes at Aspen Summer Words, the San Miguel de Allende Writing Workshop, The Kansas City Writers' and Readers' Conference, and A Room of Her Own Foundation.

Fraser also works as a writing coach and is a resident at the Writer's Grotto in San Francisco, of which she has been a long time member.

== Publishing ==
Fraser is co-founder and Editorial Director of Shebooks.net, an ebook publishing platform for women. Shebooks publishes short fiction, memoir and long form journalism, and emerged when its three co-founders noticed publishing options for women shrinking, specifically when it came to long form journalism

== Awards and recognition ==
- “Outstanding Young Journalist,”1989. (Northern California Society of Professional Journalists)
- “Best Food Writing,” 2000 (Marlowe & Company)
- “Best Food Writing,” 2002 (Marlowe & Company)
- “Best Women’s Travel Writing,” 2005 (Traveler's Tales)
- "Best Women's Travel Writing," 2012 (Traveler's Tales)
- "Best Women's Travel Writing," 2013 (Traveler's Tales)
- “Best Buddhist Writing,” 2010 (Shambala Press)
- “Excellence in Women’s Health Research Journalism Award,” 2005 (Society for Women's Health Research.)
- “Bert Greene Award for Food Writing,” 2008. (International Association of Culinary Professionals.)
- Wesleyan University Service Award, 2007
- An Italian Affair (Pantheon, 2001) was a New York Times bestseller. It was a Book Sense Pick and selected as one of Laura Bush's 100 picks for the White House Library. It has been translated into five other languages.
- All Over the Map (Harmony, 2010) was one of O the Oprah Magazine's top ten summer reads, and National Geographic Traveler's book of the month.

== Personal life ==
Fraser joined the Daughters of the American Revolution in 2012 but later resigned from the organization.
