= Pearson Candy Company, Inc. =

American confectionery company

Pearson Candy Company, Inc. of Culver City, California was an American confectionery company founded in 1928 by Barney Pearson. The company manufactured over 30 candy products during its 42 years in business. Most notable was the Pearson Nips Candy which continues to be produced and sold today by Nestlé.

== History ==
Formed in 1928, the Pearson Candy Company, Inc. was originally located in downtown Los Angeles on Fifth Street and Towne Avenue. In 1955, the business relocated to 10101 West Jefferson Boulevard and Pearson Street on seven acres adjacent to the Metro-Goldwyn-Mayer motion picture back lot.

== Three-generation family business ==
- Barney Pearson, an immigrant from Russia, began making candy by hand. Suckers were twirled and the wooden stick forced by hand and pushed into the center of the sucker. Barney Pearson worked through the Great Depression until his death in 1940 at the age of 54.
- Ed Pearson, son of Barney Pearson, joined during the Great Depression in the late 1930s to assist his father in keeping the business profitable. Challenged by the economic times, Ed Pearson, in an effort to obtain sugar which was at that time rationed, had to sell finished product to continue production of their candy products. After the economic recovery, Ed Pearson would travel to Europe to observe and study candy production methods. He served as President of the company following Barney Pearson's death.
- Daniel Pearson, son of Barney Pearson, joined in 1945 as the House Accountant and General Manager.
- Barry Pearson, son of Ed Pearson, joined in 1964 moving the company forward into modern candy manufacturing methods. Barry Pearson worked in production, stopwatch timings, equipment acquisitions and installations. In 1970, Barry formed Candy Sales Company Incorporated and continued to sell Pearson candy products to wholesalers and retailers in Southern California for several years.

Candy Products
Pearson Coffee Nips candy
Pearson Caramel Nips candy
Pearson Licorice Nips candy
Pearson Chocolate Parfait Nips candy
Pearson Mint Parfait Nips candy
Pearson Dulce de Leche Nips candy
All-Day Suckers
It's A Winner Suckers
Whirl Suckers
Berry Pops
Coffeoca candy
Peanut Butter Crunch candy
Wrapped hard candy
Grape suckers
Candy Canes
Ball & Wafer candy
Jumbo Pop's
Foil Wrapped candy
Pick-A-Mix in bulk candy
Caramel candy
Filled Candies

== Products ==
Over 30 types of confectioneries were manufactured including lollipops, suckers, candy canes, and hand-wrapped candies. The Pearson Nip line was created in the early 1960s with the introduction of the Coffee Nip followed by the Caramel Nip, the Licorice Nip and other flavors. The company designed a candy forming apparatus which was patented in 1961.

=== Signature product: Pearson Coffee Nip ===
The Pearson Coffee Nip was developed by observing European techniques. The formula for the Coffee Nip was created by Claude Barnett, a food chemist, and Dan Pearson. Pearson requested a candy that people would eat during a work break, such as on a coffee break. Without a laboratory or test kitchen, research was done on a coffee candy formula using batch size samples. Barnett used a high cooked caramel mixed with coffee until the right combination was achieved.

The unique wrappings observed in European wrapped candy inspired the use of gold foil and fancy cellophanes using double or single twist wraps. The original colors of the Coffee Nip wrappers were coffee brown, chartreuse and backed by a foil inner wrap producing the third color.

== Ownership changes ==
1. In 1968, Pearson Candy Company, Inc. was sold to W.R. Grace Company.

2. In 1982, W.R. Grace Company and Pearson Candy Company, Inc. holdings were sold to RJR Nabisco.

3. In 1989, RJR Nabisco's candy holdings including Pearson Candy Company, Inc. were sold to Nestlé.
