= First Entertainment Credit Union =

Credit union in California

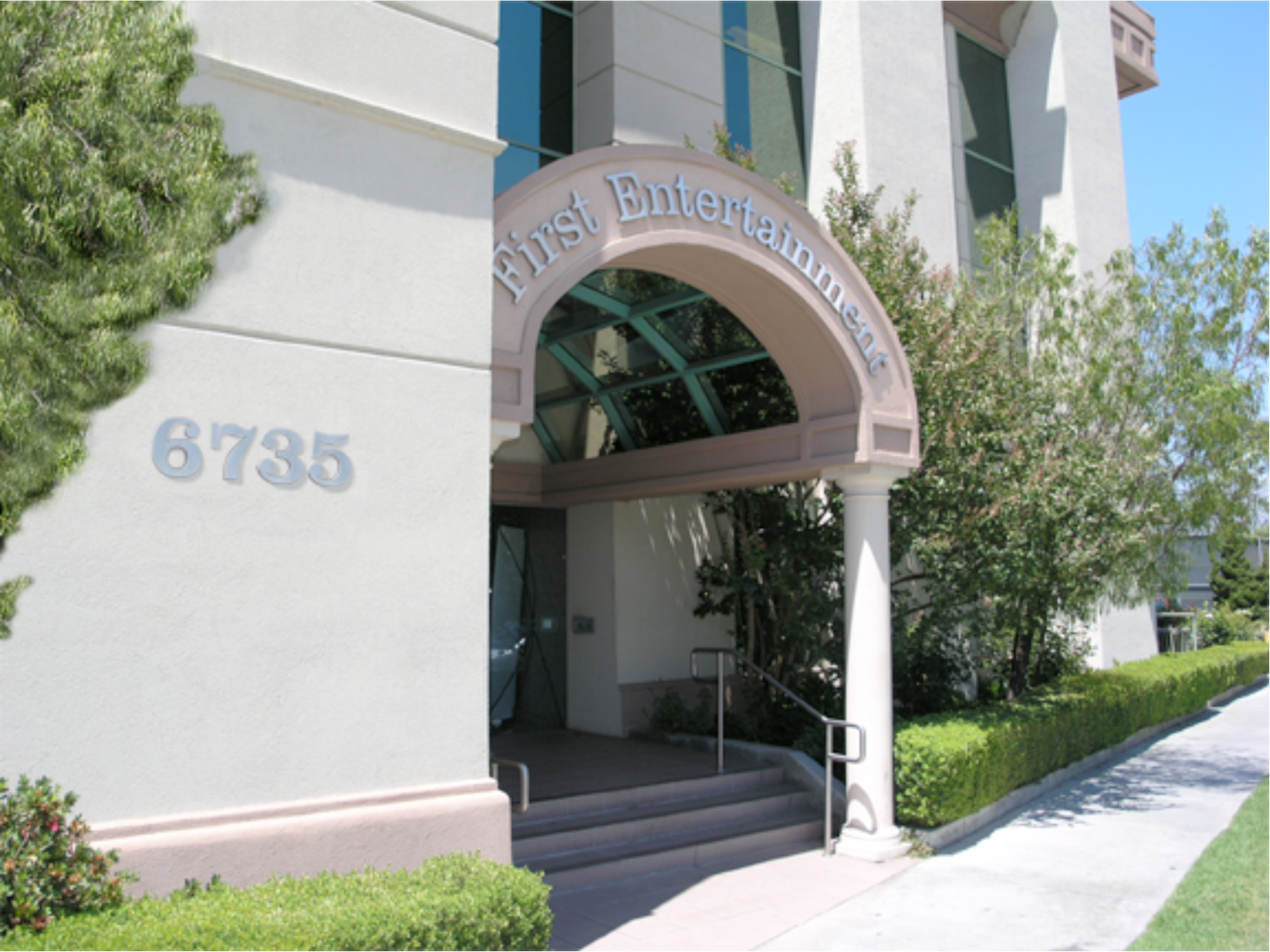
- First Entertainment’s Headquarters in Hollywood, CA.
- Type: Credit Union – Charter 68373
- Industry: Financial Services
- Founded: 1967
- Headquarters: Hollywood, California, United States
- Number of locations: 8
- Area served: Greater Los Angeles County, Entertainment Industry personnel and their families
- Key people: Stephen Owen, President/CEO
- Products: Savings; Checking; Consumer Loans; Mortgages; Online Banking
- Total assets: $2.0 billion (2023)

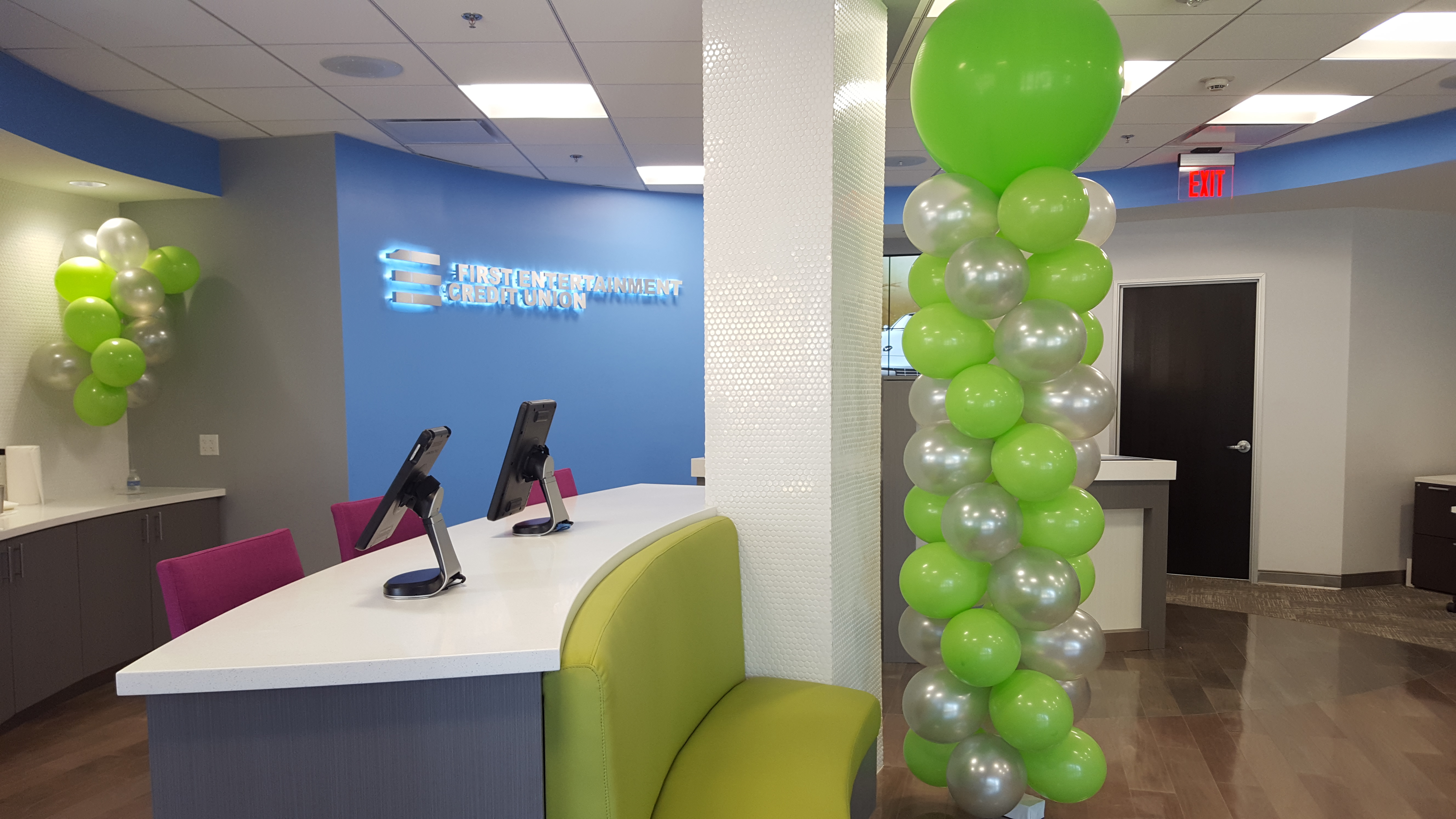
A First Entertainment branch lobby in Culver City, CA

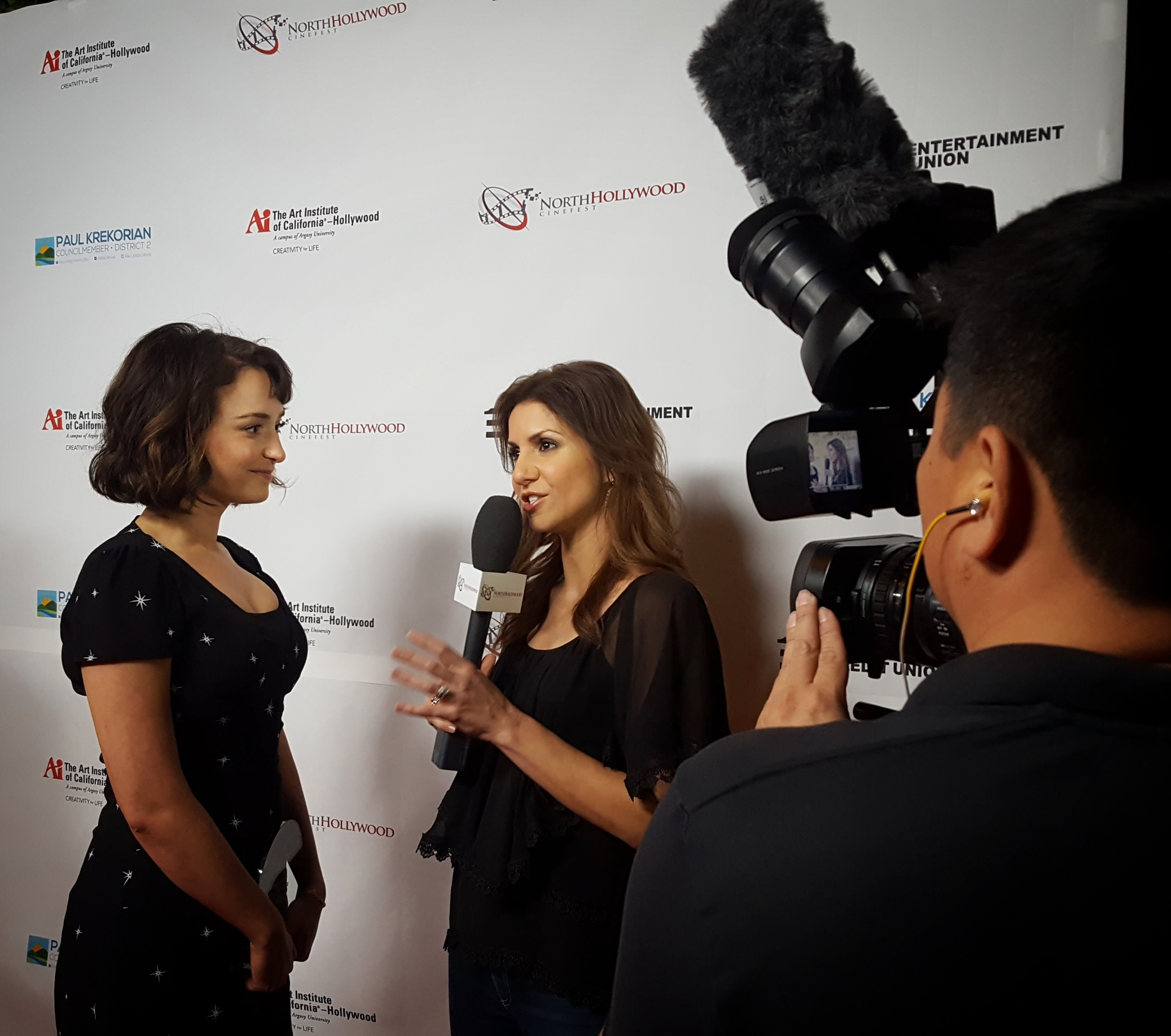
First Entertainment has sponsored community events in the Los Angeles area.

First Entertainment Credit Union (or First Entertainment) is a state-chartered, natural person (retail) credit union – a cooperative financial institution that is owned and controlled by its members and operated for the purpose of providing credit at competitive rates and other financial services to its members. Headquartered in Hollywood, California, First Entertainment Credit Union is regulated under the authority of both the California Department of Financial Protection and Innovation (DFPI) and the National Credit Union Administration (NCUA), an agency of the U.S. federal government.

== History ==
First Entertainment Credit Union was founded by Kenneth Mancebo and other employees of Warner Bros. Studios in 1967 – opened in a small office on Warner Bros. lot with only $40 in assets. First known as the Warner Seven Federal Credit Union, the name was changed to Warner Bros. Employees Federal Credit Union in 1970, and following a merger with the Columbia (Studios) Employees Credit Union in 1973, became the Columbia/Warner Bros. Employees Federal Credit Union.

As the credit union grew, so did the number of those eligible for the services offered. Now able to take on more entertainment-based companies, the organization realized that a new name was needed so it would better define their expanded field of membership. In 1984, the credit union was renamed First Entertainment Federal Credit Union. Following another merger, this time with Screenland/MGM Employees Credit Union, First Entertainment’s assets nearly doubled in size – from $40 million to $73 million.

The vigorous growth continued through the 1990s as the institution merged with A & M Records Employees Federal Credit Union, Six Flags Employees Federal Credit Union, Las Vegas Credit Union, and Paramount Studios Employees Credit Union. In an effort to better serve the entertainment industry as a whole, as well as serving the steadily increasing membership, the credit union switched from a federal to a state charter. The institution, now known as First Entertainment Credit Union, saw its assets surpass $2.0 billion in 2022.

As of 2023, the credit union serves nearly 90,000 members and many companies in the entertainment industry and operates 8 branches in the Los Angeles area. Three of those branch locations are on studio lots at Warner Bros., Sony, and Paramount. The other branches are located in Hollywood, Burbank, Studio City, Culver City, and Santa Clarita.

== Organization ==
First Entertainment is insured by the NCUA and is governed by a board of volunteers that is elected by and from its membership. The credit union also manages a wholly owned separate subsidiary, Media Benefits Corporation (MBC), which operates as a Credit Union Service Organization (CUSO). CUSOs were established by NCUA as a way for credit unions to pursue product offerings that would normally be outside of the purview of a credit union.

Media Benefits Insurance Services (MBIS), a wholly owned insurance service of First Entertainment, operates under the credit union's CUSO MBC and offers its members auto, vehicle, renter's, homeowner's and pet coverage.

== Services ==
A full-service financial institution, First Entertainment Credit Union offers a wide range of products and services such as: Savings and Checking Accounts, IRAs, Money Markets, Personal and Vehicle Loans, Platinum Visa® Credit Cards, Auto Loans, Real Estate Loans, and a First Time Homebuyer Program. First Entertainment Credit Union offers its members online account access and electronic services such as e-Statements, e-Alerts, Bill Pay Services, Online Tutorials, Mobile Banking and Mobile Deposits. Members can also submit Loan Applications online and prospective members can apply for membership online.

First Entertainment is also one of a handful of financial institutions that offer Coogan Accounts. Designed to protect the earnings of child performers, the details of the Coogan Act (SB 1162) stipulate that every time young performers work under an entertainment contract, 15% of their gross earnings are to be saved, directly deposited and, though the funds are the legal property of the minor, are to be left untouched until they reach legal majority age.

As part of the CO-OP network, the credit union provides members with access to their funds at 5,000 Shared Branching locations and 30,000 surcharge-free ATMs in the U.S. and Canada.

== Membership ==
Membership in First Entertainment Credit Union is open to current and retired employees and their families of the companies served by First Entertainment. Companies can apply for membership by submitting a Select Employee Group questionnaire on the First Entertainment Credit Union web site. In addition, most individuals who work, live, attend school, or worship in Los Angeles County are also eligible to join.

Credit Union Family Membership permits relatives of members to join, even if they are not employed in the entertainment industry. According to credit union bylaws, a family member "includes any relative by blood or marriage, or foster and adopted children, or domestic partners, of a primary credit union member. Domestic partners are defined as those partners who reside together for six months and state that they are financially interdependent." Any individual who joins the credit union as a family member is entitled to the same membership benefits available to the sponsoring member.

First Entertainment supports the entertainment community by sponsoring local Union and Guild events, film festivals including the Burbank International Film Festival, affinity partnerships with their companies served and regularly featuring members and companies on their website and social media channels.
