= Bobby Hollander =

Pornographic film director and performer (1929–2002)

- Born: Ira Allen Sachs; April 20, 1929; Brooklyn, New York, U.S.
- Died: March 7, 2002 (aged 72); Los Angeles, California, U.S.
- Other names: Bob Hollander, B. Hollanger
- Occupation: Film director
- Height: 6 ft 0 in (1.83 m)
- Spouse: Gloria Leonard (separated)

Bobby Hollander (April 20, 1929 – March 7, 2002) was an American adult film director, performer, and magazine publisher. He directed 59 pornographic films between 1979 and 1995. He was one of the pioneers of the shot-on-video porn movie. Hollander was most infamous for discovering and managing porn superstar Shauna Grant. He is a member of the XRCO Hall of Fame.

== Pornographic film career ==
Born Ira Allen Sachs to a Jewish family in Brooklyn, Hollander entered the pornography industry in 1970, appearing in loops.

According to a March 14, 1988 article in People, Hollander gave Colleen Applegate her stage name Shauna Grant, and in the fall of 1982 began managing her career. Over the next year, Grant made 30 X-rated movies. She eventually left Hollander for different management and committed suicide in 1984.

== Robbed by John Holmes ==
In King Dong, Hollander describes being introduced to fellow pornographic actor John Holmes, at the home Hollander shared in Burbank, and leaving briefly the next day to find John had robbed Hollander's house:

So we got high that day, and we were showing everyone around the house. We went out to the pool, and I was bragging about getting new cars the next day. We had an 11 o'clock appointment to pick up the cars the next day. So we go and get the cars -- they're beautiful, I love it -- we get home, we walk in the front door, and the house is a shambles. The television is gone, the VCR is gone, cameras are gone, jewelry is gone, the bedroom is completely ransacked, guns were gone. And the only one who knew that we were going to be gone at that particular time, that day, was John Holmes.

== Illness and death ==
He died on March 7, 2002, at the Veterans Affairs hospital in Los Angeles, California from a brain tumor. At the time of his death, Hollander was separated from his wife Gloria Leonard.
