= Seka (actress) =

American pornographic film actress (born 1954)

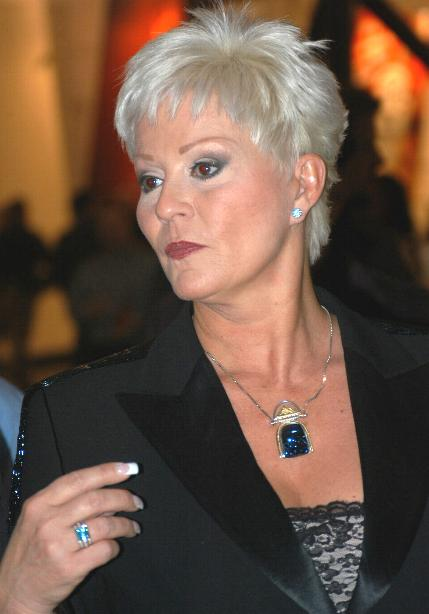
- Seka at the 2007 AVN Awards
- Born: Dorothiea Ivonniea Hundley; 1954 (age 71–72); Radford, Virginia, U.S.
- Other name: Dorothea Hundley Patton
- Occupation: Pornographic film actress
- Height: 5 ft 8 in (1.73 m)
- Spouse(s): Francis "Frank" Patton (m. 1972; div. by 1977)
- Website: seka.com

Dorothiea Ivonniea Hundley (born 1954), known professionally as Seka, is an American pornographic film actress who was known in the 1980s as the "Platinum Princess of Porn". In 2013, she released an autobiography about her life and career titled Inside Seka.

== Early life ==
Seka was born April 15, 1954, in Radford, Virginia. She recalled having "a plain, normal childhood" with two siblings, a brother and sister. Her family later moved to Hopewell, Virginia, where, nicknamed "Dottie", she won a beauty pageant at Hopewell High School. She was later crowned Miss Southside Virginia.

She married Francis "Frank" Patton on April 21, 1972, a week after her 18th birthday. She worked for Reynolds Metals Company, maker of Reynolds Wrap household aluminum foil. She later became a clerk at an adult bookstore, where she began dating the owner.

== Career ==
=== Beginnings: 1970s–1990s ===
After briefly operating a chain of seven adult bookstores in Virginia, Seka sold her interest in the business and moved to Las Vegas, where she did her first erotic modeling for a magazine. She later moved to Los Angeles, where she appeared in her first pornographic film. She told an interviewer in 2006:

I liked porn, but I didn’t like how women were treated. Women had no makeup and their feet were dirty and they had pimples on their butt and their hair was nasty and the producers didn’t care what the women looked like as long as there was a cum shot.

Seka used the stage name "Linda Grasser" early in her career. She eventually adopted the name "Seka" after a female blackjack dealer she knew in Las Vegas. By the mid-1980s, she was writing and directing adult films, as well as starring in them.

She stopped performing in pornography in 1992 because of what she saw as the adult film industry's poor response to the AIDS epidemic, including an unwillingness to require condom use or routine HIV screening. She would go on to model for Club magazine and release videos through the website AEBN, as well as performing striptease on tour.

=== Later appearances ===
For several years beginning in 1994, Seka hosted a talk show called Let's Talk About Sex on Chicago FM radio station WLUP.

In 1997, she was presented with the Free Speech Coalition Lifetime Achievement Award.

In 2005, she moved from Chicago to Kansas City, operating her fan club through her own website. In February 2007 she announced her first hardcore scene in nearly 15 years, distributed via online pay-per-view.

Seka has appeared on various television talk shows including The Oprah Winfrey Show, The Phil Donahue Show, and The Morton Downey Jr. Show. She appeared on Saturday Night Live in the 1980s and was interviewed for the documentary After Porn Ends (2012).

=== Reception and legacy ===
PopMatters describes Seka as "one of the adult industry's most recognizable superstars". She was known as the adult film world's "Platinum Princess" whom the magazine High Society called the "Marilyn Monroe of porn". Pornographic film actor Jamie Gillis, who performed with her numerous times, said "Seka was porn, but a little above it—sort of a white trash queen in a way". Director Brian DePalma stated Seka had genuine acting talent.

In the DVD commentary for the film Boogie Nights (1997), director Paul Thomas Anderson stated that she was the main inspiration for his character of Amber Waves due to her involvement in a documentary about pornographic film actor John Holmes.

== Personal life ==
Seka was married to Frank Patton from 1972 to no later than 1977. She dated comedian Sam Kinison in the mid-1980s, crediting him for arranging her appearance on Saturday Night Live.

== Awards ==
Seka is a member of the AVN Hall of Fame, XRCO Hall of Fame, and Urban X Hall of Fame. She is also in the Porn Block of Fame.

== Partial filmography ==
- Teenage Desires (1978)
- Dracula Sucks (1978)
- Heavenly Desire (1979)
- Rockin' with Seka (1980)
- The Seduction of Cindy (1980)
- Prisoner of Paradise (1980)
- Inside Seka (1980)
- Exhausted: John C. Holmes, the Real Story (1981)
- Blond Heat (1985) (opposite John Leslie)
- Careful, He May Be Watching (1987)
- American Garter (1993)
- Desperately Seeking Seka (2002)

== Bibliography ==
- Seka; Zukus, Kerry (2013). Inside Seka. BearManor Media. ISBN 978-1-59393-272-5.
- Seka & Maria – Issue No. 01 (1979) from Holly Publications. Classic-Erotica
