= John Holmes (actor) =

American pornographic actor (1944–1988)

- Holmes in the 1980 film Prisoner of Paradise
- Born: John Curtis Estes; August 8, 1944; Ashville, Ohio, U.S.
- Died: March 14, 1988 (aged 43); Los Angeles, California, U.S.
- Other names: John Duval; John Estes; Big John Fallus; Big John Holmes; John C. Holmes; John Curtis Holmes; Johnny Holmes; Bigg John; Big John; John Rey; Johnny Wadd; John Sacre; Long John Wadd; Johnny B. Wadd; Johnny the Wad; John C. Wadd; John E. Wadd; The Duke of Wadd; John Foot Long; Wadzilla; King Wadd; The Human Tripod; Wizard of Wadd; The Sultan of Smut; The Reverse Birth; The Sheriff of Grottingham; Eve's Burden
- Occupation: Pornographic film actor
- Years active: 1967–1987
- Spouses: Sharon Ann Gebenini (m. 1965; div. 1984) Laurie Rose (m. 1987)

John Curtis Holmes (né Estes; August 8, 1944 – March 14, 1988), better known as John C. Holmes or Johnny Wadd (after the lead character he portrayed in a series of related films), was an American pornographic film actor. Holmes ranks among the most famous and prolific adult film performers, with documented credits for at least 573 films. Holmes was known for the exceptional size of his penis, which featured heavily in his marketing.

Near the end of his life, Holmes had been charged for his reputed involvement in the Wonderland murders of July 1981. He died from complications caused by AIDS in March 1988. Holmes was the subject of several books, a lengthy essay in Rolling Stone, two feature-length documentaries and was the inspiration for two Hollywood movies: Boogie Nights (1997) and Wonderland (2003).

== Early life ==
John Holmes was born John Curtis Estes on August 8, 1944, in Ashville, Ohio, a small town located about 11 miles (18 km) south of Columbus. He was the youngest of four children born to 26-year-old Mary June (née Barton) Holmes, but the name of his father, railroad worker Carl Estes, was left blank on his birth certificate. Mary had married Edgar Harvey Holmes, who was the father of her three older children – Dale, Edward and Anne. She and Edgar were married and divorced three times, as is documented by wedding certificates dated April 13, 1936; August 13, 1945; and September 12, 1947. At the time of their first marriage in 1936, Edgar was 35 years old and divorced, while Mary was aged 17. After divorcing for the third and final time, Edgar and Mary each got married once more.

Holmes' mother was said to be a devout Southern Baptist and with her children regularly attended church in Millport, Ohio. By contrast, his stepfather Edgar was an alcoholic who would come home inebriated, stumble about the house and even vomit on the children. As a child, Holmes enjoyed a reprieve from his turbulent home life when he visited his maternal grandparents, John W. and Bessie (née Gillenwater) Barton.

On December 31, 1951, when Holmes was aged 7, his mother married Harold Bowman. Shortly afterward, Holmes and his family moved to the small town of Pataskala, Ohio, about seventeen miles east of Columbus. Holmes recalled that Bowman was a good father until his younger half-brother David was born, at which point Bowman reportedly lost interest in his stepchildren and began neglecting them.

In 1960, Holmes left home at age 15 and enlisted in the United States Army, with his mother's written permission. He spent most of the three years of his military service in West Germany in the Signal Corps. Upon his honorable discharge in 1963, Holmes moved to Los Angeles, California, where he worked in a variety of jobs, including selling goods door-to-door and tending the vats at a Coffee Nips factory. During his stint as an ambulance driver, Holmes met a nurse named Sharon Gebenini in December 1964. They married on August 21, 1965, in Fort Ord, California, after Holmes turned 21.

In April 1965, Holmes found work as a forklift operator at a meatpacking warehouse in Cudahy. However, repeated exposure to the freezing air in the large walk-in freezer after being outside inhaling the desert-hot air caused him severe health problems, leading to a collapsed lung on three occasions during the two years he worked there. Sharon also had health problems, as during the first seventeen months of her marriage to Holmes she miscarried three times.

== Career ==
=== Film career ===
John Holmes was to the adult film industry what Elvis Presley was to rock 'n' roll. He simply was The King.

— Cinematographer Bob Vosse in the documentary Wadd: The Life & Times of John C. Holmes.

Holmes began his pornographic film career in the late 1960s while he was unemployed and recovering from his collapsed lung. He frequented a men's card playing club in Gardena where on one evening, he allegedly met a photographer while standing next to him at a restroom urinal; the photographer gave Holmes his business card, telling him that he could find work in the underground adult film business. From 1969, Holmes did nude modeling for underground adult magazines as well as occasional stag films.

In 1971, Holmes' career began with an adult film series built around the eponymous private investigator Johnny Wadd, written and directed by Bob Chinn. The success of the first Johnny Wadd film created an immediate demand for follow-ups, so Chinn followed up the same year with Flesh of the Lotus. Most of the subsequent Johnny Wadd films were written and directed by Chinn and produced by the Los Angeles-based company Freeway Films.

With the success of Deep Throat (1972), Behind the Green Door (1972) and The Devil in Miss Jones (1973), porn became chic even though its legality in the United States was still hotly contested. Holmes was arrested during this time for pimping and pandering, but he avoided prison time by reputedly becoming an informant for the Los Angeles Police Department (LAPD). Holmes' "handler" during his time as an informant was LAPD vice detective Thomas Blake. Of his involvement with Holmes, Blake said, "It was a pleasure working for him."

By the late 1970s, Holmes was reputed to be earning as much as $3,000 per day as a porn performer. Around this time, his consumption and freebasing of cocaine was becoming an increasingly serious problem, affecting his ability to maintain an erection. To support himself and his drug habit, Holmes ventured into crime, selling drugs for gangs, prostituting himself to both men and women, as well as committing credit card fraud and various acts of petty theft. In 1976, Holmes met 15-year-old Dawn Schiller, who later claimed he groomed her, abused her, and forced her into prostitution to support his drug habit.

=== Number and sex of partners ===
In the 1981 biographical feature documentary Exhausted: John C. Holmes, The Real Story, from director and Holmes confidante Julia St. Vincent, Holmes stated during an interview segment that he had sex with over 14,000 women. The number had in fact been invented by the actor on the spur of the moment to help salvage his waning image. The true number of women and men with whom Holmes had had intercourse with during his career would never be known. After his death, his ex-wife Sharon came across a footlocker, plated in 24k gold leaf, which contained photographic references to Holmes' "private work" and which she burned. Holmes' performances included at least one homosexual feature film, The Private Pleasures of John C. Holmes, which was filmed in 1983.

=== Drugs and the Wonderland murders ===
In late 1980, a mutual friend introduced Holmes to Chris Coxx, who owned the Odyssey nightclub. In turn, Coxx introduced Holmes to Eddie Nash, a drug dealer who owned several nightclubs, including the Starwood in West Hollywood. At the same time, Holmes was closely associated with the Wonderland Gang, a group of heroin-addicted cocaine dealers, so called for the rowhouse located on Wonderland Avenue in the Laurel Canyon neighborhood of Los Angeles, out of which they operated. Holmes frequently sold drugs for the gang. Gang members included Ronnie Lee Launius, David Clay Lind and their "wheelman," Tracy McCourt.

After using more than his share of the Wonderland Gang's drugs, Holmes found himself falling out of their favor. In June 1981, he told Launius and Lind about a large stash of drugs, money and jewelry Nash was keeping in his house. Holmes helped to set up a home invasion and armed robbery committed on the morning of June 29. Holmes was not present during the robbery.

In the early hours of July 1, four of the gang's members were found murdered and a fifth severely beaten in the Wonderland Avenue rowhouse. Holmes was allegedly present during the murders and left a palm print (not "bloody" as Los Angeles media outlets covering the story erroneously reported) over one victim's headboard, but it is unclear whether he participated in the killings. Holmes was questioned but was released due to lack of evidence; he refused to cooperate with the investigation. After spending nearly five months on the run with Schiller, Holmes was arrested in Florida on December 4 by former LAPD homicide detectives Frank Tomlinson and Tom Lange (the latter of whom later gained fame for his role in the O. J. Simpson murder case). Holmes was extradited to Los Angeles, and in March 1982 was charged with personally committing all four murders. After a three-week trial, Holmes was acquitted on June 26, 1982, on all charges except committing contempt of court. The murder trial was a landmark in the history of American trial procedure, as it was the first in which videotape was introduced as evidence.

== Penis size ==
Veteran porn actress Dorothiea "Seka" Patton has said that Holmes' penis was the biggest in the industry. In the documentary film Exhausted, she described oral sex with Holmes as similar to fellating a telephone pole. Holmes' first wife recalled his claiming to be 10 inches (25.4 cm) when he first measured himself in her presence. On another occasion, Holmes claimed his penis was 16 inches (40.6 cm) long and 13 inches (33.0 cm) in circumference. Holmes' long-time friend and industry associate, Bill Amerson, said, "I saw John measure himself several times; it was thirteen-and-a-half inches [34.3 cm]. The head was the size of an apple." In contrast, medical studies of human penis size have consistently found erections average between about five and six inches, with fewer than 0.2% of penises 9.5 inches (24 cm) or more.

"We're talking about a dick from my elbow down" (gesturing to his outstretched arm)

— Adult industry historian Bill Margold in the documentary Wadd: The Life & Times of John C. Holmes.

So celebrated was the size of John Holmes' penis that it was used as a promotional tool for films in which he did not even appear. The film Anyone But My Husband ran a promotional tag line of: "Tony 'The Hook' Perez has a dick so big he gives John Holmes a run for his money." At the height of his career, Holmes had his manhood insured by Lloyd's of London for US$14 million. Holmes reveled in claiming he was insured "for $1 million an inch".

"To think that he walked among us with that massive tool, like a dinosaur with that thump, thump, thump! But it wasn't his feet hitting the floor. It was his balls hitting the floor, it was his DICK hitting the floor!"

— Adult industry publisher and commentator Al Goldstein in the documentary Wadd: The Life & Times of John C. Holmes.

Another controversy was regarding whether Holmes ever achieved a full erection, although much of his early work clearly revealed he was able to achieve a substantial erection. A popular joke in the 1970s porn industry held that Holmes was incapable of achieving a full erection because the blood flow from his head into his penis would cause him to pass out. Fellow film actress Annette Haven stated that his penis was never particularly hard during intercourse, likening it to "doing it with a big, soft kind-of loofah".

"'How big is it?' My fans would scream. 'Bigger than a payphone, smaller than a Cadillac' was my reply."

— Actor John C. Holmes in his posthumously-released autobiography, Porn King.

After Holmes' death, the length of his penis continued to be used to market Holmes-related material. For example, at the premiere of the film Wonderland (2003), patrons were given 13 1/2-inch rulers as gag gifts. When Los Angeles-based S&M Bikes debuted its first extra-long bicycle frame for BMX racing in 1989, the new model was dubbed the "Holmes" as a tribute to the actor.

== Personal life ==
On August 22, 1965, Holmes married a young nurse named Sharon Ann Gebenini at Fort Ord, California. Their divorce was finalized on October 19, 1984. She died on October 28, 2012.

In 1975, Holmes met Julia St. Vincent on the set of his film Liquid Lips, which was being produced by her uncle Armand Atamian. Holmes and St. Vincent remained close until the Wonderland murders in 1981. St. Vincent produced the ersatz biographical film of Holmes' life Exhausted (1981).

In 1976, Holmes started a relationship with a 15 year old girl, Dawn Schiller. Holmes allegedly got Dawn addicted to drugs, physically and sexually abused her and trafficked her out to support his own drug addiction. In her memoir, The Road Through Wonderland: Surviving John Holmes (2009), Schiller also made the assertion that she and her sister Terry believed Holmes was a voyeur who looked through their bungalow windows in Glendale, as well as strangers' hotel windows at the Biltmore in Palm Springs.

In 1982, Holmes met his second wife Laurie Rose; they married in January 1987, which made Holmes stepfather to Rose's young son.

== Later life and death ==
=== Relationships ===
After his release from Los Angeles County Jail for contempt of court in November 1982, Holmes quickly resumed his film career with a new generation of porn stars. His drug addiction continued off-and-on, and although work was still plentiful, it was no longer as lucrative as it had been with the advent of cheaply made videotapes that saturated the porn market. Most of the adult films and videos he made during the 1980s were little more than cameo appearances.

In February 1986, five or six months after initially testing negative, Holmes was diagnosed as HIV-positive. According to his second wife, Holmes claimed that he never used hypodermic needles and that he was deathly afraid of them. Both his first wife and friend Bill Amerson separately confirmed later that Holmes could not have contracted HIV from intravenous drug use as he never used needles.

During the summer of 1986, Holmes was offered a lucrative deal from Paradise Visuals, who were unaware he was HIV-positive, to travel to Italy to film what were to be his last two pornographic films. Holmes' penultimate film was The Rise of the Roman Empress (originally released in Italy as Carne bollente) for director Riccardo Schicchi. The film starred Holmes, the later Italian Parliament member Ilona "Cicciolina" Staller, Tracey Adams, Christoph Clark and Amber Lynn. His final film was The Devil In Mr. Holmes, starring Adams, Lynn, Karin Schubert and Marina Hedman. These last films created a furor when it was revealed later that Holmes had deliberately concealed his HIV status from his co-stars before engaging in unprotected sex for the production. Not wanting to reveal the true nature of his failing health, Holmes claimed to the press that he was suffering from colon cancer.

Holmes married Laurie Rose on January 23, 1987, in Las Vegas, Nevada, after confiding to her that he had AIDS. During the last five months of his life, from November 1987 to March 1988, Holmes received treatment and stayed at the VA hospital on Plummer Street in Sepulveda. On March 13, 1988, at age 43, Holmes died from AIDS-related complications, which, per his death certificate, were described as cardiorespiratory arrest and encephalitis due to AIDS, associated with lymphadenopathy and esophageal candidiasis. Holmes' body was cremated, and his widow Laurie and mother Mary scattered his ashes at sea off the coast of Oxnard, California.

=== Hobbies ===
During his free time, Holmes enjoyed clay sculpting, woodworking and outdoor activities such as visiting beaches, camping, fishing and hiking.

== Business activities and endeavors ==
In 1979, along with his younger half-brother David Bowman, Holmes opened a Los Angeles locksmith shop managed by Bowman and an attached used goods store called The Just Looking Emporium, named by Gebinini and managed by Schiller. However, because of Holmes' escalating drug addiction, he was distracted from buying inventory for the Emporium and siphoned its working capital, the Emporium "close[d] its doors forever by the end of September 1980". According to Schiller, "David [kept] his part of the business open while John remove[d] our inventory and [sold] it all for coke."

Later, after Holmes' acquittal, he and Amerson founded and operated Penguin Productions, where Holmes could be a triple-threat: writing, directing and performing. Holmes appeared in seven of Penguin's twenty productions between 1985 and 1988. After requesting permission to use the name "Johnny Wadd" from his old director and friend Bob Chinn, Holmes reprised the role for Penguin's The Return of Johnny Wadd (1986) – one of his last films.

== Holmes mythology ==
Holmes' career was promoted with a series of claims that he made over the years (many made up on the spur of the moment by Holmes himself). The most dubious ones include:

- Holmes had degrees in physical therapy, medicine, and political science from UCLA. Holmes was in fact a high school dropout who never returned to school and, according to Bill Amerson, "the closest John ever got to UCLA was breaking into cars in the school's parking lot".
- Holmes' manhood was so big that he had to stop wearing underwear because: "I was getting erections and snapping the elastic waist band four or five times a month".
- During the filming of a gay feature film, Holmes inadvertently killed two male performers and was tried for manslaughter. The judge in the case sentenced Holmes to abstain from performing anal sex in any future films. However, this is likely an urban myth.
- Holmes and Ken Osmond, who played Eddie Haskell in the TV series Leave It to Beaver and later became a Los Angeles police officer, were the same person. In reality, the two men simply shared a resemblance. This urban legend was prevalent enough that, according to Osmond, it was necessary at one point for him to disrobe in front of his police supervisor to prove that he was not Holmes.

== Filmography ==
Productions in the Johnny Wadd series:

- Johnny Wadd (1971)
- Flesh of the Lotus (1971, credited as John Duval)
- The Blonde in Black Lace (1972, credited as John Duval)
- Tropic of Passion (1973)
- The Danish Connection (1974)
- Around the World with Johnny Wadd (1975)
- Here Comes Johnny Wadd (1975)
- Liquid Lips (1976)
- Tell Them Johnny Wadd is Here (1976)
- Tapestry of Passion (1976)
- The Jade Pussycat (1977)
- Hot & Saucy Pizza Girls (1978)
- The China Cat (1978)
- Blonde Fire (1978)
- The Return of Johnny Wadd (1986)

Other significant performances:

- Zodiac Rapist (1971)
- Confessions of a Teenage Peanut Butter Freak (1975)
- Cream Rinse (1976)
- Fantasm Comes Again (1977)
- Dracula Sucks (1978)
- Summertime Blue (1978)
- California Gigolo (1979)
- Insatiable (1980)
- Prisoner of Paradise (1980)
- Deep Thoughts (1980)
- Up n Coming (1983)
- The Private Pleasures of John C. Holmes (1983)
- Young & Hung (1985)
- The Good, the Bad, and the Horny (1985)
- Looking for Mr. Goodsex (1985)
- Puss O Rama (1986)
- Saturday Night Beaver (1986)

== Awards ==
- February 14, 1985 – first inductee into the X-Rated Critic's Organization (XRCO) Hall of Fame
- 2008 XBIZ Award – Lifetime Achievement – Male Performer

== Biographies ==
=== Print ===
- Holmes, John C. (1998). Porn King: Autobiography of John C. Holmes. (out of print)
  - Holmes, John C.; Holmes, Laurie (2012). Porn King: Autobiography of John C. Holmes (Revised with added material and photos ed.). Bear Manor Media. ISBN 978-1-59393-685-3.
- Sager, Mike (June 15, 1989). "The Devil and John Holmes". Rolling Stone. Archived from the original on September 17, 2015.; reprinted in Scary Monsters and Super Freaks (2004).
- Sugar, Jennifer; Nelson, Jill C. (2008). John Holmes, A Life Measured in Inches. BearManor Media. ISBN 978-1-59393-302-9.; updated 2nd edition (2011; ISBN 978-1-59393-674-7)

=== Documentaries ===
- Exhausted: John C. Holmes, the Real Story (1981)
- Wadd: The Life and Times of John C. Holmes (1999)
- XXXL: The John Holmes Story (2000; also known as The Real Dirk Diggler: The John Holmes Story)
- John Holmes: The Man, the Myth, the Legend (2004)

== See also ==
- Golden Age of Porn
