= Dave Cummings =

American pornographic actor (1940–2019)

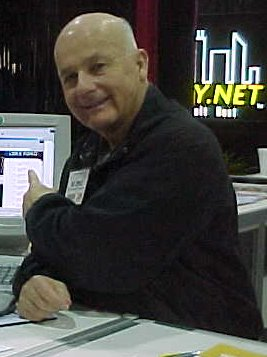
- Cummings at the 2000 AVN Adult Entertainment Expo
- Born: David Charles Conners; March 13, 1940; Saratoga Springs, New York, U.S.
- Died: October 5, 2019 (aged 79); Oceanside, California, U.S.
- Occupation(s): Adult film actor, adult film director, adult film producer
- Children: 2

Dave Cummings (born David Charles Conners, March 13, 1940 – October 5, 2019) was a pornographic actor who billed himself as the "oldest living male pornstar".

== Life and education ==
Born in Saratoga Springs, New York, Cummings' background is unusual for a porn actor: he received both a Bachelor of Science degree in economics and a master's degree in public administration; in addition, he spent over 25 years as an officer in the United States Army, retiring with the rank of lieutenant colonel. He was married for 22 years and had two children and four grandchildren.

He was almost 55 years old before he launched his acting career with The Devil in Miss Jones 5: The Inferno and was regarded as a major adult porn star appearing in hundreds of adult films and a reputation for sexual stamina. Cummings claimed he only used viagra when doing back-to-back sex scenes or working with very demanding directors. He was inducted into the AVN Hall of Fame in 2007 and the XRCO Hall of Fame in 2011.

== Death ==
Cummings died in his sleep on October 5, 2019, at age 79; he had been battling Alzheimer's disease in his latter years. Due to his record of armed service, Dave was laid to rest at Miramar National Cemetery in San Diego, California.
