= Prisoner of Paradise (1980 film) =

- Theatrical release poster
- Directed by: Gail Palmer; Bob Chinn
- Written by: Gail Palmer; Jeff Fairbanks
- Starring: John C. Holmes; Seka; Elmo Lavino; Sue Carol; Jade Wong; Nikki Anderson
- Release date: 1980
- Running time: 75 minutes
- Country: United States
- Language: English

Prisoner of Paradise (also known as Nazi Love Island) is a 1980 American pornographic exploitation film directed by Gail Palmer and Bob Chinn. The film takes place during World War II, and stars John C. Holmes as Joe Murrey, a shipwrecked sailor who comes to the rescue of two American nurses who are being held captive by a Nazi officer and his three assistants on an island in the South Pacific. The other members of the cast include Seka, Elmo Lavino, Sue Carol, Jade Wong, and Nikki Anderson. The film was released in the United States in 1980, and received an X rating from the Motion Picture Association of America.

The film has been classified as an example of "Nazisploitation", a subgenre of exploitation and sexploitation films in which Nazi characters are prominent.

== Plot ==
Carol and Gloria, two nurses in the American forces, are held prisoners in a concentration camp set on a Pacific island by the sadistic Nazi Hans von Shlemel and his lady assistants. Joe Murrey, a G.I. attempts to rescue them but is also taken and forced to provide sexual services.

== Cast ==
- John C. Holmes as Joe Murrey
- Seka as Ilsa
- Elmo Lavino as Hans (as Heinz Mueller)
- Sue Carol as Greta
- Jade Wong as Suke
- Nikki Anderson as Carol (as Nicki Anderson)
- Brenda Vargo as Gloria
- Mai Lin as Sue Lee (as Miko Moto)

== Critical reception ==
A reviewer in Cinema Retro wrote: "What sets Prisoner of Paradise apart from most of the porn drivel of this era is the better-than-average direction coupled with a relatively lavish budget. There are some impressive special effects in the finale and the directors even manage to squeeze in an original love song". Brian Orndorf of Blu-ray.com called the film "an uncomfortable mix of tonal speeds", and criticized it for "trying to pass itself off as reflective cinema when it should be focusing exclusively on salacious encounters."

== Home media ==
The film was released on DVD and Blu-ray by Vinegar Syndrome.
