= Gloria Leonard =

American pornographic actress, feminist (1940–2014)

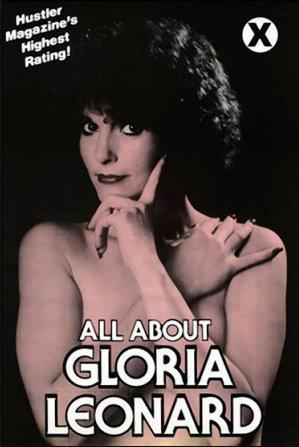
- Leonard on the poster of All About Gloria Leonard
- Born: Gale Sandra Klinetsky; August 28, 1940; The Bronx, New York, U.S.
- Died: February 3, 2014 (aged 73); Waimea, Hawaiʻi County, Hawaii, U.S.
- Occupations: Pornographic film actress; publisher
- Spouse(s): Charles Leonardi Jr. (divorced); Bobby Hollander (separated)
- Children: 1

Gale Sandra Klinetsky (August 28, 1940 – February 3, 2014), known professionally as Gloria Leonard, was an American pornographic film actress and publisher of High Society magazine. As a board member of Adult Video Association and its successor the Free Speech Coalition, Leonard was an outspoken advocate for the adult film industry and free speech rights.

== Career ==
According to pornographic film historian Ashley West, publisher of The Rialto Report, Leonard worked for a Wall Street brokerage firm in the 1960s before moving on to work in public relations, including a stint writing copy for Elektra Records in New York's West Village. Upon her return to New York, looking for work, she contacted casting agent Dorothy Palmer, who apparently failed to tell Leonard that the acting role she cast her in was for an adult film.

=== Adult film ===
Leonard began appearing in hardcore pornography in 1974 and appeared in approximately 40 film/projects from 1976 to 1984, in films including Odyssey: The Ultimate Trip (1977), directed by Gerard Damiano, The Trouble With Young Stuff, All About Gloria Leonard (both of which were written and directed by Joseph W. Sarno), Fortune Smiles, Maraschino Cherry and Taboo: American Style. She is best known for her role in The Opening of Misty Beethoven, Radley Metzger’s erotic reimagining of George Bernard Shaw’s play Pygmalion. She retired from acting in 1984.

=== Publishing ===
In 1977, she was hired as the publisher of High Society magazine, a position she held for 14 years while continuing to act and appear in films. She was hired by the magazine's publisher Carl Ruderman, who wanted a female publisher of a men's magazine. Adult-industry historian Ashley West stated in an interview that Ruderman expected her to be a figurehead, but that she took the position seriously. West said, "Gloria really would visit wholesalers herself, had relationships with all the distributors, would hire and fire staff, would supervise layouts, would recommend and decide upon the content, so really became a hands-on editor, at least in the first five or six years of her stint at High Society."

Leonard is also credited with two successful ideas that each became cottage industries, the publishing of nude celebrity photos and phone sex lines. Starting out as a feature that showcased risqué photos of celebrities like Jodie Foster and Goldie Hawn, usually lifted from film stills, the former became a spin-off venture of High Society called Celebrity Skin magazine in 1986. Over its 25-year run Margot Kidder, Ann-Margret and Barbra Streisand unsuccessfully attempted to sue the magazine after it published nude photos of them.

=== Phone sex line pioneer ===
Leonard is credited with being one of the first people to use "976 numbers" for promotional purposes and as a revenue stream: this later became known as the "phone sex" industry. Initially Leonard recorded her own voice informing callers of the contents of the next issue of High Society magazine before its publication. Later she recorded others, such as Annie Sprinkle, "talking sexy". Leonard convinced magazine owner Ruderman to purchase more of these numbers and the business began to be successful using the magazine to promote the service.

=== Appearances ===
Early in her career she was interviewed by a magazine for an article titled "The Parkway All-Stars" (after the Mosholu Parkway in the Bronx) about a group of overachievers who grew up within a 15-block radius. The article also featured interviews with actor Robert Klein, actress Penny Marshall and her brother, television producer Garry Marshall, and fashion designers Calvin Klein and Ralph Lauren. Fellow actress Veronica Vera recalled Leonard saying, "Yeah, I knew Ralph Lauren when he was Ralph Lipschitz [sic]."

Leonard was also presenter at an awards ceremony for Video Review magazine that was emceed by Klein. She recalled in an interview, "When he introduced me he told the audience, 'For 15 years I walked to school with this woman and I saw more of her in three minutes of Misty Beethoven than I saw in all of those 15 years.'"

Leonard appeared in a documentary film by Melissa Monet called Porn—It's A Living. Leonard delivered the film's opening line: "Not too many people are going to be proud saying, 'Look at my daughter, look how good she sucks cock.'"

=== Television appearances ===
She had a role as a salesperson on Simon & Simon in 1984, in the episode "Manna from Heaven". Leonard had also been a guest on several talk shows, including Oprah, Geraldo, Maury, Larry King, Morton Downey Jr., and Howard Stern. She has also hosted her own television shows - The Leonard Report: For Adults Only and later, Gloria Leonard's Hot Shopper Hour.

== Advocacy ==
=== Organizations ===
Leonard helped found and was a lifetime member of one of the industry's earliest adult actress support groups. Started in 1984, the group was named Club 90 and initially met at Annie Sprinkle's home at "90 Lexington Avenue" in New York. Other members included Veronica Vera, Veronica Hart, Annie Sprinkle, and Candida Royalle.

She also served as administrative director of the Adult Film and Video Association of America, the adult film industry trade association, from 1989 to 1992, until that organization merged with the Free Speech Coalition. In 1998, she was elected president of the FSC. She was also president of the AFVAA in 1986.

=== Feminism ===
Leonard was a feminist and free speech advocate, and debated on the issues of pornography and censorship and their impact on the women's movement at several colleges and universities. For several years in the 1980s she debated representatives from the feminist organization Women Against Pornography at numerous college campuses.

== Awards and recognition ==
She won the Best Actress award for Taboo, American Style from the AFAA. Leonard is a member of the X-Rated Critics Organization (XRCO) Hall of Fame and Adult Video News (AVN) Hall of Fame. In 2002, she was also inducted into the Porn Block of Fame.

== Personal life ==
Leonard was Jewish and raised in the Bronx neighborhood of New York City. She was a single mother, more mature than most porn ingenues, and had had other occupations, such as a Wall Street broker and publicist. She was formerly married to adult film producer and director Bobby Hollander. Her first two marriages ended in divorce. She was separated from Hollander, her third husband, when he died in 2002.

=== Relationship with Norman Mailer ===
In a chance meeting in an Upper East Side New York restaurant in 1982, Leonard first met author and playwright Norman Mailer. Mailer, a noted womanizer, struck up a conversation with Leonard after recognizing her. The meeting was rumored to have led to an affair between the two, but it did not last long.

Later on, Leonard was approached by a group of movie distributors from the Midwest to finance what was described as "the world's first million-dollar pornographic movie." She invited Mailer to lunch and made her pitch. In an interview Leonard said that the author "sat straight up in his chair and said, 'I always knew I'd one day make a porny.'" Leonard then asked what his fee would be and Mailer responded with "Two-hundred fifty thousand". The project later ended due to scheduling conflicts between the two.

== Death ==
Leonard had made her home in Waimea, Hawaii, in what proved to be her last years. Either on January 31, 2014, or in the early hours of February 1, she suffered a massive stroke there. Not found for approximately 24 hours afterward, she was transported to a nearby hospital. As a result of the stroke, Leonard was left with extensive brain damage, and she died on February 3, 2014, at the age of 73, after having her life-support systems disconnected.
