= Bob Chinn (film director) =

Chinese-American pornographic director

- Born: May 10, 1943 (age 83); Hawaii, United States
- Other names: Daniel Hu Song, Daniel Husong, Danny Hussong, Harry Who, Sparky Shayne, Robert Husong, Robert Chinn, Robert C. Chinn, R. Hussong, Wizard Glick, Bob Chin, Bob A. Lain
- Occupations: Pornographic film director, actor
- Spouse: Deborah Chinn

Bob Chinn (born May 10, 1943) is a Chinese-American pornographic film director and actor. He is a member the AVN Hall of Fame and the XRCO Hall of Fame.

Born in Hawaii to immigrants from China who later settled in California, Chinn started his career circa 1970 after graduating from UCLA film school in 1966. He directed Candy Stripers, which is listed in the XRCO Hall of Fame.

He also created and directed the Johnny Wadd series of films featuring actor John C. Holmes. He made a total of 9 films with John Holmes in this series. Later, he was extensively interviewed in the documentary Wadd: The Life & Times of John C. Holmes. In the 2000s, Chinn directed a new Johnny Wadd series which featured Joel Lawrence as Wadd.

== Selected filmography ==
=== Johnny Wadd main series ===
- Johnny Wadd (1971)
- Flesh of the Lotus (1971)
- Blonde in Black Lace (1973) a.k.a. "Johnny Wadd & His 13 Caliber Weapon" in DVD release
- Tropic of Passion (1973)
- Liquid Lips (1976)
- Tell Them Johnny Wadd Is Here (1976)
- The Jade Pussycat (1977)
- The China Cat (1978)
- Blonde Fire (1978)

=== other Johnny Wadd films ===
- The Danish Connection (1974), softcore film directed by Walt Davis
- Around the World with Johnny Wadd (1975), compilation of John Holmes scenes
- Tapestry of Passion (1976), directed by Alan Colberg
- The Return of Johnny Wadd (1986), directed by Patty Rhodes
- Re-enter Johnny Wadd (2001)
- Satin and Sabotage (2001), a.k.a. Johnny Wadd and the Sword of Charlemagne 1
- Silk and Seduction (2002), a.k.a. Johnny Wadd and the Sword of Charlemagne 2
- Passion and Betrayal (2002), a.k.a. Johnny Wadd and the Sword of Charlemagne 3

=== Others ===
- Oriental Kitten (1975)
- Little Orphan Dusty (1978)
- Hot & Saucy Pizza Girls (1978)
- Disco Lady (1978)
- Tropic of Desire (1978)
- Candy Stripers (1978)
- Prisoner of Paradise (1980)
- Baby Cakes (1983)
- Bad Penny (1999)
- Magnum Love (1999)
- All The Way In (1984)
