= Bill Amerson =

American pornography producer and actor (1938–2015)

- Born: William Gordon Amerson; December 22, 1938; Los Angeles, California, U.S.
- Died: March 17, 2015 (aged 76–77)
- Other name: Bill Williams
- Occupations: Mogul; producer; actor

William Gordon Amerson (December 22, 1938 – March 17, 2015) was an American former adult-film industry pioneer, mogul, producer and actor in the late 1960s to the late 1980s.

Born in Los Angeles, Bill Amerson was one of the first adult film producers in the United States to produce so-called "hard core" entertainment. As reported in the documentary Wadd: The Life & Times of John C. Holmes, produced by filmmaker Cass Paley, "In these films we showed insertion. The sexual penetration and oral copulation. We actually showed it. People could not turn their money over fast enough [to see it]." To Amerson's surprise the market for this product was vastly larger than he had expected.

Amerson was also one of the early pioneers in the establishment of adult film industry to be able to ply its wares in accordance with the First Amendment to the United States Constitution. In the early days of hard core, Amerson and his colleagues were subject to arrest for any number of charges which could include pimping, pandering, and an obscure felony called "conspiracy to commit oral copulation". Ultimately courts affirmed the legality of adult film production.

== The early years ==
In the late 1960s, Amerson and a partner were running an office in Hollywood, just behind the Crossroads of the World area. They were taking still Polaroid shots for some hard core adult magazines. One day in 1969, John "Johnny Wadd" Holmes auditioned for the photo shoot. Amerson initially was not interested in Holmes as he "was not what we were looking for", but once he saw Holmes' inimitable endowment, a long-term business relationship between Holmes and Amerson was initiated, which lasted nearly twenty years. Holmes and Amerson became business partners on various ventures .

== HIV testing pioneer ==
In November 1982, after Holmes was released from the Los Angeles County Jail (after having been fully acquitted of the 1981 quadruple murder of the Wonderland Gang), Amerson and Holmes formed a business called Penguin Productions, which was involved in adult film production. Of concern to the new proprietors was the growing threat of AIDS.

In 1985, Amerson was the first name-brand hard core producer who demanded that actors be tested for HIV. Both he and Holmes were tested and came out negative. But a follow-up test over six months later showed that Holmes was infected.

Upon Holmes's death in March 1988, Amerson felt that he no longer wanted to be in the business, given the loss of his dear friend and the godfather to his son (Sean "Duke" Amerson) and daughter (Denise Amerson). In a 1987 interview, before Holmes's death but before Holmes's AIDS was public knowledge, Amerson complained "that the porn trade is 'no longer fun,' in large part because of the AIDS crisis. Despite accumulating a fortune of several million dollars".

== Acting experience ==
In addition to managing and producing Holmes, Amerson also acted in movies as diverse as Girls on Fire and The Divorcee. Often he is credited by his pseudonym, Bill Williams.

== Death ==
Amerson died on March 17, 2015 as a result of a stroke that he suffered in his Los Angeles mansion, as reported by industry website, AVN.com. He was age 76.

== Legacy ==
So fundamental was Amerson's contribution to the adult film industry is the fact that he was the inspiration for the Jack Horner character (played by Burt Reynolds) in the award-winning film Boogie Nights.
