= Veronica Vera =

American actress, writer

- Born: United States
- Occupations: Writer; actress; instructor
- Spouse: Stuart Cottingham (m. 2012; died 2019)
- Website: veronicaverawrites.com

Veronica Vera is an American human sexuality writer and actress. She founded the cross-dressing school Miss Vera's Finishing School for Boys Who Want to be Girls in New York City in 1992. She co-founded the first porn star support group, Club 90.

== Career ==
Vera is a former Wall Street trader and a doctor of human sexuality.

=== Acting and modeling ===
Vera appeared in such films as Times Square Comes Alive and modeled in an erotic photography session for Robert Mapplethorpe in 1982.

=== Writing ===
Vera wrote a monthly article in Adam magazine called "Veronica Vera's New York" that ran from 1983 to 1995. Her book Miss Vera's Finishing School for Boys Who Want to Be Girls was published by Doubleday in 1997. She has published two follow-up books: Miss Vera's Cross-Dress For Success and Miss Vera's Cross Gender Fun For All.

=== Activism ===
Vera's activist work includes a testimony she gave in 1983 that became part of the Meese Report. In 1983, she co-founded the first porn star support group, Club 90.

=== Miss Vera's Finishing School For Boys Who Want to be Girls ===
Miss Vera's Finishing School For Boys Who Want to be Girls
- Type: Private
- Industry: Courses on cross-dressing
- Founded: (1992, New York City, New York, United States
- Founder: Veronica Vera
- Headquarters: New York City, New York, United States
- Website: missvera.com

Vera founded Miss Vera's Finishing School For Boys Who Want to be Girls, a business in New York City that provides instruction in cross-dressing, in 1992. One of the school's most popular topics of instruction is walking in high-heeled shoes. In 2008, Vera said more than 5,000 people, including many women, had enrolled in this class in the previous 12 years.

== Personal life ==
Vera is a native of Linden, New Jersey. She married artist Stuart Cottingham in 2012.
