= 10th Transgender Erotica Awards =

US adult entertainment industry award

- Date: March 11, 2018
- Site: Avalon Hollywood, California
- Hosted by: Ts Madison

Highlights
- Best Film: 'Real Fucking Girls 2' – Mona Wales (Grooby)
- Most awards: Aubrey Kate; Mia Maffia; Natalie Mars (2 each)
- Most nominations: Aubrey Kate (9)

The 10th Annual Transgender Erotica Awards was a pornographic awards event recognizing the best in transgender pornography form the previous year from 15 November 2016 to 15 November 2017.

Pre-nominations opened from October 4 to October 17, 2017, and the public-at-large was able to suggest nominees using an online form. Nominees were announced on December 21, 2017, online on the theteashow.com website, with fan voting opening on the same day. The winners were announced during the awards on March 11, 2018. The awards open to fan voting were the fan award which was open to all and site-specific awards which were open to members of the forums of the specific sites who met specific criteria regarding; a number of postings and a date to have been a member before.

== Winners and nominees ==
The nominations for the 10th Transgender Erotica Awards were announced online on December 21, 2017, and opened to fan voting on the same day, when pre-nominations closed, online on the theteashow.com website. The winners were announced during the awards on March 11, 2018.

=== Awards ===
Winners are listed first, highlighted in boldface.

Best New Face	Best Transman Model
**Kayleigh Coxx**; Addi Eve; Alisa Rae; Annabelle Lane; Betty Black; Cassidy Quinn; Chanel Noir; Hummingbird; Kellie Shaw; Lily Demure; Marissa Minx; Raven Babe; Sarina Havok; Sasha de Sade; Scout London; Talia Sonata; Valentina Mia	**Eddie Wood**; Buck Angel; Cyd St.Vincent; Kipp Slinger; Luke Hudson; Nicko Wolfe; Phoenix Savage; Shin Yoshiwara; Tyler St. Syn; Victor Belmont
Best Solo Model	Best Hardcore Model
**Natalie Mars**; Addi Eve; Alisia Rae; Alexa Scout; Annabelle Lane; Aspen Brooks; Aubrey Kate; Brooke Zanell; Casey Kisses; Honey Foxxx; Kayleigh Coxx; Kendra Sinclaire; Korra Del Rio; Kylie Maria; Megan Snow; Nadia Love; Sasha de Sade; Shiri Trap	**Aubrey Kate**; Annabelle Lane; Alisia Rae; Casey Kisses; Chanel Santini; Chelsea Marie; Domino Presley; Jenny Flowers; Jelena Vermilion; Lena Kelly; Lianna Lawson; Mia Maffia; Miran; Natalie Mars; Pink Von Dee; Shiri; Trixxy Von Tease; Venus Lux
Best International Model	Ms. Unique
**Mia Maffia**; Alicia Snow; Angelina Torres; Bianka Nascimento; Carol Penelope; Eva Paradis; Gia Itzel; Jelena Vermilion; Joanna Jet; Liberty Harkness; Marissa Minx; Miran; Nikki Montero; Nikki Vidic; Sasha de Sade; Thippy; Vanessa Jhons	**Nadia Love**; Alicia Snow; Betty Black; Cassidy Quinn; Demii D Best; Jelena Vermilion; Jenny Flowers; Kacy; Kami Piper; Kimber Haven; Kristen Kraves; Jacquie Blu; Mara Nova; Raven Babe; Sarina Havok; Sadie Santanas; Trixxy von Tease
Best Scene	Best VR Scene
**Chanel Santini and Lance Hart - 'Wonder Woman'** (Transangels.com); Arabelle Raphael, Bianca Stone, Delia Delions, Freya Wynn, Mandy Mitchell, Mona Wales - 'All My Mother's Lovers' (Grooby); Annabelle Lane and Gabriel - 'TS Factor 10' (Evil Angel); Aubrey Kate and Adriana Chechik - 'Adriana Chechik Is The Squirt Queen' (Evil Angel); Betty Black and Michelle Austin - 'Betty Meets Michelle' in 'Betty Does Texas' (Michelle Austin Films); Buck Angel, Aubrey Kate, Chanel Santini - 'Buck Angel Superstar' (Transsensual); Casey Kisses and Kai Bailey - 'Pay Up, Casey' (Trans500.com); Cassidy Quinn and Lianna Lawson 'March 2017' (Tgirls.porn/Grooby); Eddie Wood and Casey Kisses - 'Transational Encounter' (ShemaleStrokers.com); Honey Foxxx and Mia Li - 'Real Fucking Girls 2' (Grooby); Jelena Vermilion and Chelsea Marie - 'Real Fucking Girls 2' (Grooby); Jessica Drake, Aubrey Kate, Domino Presley, and Venus Lux - 'Jessica Drake Is Wicked' (Wicked); Kylie Maria - 'She-Male Strokers 87' (ShemaleStrokers.com); Lena Kelly - T.S. 'Gangbang Auditions' (Gender X/Jim Powers); Lilith Lovett and Christian - 'Horny TS Gets What She Wants' (Pure-TS); Miran and Soldier Boi - 'Adorable Miran Hammered By Soldier!' (Shemale.xxx/Grooby); Miran and Mistress Lucy - 'Miran Doll' (BobsTGirls.com); Natalie Mars and Marissa Minx - 'Anal Gymnastics' (ManyVids); Natalie Mars and Mike Panic - 'My Girlfriend's Slutty Sister' (TransAngels.com); Venus Lux and Rob Yaeger - 'Let Me Teach You' (TransAngels.com)	**'Virtual Reality' - Annabelle Lane** (Grooby VR); 'Deep Examination' - Chanel Santini (VRB Trans); 'Do You Like It ?' - Bianca Hills (Virtual Real Trans); 'Eva's Bareback Creampie VR' - Eva Paradis (EvaParadisxxx.com); 'Fuck Me Now'- Vanessa Jhons (Virtual Real Trans); 'Girls want Variety' TS Princess (TSVirtualLovers); 'Hardcore Workout' - Natassia Dreams (Grooby VR); 'I Can't Believe I'm Fucking Foxxy' - Foxxy (Grooby VR); 'Introducing TS Princess' - TS Princess (TSVirtualLovers); 'Money Fucks' - Red Vex and Nicole Montero (TS VirtualLovers); 'My Stepmom is a TS' - Aubrey Kate (VRB Trans); 'Schools Out' - Alexa Scout (Grooby VR); 'Superstar Edition' - Domino Presley (Grooby VR); 'Teen Dream' - Alisia Rae (Grooby VR); 'The Bitch' - Aubrey Kate (Grooby VR); 'The Sweetest Dessert' - Jonelle Brooks (Virtual Real Trans); 'Whipped Cream Cocktail' - Foxxy (VRB Trans)
Best DVD	Black-TGirls.com Model of the Year
**'Real Fucking Girls 2' – Mona Wales** (Grooby); 'All My Mother's Lovers' – Mona Wales and Arabelle Raphael (Grooby); 'Bang My Tranny Ass 15' – Sammy Mancini (Mancini Productions); 'Betty Does Texas' – Michelle Austin and Tyler St Syn (Michelle Austin Films); 'Buck Angel Superstar' – Dana Vespoli (Transsensual); 'Eva Paradis XXX: The Real Taste of Italy' (SMC); 'Group Trans-Action' – Jim Powers (Gender X); 'Hot for Transsexuals 4' – Aiden Starr (Evil Angel); 'My Transsexual Stepsister' – Jim Powers (Gender X); 'My TS Heartthrob' – LeWood (Evil Angel); 'She-Male Strokers 89' – Sammy Mancini (Mancini Productions); 'Tgirls Porn Volume 9' – Radius Dark and Kalin London (Grooby); 'Trans on BBC' – Omar Wax (Grooby); 'TS Bad Girls Vol. 2' – Dana Vespoli (Transsensual); 'TS Factor 10' – Joey Silvera (Evil Angel); 'Two Tgirls: Schoolgirls Volume 1' – Mayumi Sparkles (Two Tgirls); 'Tyra Scott: All American Trans Superstar' – Damien Cain (Kennston Productions)	**Megan Snow**; Aqua Snow; Alana Longcawk; Amanda Coxxs; Arianna Pipes; Ariel Smith; Brooklyn; Candy Licious; Cassandra Grande; Cleopatra Blacc; Deja; Diamond Karatz; Holly Strokes; Honey Foxxx; Jada Dickens; Kami Piper; Kayla Biggs; Kendall Dreams; Kinky Khia; Kimmy; Lea Lipz; Lil Bit; Lisa Stays Hard; Natalia de Potra; Natassia Dreams; Megan Porter; Mohka; Mya Badd; Nala; Raven Babe; Salina Samone; Skylar White; Strawberrie; Tiny Tara; Tyra Alice; Yandie Lee
Best Solo Website	Best Internet Personality
**Mia Maffia – MiaMaffia.xxx**; Chanel Santini – ChanelSantini.xxx; Eva Paradis – EvaParadisxxx.com; TSJesse – TS-Jesse.com; Joanna Jet – JoannaJet.com; Krissy 4 U – Krissy4u.com; Kelly Clare – TSKellyClare.com; Kylie Maria – KylieMaria.xxx; Natalie Mars – NatalieMars.com; Sunshyne Monroe – Sunshyneland.com; Trixxy Von Tease – TrixxyVonTease.xxx; Venus Lux – Venus-Lux.com; Wendy Summers – WendySummers.com; Wendy Williams – WendyWilliams.xxx	**Natalie Mars**; Amy SpaceKitten; Aubrey Kate; Bailey Jay; Casey Kisses; Cassidy Quinn; Chanel Santini; Jacquie Blu; Jessica Fappit; Kelly Pierce; Koko Beans; Lena Kelly; Liberty Harkness; Mia Maffia; Robbi Racks; Sunshyne Monroe; Trixxy von Tease
Best Photographer	Best Scene Producer
**Radius Dark**; Amy SpaceKitten; Bob Maverick; Buddy Wood; Damien Cain; Frank; Jack Flash; Josh Stone; Kalin London; Kilakali; Louie Damazo; Mayumi Sparkles; Natasha Musto; Omar Wax; Sammy Mancini; Tom Moore; Vee Soho	**Aiden Starr**; Ariel X; Bob Maverick; Buddy Wood; Damien Cain; Dana Vespoli; Jim Powers; Joey Silvera; Josh Stone; Madeline Marlowe; Mayumi Sparkles; Michelle Austin; Mona Wales; Omar Wax; Radius Dark; Sammy Mancini; Tom Moore; Vee Soho
Best Non-TS Female Performer	Best Non-TS Male Performer
**Mona Wales**; Adriana Chechik; Arabelle Raphael; Bella Vendetta; Cameron Canela; Cherry Torn; Daisy Ducati; Ella Nova; Jasmeen LaFleur; Jessica Drake; Mercedes Carrera; Mia Li; Robin Coffins; Violet Monroe	**Soldier Boi** and **D. Arclyte** [Tie]; Chad Diamond; Christian XXX; Eli Hunter; Jaxton Wheeler; Kai Bailey; Lance Hart; Pierce Paris; Rob Yaeger; Ruckus; Sgt. Miles; Will Havoc
Grooby Girl of the Year	Kink's Kinkiest Tgirl Domme
**Shiri Allwood**	**Foxxy**
Bobs TGirls Model of the Year	Fan Choice Award
**Miran**	**Aubrey Kate**
Best Industry Professional	Transcendence Award
**John Stagliano**	**Kelly Klaymour**
Gender X Model of the Year	Cam Performer of the Year
**Chanel Santini**	**Casey Kisses** and **Korra Del Rio** [Tie]
Transational Fantasy Girl of the Year	Outstanding Service Award
**Brooke Zanell**	**Morgan Bailey**
Lifetime Achievement Award
**Nicole Montero** and **Jesse Flores**
