= Sexually transmitted infections in the pornography industry =

Occupational safety and health issue in the sex industry

Workers in the sex industry deal with the occupational safety and health hazard of contracting sexually transmitted infections (STIs). Since the 1980s many cases of pornographic performers contracting HIV/AIDS have been reported. However, since the mid-2000s strict adherence to rigorous STI testing, and limiting sexual contact with only fellow tested performers has halted the spread of HIV and other STIs in the industry.

== Types of STIs ==
Experts suggest there are a total number of thirty-five infections and diseases that can be transmitted sexually. Because pornographic film making involves unsimulated sex, often without condoms, pornographic actors are particularly vulnerable to various sexually transmitted infections; especially HPV, Zika fever, chlamydia, gonorrhea, syphilis, and HIV/AIDS.

== HIV cases ==
=== 1980s and 1990s ===
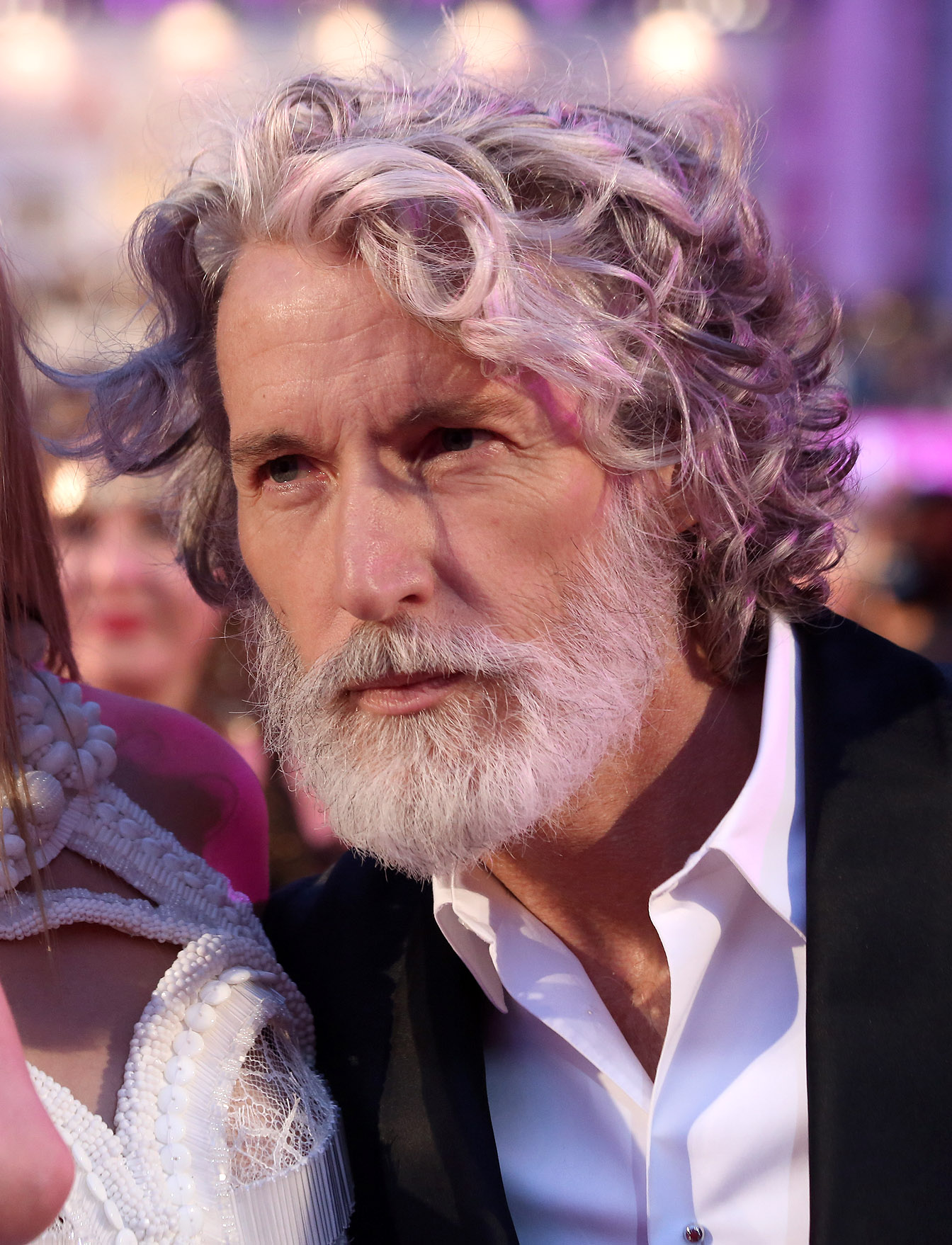
Aiden Shaw became HIV positive in 1997.

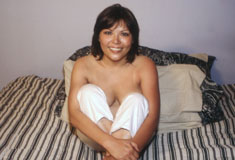
Brooke Ashley became HIV positive in 1998 but returned to pornography in 2005 in a film with her boyfriend Eddie Wood, who was also HIV positive.

According to former pornographic actress Shelley Lubben, a 1980s outbreak of HIV led to the death of 27 porn stars between 1985 and 1992, including Wade Nichols (who died in 1985), John Holmes (1988), Marc Stevens (1989), and Al Parker (1992). When Nichols died in 1985, his fellow porn star Ron Jeremy denied that Nichols' death was AIDS-related. Stevens died of AIDS in 1989, aged 46. Parker died in 1992 from complications of AIDS, aged 40.

In February 1986, Holmes was diagnosed as HIV-positive. Six months previously, he had tested negative. During the summer of 1986, Holmes, knowing his HIV status, agreed to perform in two pornographic films to be filmed in Italy, without informing the producers of his HIV status. Performers in one film, The Rise and Fall of the Roman Empress, were Ilona "Cicciolina" Staller, who later became a member of the Italian parliament, Tracey Adams, Christoph Clark, and Amber Lynn. Performers in the other film, The Devil In Mr. Holmes, were Adams, Lynn, Karin Schubert, and Marina Hedman. Subsequently, it was revealed that Holmes had consciously chosen not to reveal his HIV status to his producers or co-stars before engaging in unprotected sex for the filming. As his health failed, Holmes disingenuously attributed his condition to colon cancer and first confided that he had AIDS in January 1987. He died from AIDS-related complications on March 13, 1988, aged 43.

Marc Wallice, a known IV drug user, tested positive for HIV in 1998. On April 30, 1998, he was diagnosed by Adult Industry Medical (AIM) as HIV positive. It was alleged that he had hidden his HIV positive status for two years, with rumors that he accomplished this by using fake blood work through several HIV testing cycles to continue working. This speculation has been disputed and investigated using Wallice's tests, but it has not been doubted that during this period Wallice infected seven women on the set: Brooke Ashley, Tricia Devereaux, Caroline, Nena Cherry, Jordan McKnight, Barbara Doll, and Kimberly Jade.

=== 2000s ===
After three years of no reported HIV-issues within the industry, in April 2004, AIM diagnosed Darren James as being HIV-positive. It was concluded that James had been infected while engaging in unprotected anal sex with Brazilian actress Bianca Biaggi during a scene for the video Split That Booty 2 in Rio de Janeiro. AIM initiated an urgent search for other potentially infected performers. It was discovered that three actresses who had worked with James shortly after his return to the United States had also become infected. These were Canadians Lara Roxx and Miss Arroyo, and Czech-born Jessica Dee.

The heterosexual segment of the porn industry voluntarily shut down for 30 days (a 60-day moratorium was originally announced but it was lifted early) while it tried to deal with the situation. Darren James, Jessica Dee, and Lara Roxx were barred from further production of sexually explicit content. About 60 actors who had had contact with James or Roxx were barred from working until HIV tests were completed and they were declared HIV negative. A further estimated 130 actors who had had contact with James were tested and received an HIV-negative result. A total of five actors were diagnosed with the virus by the end of the moratorium: one male and four females, including one transgender woman named Jennifer.

In June 2009, AIM reported that a female adult entertainer had tested positive, though it was believed that transmission occurred in her private life. LA County Public Health claimed that there had been 16 "unreported" HIV cases in the adult film industry. The AIM Healthcare Foundation claimed those cases did not involve actors in production companies that followed their testing protocols and included members of the general public who used AIM Healthcare testing services or individuals attempting to work in the porn industry who never were able to obtain employment in adult films because of their failure to provide proof of negative status for HIV or other STIs.

=== 2010s ===
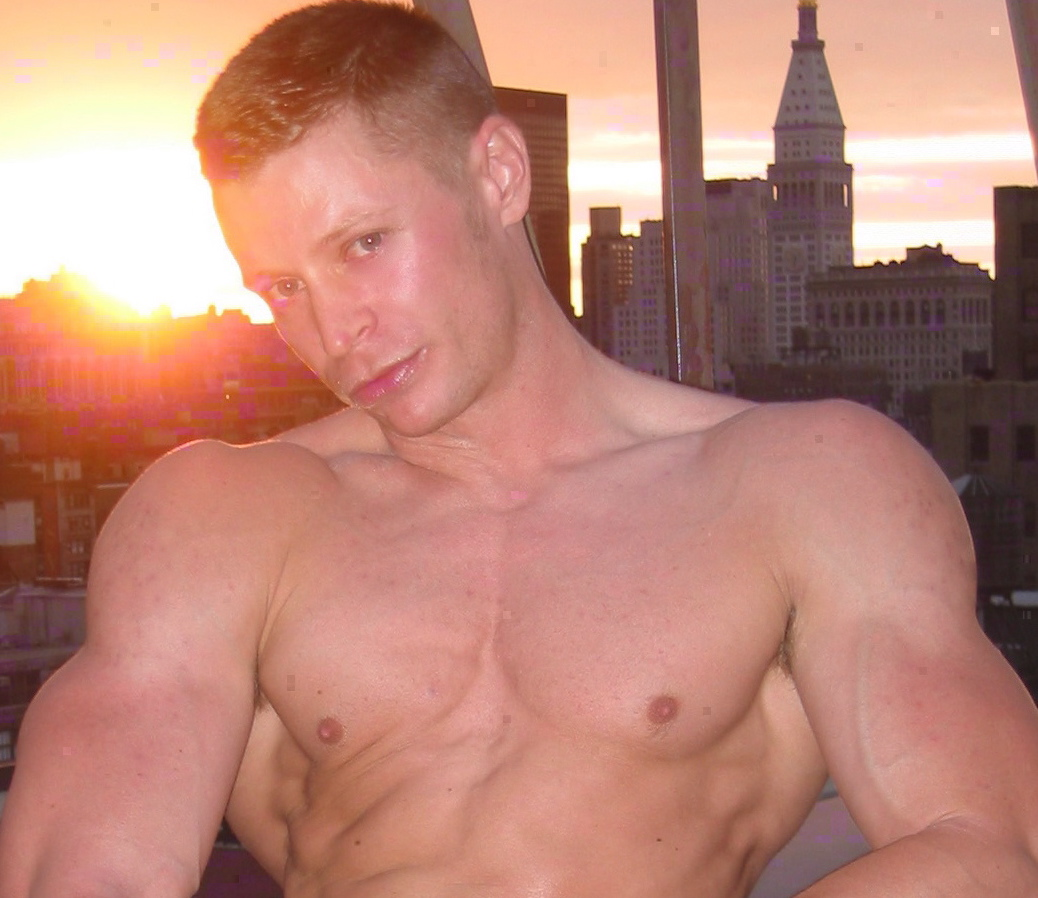
Josh Weston died due to AIDS in 2012.

On October 12, 2010, AIM reported that an actor or actress had been infected with HIV. The name and gender of the person was not released to the public. Vivid Entertainment and Wicked Pictures were the first companies to announce a production shutdown. Although Wicked Pictures allow some performers to wear condoms, the company shut down to wait for the quarantine list. Several other porn studios shut down as a preventive measure. At the time, no other performers tested HIV positive.

In December, the HIV positive performer was identified as Derrick Burts. Burts had worked in both heterosexual and gay pornography. Despite contracting gonorrhea, chlamydia and syphilis, Burts continued taking part in unprotected sex in films before quitting once he was diagnosed as being HIV positive. He was informed by the Adult Industry Medical Health Care Foundation that he had contracted the disease, which according to Burts, he received on a set outside the AIM system, while having oral sex scene with another "HIV positive male actor".

In June 2013, a gay male performer tested positive for HIV in a routine FSC-conducted blood test. The anonymous performer had previously worked exclusively on condom-only movies. FSC determined that the infection did not take place on-set.

In August 2013, an adult female performer, Cameron Bay, tested HIV positive. In response, FSC organized an industry wide moratorium from August 21 to August 27. On September 4, Rod Daily, Cameron Bay's ex-boyfriend, announced he had also tested HIV positive. Two days later, a third anonymous female performer tested positive prompting FSC to organize a second moratorium from September 6 to September 20. All three infections were found to have taken place off-set. Rumors surfaced of a fourth HIV positive test during September but they were never substantiated.

In December 2013, a male porn actor tested HIV positive, leading FSC to halt production for one week. This infection was also determined to have taken place off-set.

== Testing and clinics ==
The Adult Industry Medical Health Care Foundation (AIM Healthcare or AIM) was founded in 1998, and helped to set up a monitoring system for the pornographic film industry in the United States, and pornographic film actors were required to be tested for HIV, chlamydia and gonorrhea every 30 days, and twice a year for hepatitis, syphilis and HSV. However AIM closed all its operations in May 2011, forcing the industry to look for other mechanisms for supporting and enforcing regular testing. The gap was filled by the Free Speech Coalition, which set up the Adult Production Health and Safety Services (APHSS) system, now known as Performer Availability Screening Services (PASS). Since 2011, STI testing for straight pornographic performers is being monitored by them.

Apart from taking necessary precautions like PrEP, performers are tested every fourteen days for HIV, syphilis, gonorrhea, chlamydia, hepatitis B and C and trichomoniasis. According to PASS, there has not been an on-set transmission of HIV on a regulated set since 2004. The industry considers the testing method to be a viable practice for safer sex. Canadian doctor and HIV/AIDS specialist Dr. Allan Ronald, who did groundbreaking studies on the transmission of STIs, said there's no doubt about the efficiency of the testing method, but he felt a little uncomfortable, "because it’s giving the wrong message — that you can have multiple sex partners without condoms — but I can’t say it doesn’t work.

Pornographic actress Nina Hartley, stated that the time required for shooting a scene can be very long, and usage of condoms will be uncomfortable, as it causes friction burn, and opens up lesions in the genital mucosa. Advocating the testing method for performers, Hartley said, "Testing works for us, and condoms work for outsiders." Other female performers have also opposed the use of condoms at work. Citing the fact that chances for performers in the industry to contract HIV are much lower compared to sexually active persons outside the industry, they have vehemently opposed Measure B regulations which made the use of condoms mandatory in pornographic films. Their usage has been called an occupational hazard because of the breakage issues, causation of micro-tears, swelling, and yeast infections; which together all made them more susceptible for STIs. (Note: She didn't know that the dangers of it, like if the condom breaks, and that we could get more STI's with the micro-tears, and just the condoms in general: Swelling, yeast infections, things of that nature—she just had no idea. After hours of sex with no breaks, attempting to endure the friction of the condom in your vagina or anus is...impossible. And to do this daily amounts to an occupational work hazard. Of course, due to the lack of respect towards the adult business and blatant disregard from society regarding the sexual comfort or even opinions of female performers, none of this mattered. No one asked us.)

"We're tested every fourteen days. That is literally twenty-three more times than the average American. If that person makes it to their yearly physical. I have met tons of people that haven't been to the doctor in years. That scares me because they have no idea what their status is.... I don't hook up with people outside of the porn industry because I'm terrified. And I'm not the only one. There's many performers that know: if you go out into the wild, you will come back with something." — Ash Hollywood (Porn actress).

=== Limitations and criticism ===
As the Centers for Disease Control and Prevention (CDC) recommends screening for Herpes only in symptomatic cases, most STI tests do not include screening for either HSV-1 or HSV-2 strain unless specifically ordered by the physician. Meanwhile, asymptomatic persons positive for the virus can transmit it sexually.

Porn actors are not tested for HPV either. A test for HPV is not normally included in a standard STI screening for people under 30, as many of the HPV strains clear on their own. It's however recommend once for every five years in people above 30.

== Legislation ==
=== Regulations to limit the spread of HIV ===
Due to this limited outbreak, the California State government considered regulating the industry. Some proposed to mandate the wearing of condoms during sexually explicit scenes. Industry insiders say this would ruin sales since the unprotected content is one of the selling points of some of their films. They say the wearing of condoms ruins the sexual fantasies of many viewers. Insiders say that such regulation would force the industry underground, out of California or overseas where it would be more prone to health risks for performers. The non-profit Adult Industry Medical Health Care Foundation (AIM Healthcare) worked with the government, to develop policies that both the industry and the government would find acceptable.

=== 2012 ballot measure in Los Angeles ===
In the 2012 election, voters in Los Angeles were presented with Measure B ("Safer Sex In the Adult Film Industry Act") with the following text:

Shall an ordinance be adopted requiring producers of adult films to obtain a County public health permit, to require adult film performers to use condoms while engaged in sex acts, to provide proof of blood borne pathogen training course, to post permit and notices to performers, and making violations of the ordinance subject to civil fines and criminal charges?

Proponents of the measure claimed pornography performers were significantly more likely to acquire HIV than the general population and that they are generally not given health insurance by their employers and so the tax payer would foot the bill for HIV treatment. Opponents claimed it to be a waste of tax dollars because of existing stringent HIV testing protocols and because nobody has contracted HIV on set since 2004 in the United States.

The adult film industry members claimed that the industry monitors itself, and people will not watch scenes with condoms. The measure passed with 56% voting for and 44% voting against. FSC said it will appeal the law on constitutional grounds.

The AIDS Healthcare Foundation tried several times to have California's Department of Industrial Relations, Division of Occupational Safety and Health's Appeals Board force companies in the pornography industry to treat actors and actresses as employees subject to occupational safety and health regulation; in a 2014 case brought against Treasure Island Media an administrative judge found that the company did have to comply with regulations.

== See also ==
- Adult Industry Medical Health Care Foundation (AIM)
- AIDS Healthcare Foundation

== Sources cited ==
=== Books ===
- Basten, Fred; Holmes, Laurie; Holmes, John C. (1998). Porn King: The John Holmes Story. John Holmes Inc. ISBN 978-1-880047-69-9.
- Edmonson, Roger (2000). Clone: The Life and Legacy of Al Parker, Gay Superstar. Alyson Books. p. 205. ISBN 978-1555835293.
- Hawes, William (2009). Caligula and the fight for artistic freedom: the making, marketing and impact of the Bob Guccione film. McFarland. p. 203. ISBN 978-0-7864-3986-7.
- Jennings, David (2000). "Chapter 20: AIDS and Other Four-Letter Words". Skinflicks: The Inside Story of the X-Rated Video Industry. David Jennings. ISBN 978-1-58721-184-3.
- Various (2008). Patrick, John (ed.). Huge. STARbooks. p. 13. ISBN 978-1-934187-29-6.

=== Journals and magazines ===
- Grudzen, CR; Meeker, D; Torres, J; Du, Q; Andersen, RM; Gelberg, L (February 2013). "HIV and STI risk behaviors, knowledge, and testing among female adult film performers as compared to other California women". AIDS and Behavior. 17 (2): 517–22. doi:10.1007/s10461-011-0090-0. PMID 22101890. S2CID 6446061.
- Goldstein, BY; Steinberg, JK; Aynalem, G; Kerndt, PR (July 2011). "High Chlamydia and gonorrhea incidence and reinfection among performers in the adult film industry". Sexually Transmitted Diseases. 38 (7): 644–8. doi:10.1097/OLQ.0b013e318214e408. PMID 21844714. S2CID 2855793.
- Grudzen, CR; Kerndt, PR (2007). "The adult film industry: time to regulate?". PLOS Med. 4 (6): e126. doi:10.1371/journal.pmed.0040126. PMC 1892037. PMID 17579507.
- Rodriguez-Hart, C; Chitale, RA; Rigg, R; Goldstein, BY; Kerndt, PR; Tavrow, P (December 2012). "Sexually transmitted infection testing of adult film performers: is disease being missed?". Sexually Transmitted Diseases. 39 (12): 989–94. doi:10.1097/OLQ.0b013e3182716e6e. PMID 23191956. S2CID 11721333.
- Webber, Valerie (2021). "Crossovers and Consent: Underlying Assumptions in Porn Health Protocol". Synoptique. 9 (2): 183–200, 408. ProQuest 2825443028.

=== News and websites ===
- Allen, Jane E. (2010). "Actor's Positive HIV Test Disrupts Filming as Clinic Traces On-Screen Sex Partners". ABC News. American Broadcasting Company.
  - Carroll, Rory (25 August 2013). "US porn actor's HIV test prompts calls for moratorium on production". The Guardian. Los Angeles.
- Duke, Diane (9 September 2013). "Moratorium Update". Free Speech Coalition. Archived from the original on 5 December 2013.
- Fitz-Gerald, Sean (27 January 2014). "Condoms Required for CA Porn Performers: Judge". NBC Southern California.
- Forster, Josephine (23 December 2010). "Derrick Burts: HIV in pornography: the naked truth". The Independent. London.
- Hamm, Gregory (July 7, 2006). "Between the sheets: Gay porn star Aiden Shaw does little to illuminate his life in memoir 'My Undoing'". Washington Blade. Archived from the original on 8 March 2012.
- Holden, Stephen (12 January 2001). "WADD: The Life and Times of John C. Holmes". New York Times (movie review).
- Hennessy-Fiske, Molly; Lin II, Rong-Gong (12 October 2010). "Porn Actor has Tested Positive for HIV; Industry Clinic Officials Confirm a Quarantine is in Effect". Los Angeles Times. Archived from the original on 13 October 2010.
- Hennessy-Fiske, Molly (12 October 2010). "Wicked Pictures and Vivid Entertainment Suspend Production as a Precaution Amid New HIV Case in Porn Performer". Los Angeles Times. Archived from the original on 16 October 2010.
- Hennessy-Fiske, Molly (22 October 2010). "HIV Tests Negative for Porn Actors Who Performed with 'Patient Zero'". Los Angeles Times. Archived from the original on 24 October 2010.
- Hennessy-Fiske, Molly (8 December 2010). "HIV-positive porn performer speaks out". Los Angeles Times.
- Hay, Mark (27 September 2019). "The Rift in the Porn World About How to Approach HIV". Rewire.News.
- Kernes, Mark (11 March 1999). "Marc Wallice Speaks Out on his Role in the HIV Controversy: "Brooke Ashley Is Off Her Fucking Rocker!"". Adult Video News. Archived from the original on 2 March 2014.
- Kemp, Joe (23 August 2013). "Porn star Cameron Bay tests positive for HIV". New York Daily News.
- Kernes, Mark (23 June 2014). "Adult Actresses Deliver Petitions to Isadore Hall Office-UPDATED". AVN.com. Adult Video News. Archived from the original on 27 June 2014.
- Lubben, Shelley (3 September 2013). "STD and HIV Outbreaks in the Porn Industry Since the 1980s". pornharmsresearch.com (compilation). Morality in Media.
- Lupkin, Sydney (23 August 2013). "Porn Star Cameron Bay Opens Up About HIV Scare". Nightline ABC News.
- McNeil Jr., Donald G. (5 November 2012). "Unlikely Model in H.I.V. Efforts: Sex Film Industry". The New York Times. Archived from the original on 10 July 2022.
- Madigan, Nick (10 May 2004). "Voice of Health in a Pornographic World". The New York Times.
- MOHAJER, SHAYA TAYEFE (13 October 2010). "Positive HIV Test Halts Porn Shoots at Companies". Yahoo! News. Archived from the original on 15 October 2010.
- Miles, Kathleen (6 December 2013). "Yet Another HIV-Positive Porn Performer Leads To Third Shutdown". Huffington Post.
- Ross, Gene (27 May 2007). "Lara Roxx Timeline Begs Questions: Darren James got it from Lara Roxx, not the other way around?". Adult FYI. Archived from the original on 13 March 2008.
- Roberts, Kelli (25 January 2017). "Why don't we test for HPV or Herpes in porn?". Adult Industry News.
- Romero, Dennis (3 May 2011). "Porn Clinic AIM Closes For Good: Valley-Based Industry Scrambles to Find New STD Testing System". LA Weekly. Archived from the original on 7 May 2011.
- Reign, Tasha (8 April 2013). "Tasha Tells All...On LA County's Measure B Condom Law". OC Weekly. Archived from the original on February 22, 2014.
- Staff (11 August 2005). "Powers Shoots HIV-Positive, Hetero Scene". Adult Video News. Archived from the original on 5 May 2010.
- Staff (1 December 2005). "AVN Reviews: Dirty Debutantes 2005 327 & 328". Adult Video News.
- Staff (18 March 1999). "Marc Wallice Closer to Vindication?". Adult Video News. Archived from the original on 2 March 2014.
- Staff (2009). "Test Results Pending for Two Performers". Adult Video News. Archived from the original on 18 June 2009.
- Staff (5 May 2004). "Another First-Gen Woman Diagnosed as HIV-Positive". Adult Video News. Archived from the original on 21 August 2009.
- Staff (26 April 2004). "Viral Load Results Indicate James was 'Patient Zero'". Adult Video News.
- Sewell, Abby (24 August 2013). "Porn actress' positive HIV test roils adult entertainment world". The Los Angeles Times.
- Scheeres, Julia (2007). "The Wonderland Murders". Turner Entertainment Networks. Archived from the original on 24 October 2007.
- Strauss, Eric M. (19 February 2009). "Porn Industry Still Struggles With Condom Issue". ABC News. American Broadcasting Company.
- Viladevall, Ferrán (16 May 2014). "La mala vida del rey del porno". El Mundo (Spain) (in Spanish).
- Williams, Mitchell (21 November 2012). "How a Straight Adult Performer Convinced Me That Condoms Are Useless in Porn". Huffington Press. Archived from the original on 5 June 2022.
- Yoshino, Kimi; Lin II, Rong-Gong (12 June 2009). "More porn HIV cases disclosed". Los Angeles Times. Archived from the original on 15 June 2009.
- "Los Angeles voters approve mandating condom use by porn performers; industry plans lawsuit". Yahoo.com. Associated press. 8 November 2012.
- "Measure B: Safer Sex In the Adult Film Industry Act - Los Angeles County, CA". 17 December 2012.
- "Cameron Bay Called Michael Whiteacre Last Night". TRPWL.com. 18 July 2014. Archived from the original on 29 September 2022.
- "AIDS in pornography industry of California contained says adult industry body". 26 April 2004. Archived from the original on 15 August 2009.
- "Rod Daily, Gay Porn Star, Says He is HIV Positive". Huffington Post. 4 September 2013.
- "Adult Performer Tests Positive for HIV". Sex.com. 17 June 2013. Archived from the original on 27 August 2013.
- "Pyramid of potential infection". Los Angeles Times. 16 April 2004. Archived from the original on 2009-06-14.
- "FSC Pass". Archived from the original on 12 October 2022.
- "FSC Announces Moratorium To Life On Friday, September 20". Free Speech Coalition. September 2013. Archived from the original on 12 June 2014.
- "Moratorium FAQs". FreeSpeechCoalition.com. 28 August 2014.
- "CDC – Genital Herpes Screening". Centers for Disease Control and Prevention. 11 January 2019.
- "Viral Genealogy Conclusive: Positive Performer from December Moratorium Contracted Virus in Personal Life". PASS Blog. 20 December 2013. Archived from the original on 13 June 2014.
