= 2012 Los Angeles Measure B =

Referendum on the adult film industry

Measure B - 2012
- County of Los Angeles Safer Sex In the Adult Film Industry Act

Results
Choice	Votes	%
Yes	1,617,866	56.96%
No	1,222,681	43.04%
Total votes	2,840,547	100.00%
Registered voters/turnout	4,593,621	61.84%

Measure B, also known as the County of Los Angeles Safer Sex In the Adult Film Industry Act, is the law that requires the use of condoms in all vaginal and anal sex scenes in pornography productions filmed in Los Angeles County, California. The measure also requires porn production companies to obtain a health permit prior to production and to post the permit and a notice to performers regarding condom use during production. All individuals involved will also be required to pay $1,600 every 2 years.

The measure was put to the voters in November 2012 and passed with 57% of the vote. The substance of the law was upheld on appeal in 2014.

== History ==
In 2009, similar legislation was introduced at the State level. Citing an HIV positive test for a performer in May of that year, the Los Angeles County Board of Supervisors sought to find a sponsor for a bill to mandate condom use in adult films. They had originally approved a resolution to seek legislation in October 2008, and made it part of their official state legislative agenda in December. The primary testing center at the time was the Adult Industry Medical Health Care Foundation (AIM). Prior to this, in 2004, there were several related cases of HIV positive tests reported. Of the twenty-two reported cases roughly half were among men who work in gay films, while the rest were both men and women working in heterosexual productions.

Measure B was voted on November 6, 2012, and passed with 55.9% of the vote.

== Campaign ==
=== Support ===
In 2012 proponents gathered 372,000 voter signatures through a citizens' initiative in Los Angeles County to put Measure B on the 2012 ballot. Supporters of Measure B said it would stop the spread of STDs in the porn industry and protect tax dollars.

Supporters included porn performer Aurora Snow, Jenna Jameson, Pink Cross Foundation, and Michael Weinstein, president of the AIDS Healthcare Foundation. Weinstein claims that according to the Los Angeles County Public Health Department, "thousands of performers have been infected with thousands of STDs over the last few years."

=== Opposition ===
The No On Government Waste Committee opposed Measure B claiming it would waste tax-payer money and drive the porn industry out of the state. It said that it was supported in its opposition by the Los Angeles County Federation of Republican Women, Los Angeles County Republican and Libertarian Parties, and the Log Cabin Republicans of Los Angeles.

The Los Angeles Times and Los Angeles Daily News both editorialized in opposition to Measure B.

Opponents include porn performers Kayden Kross, Ava Addams, Ron Jeremy, Tera Patrick and Tanya Tate.

Tate was quoted in a San Fernando Valley Business Journal article to the effect that she would want whomever she decided to have sex with "to get tested until I felt comfortable to sleep with them without a condom," adding that AIDS Healthcare Foundation president Michael Weinstein (who the article was about), "should be spending money on treating [AIDS] and educating regular people about how to protect themselves instead of going after a small community that is aware of the risks."

Pornographic actress Nina Hartley, who has a degree in nursing, said: "Shooting scenes with condoms are noticeably more uncomfortable." She said they cause friction burns vaginally and anally, that they slip off and rip, and that they get stuck inside. "They aren't built to withstand our shoots," she said. Stoya, another female performer in adult films, said, "If you condense the amount of time we were actually having sex, it probably added up to almost four to five hours."

== After effects ==
=== Technical opposition ===
In January 2014, Falcon Entertainment countered the ban after its passing by using post-production editing to remove the condoms from footage in its film California Dreamin' 1; the edits were intentional, as the film was intended to reflect the "carefree and spontaneous" style of the 1970s and 80s.

The financial and technical viability of this was challenged by an expert in videography in 2009. Axel Braun, in his experience as a director and the owner of the post-production company Level 5 Post, reiterated this in 2014.

=== Commentary ===
In her first column for the OC Weekly, performer Tasha Reign reiterated Hartley and Stoya's comments regarding the impracticality of imposing condoms on the industry. Reign said, "Want to know a dirty secret that Measure B proponents, who say what they did was in the interest of us supposedly helpless performers, never brought up? After hours of sex with no breaks, attempting to endure the friction of the condom in your vagina or anus is...impossible. And to do this daily amounts to an occupational work hazard. Of course, due to the lack of respect towards the adult business and blatant disregard from society regarding the sexual comfort or even opinions of female performers, none of this mattered. No one asked us."

In November 2012, Vivid Entertainment CEO Steven Hirsch and pornographic actors Dahlia Sky, Penny Pax, Veruca James, Steven St. Croix and Michael Vegas appeared in a video titled "Thank You From the Porn Industry" for Funny or Die. The video lampoons Measure B and requiring the use of condoms in all sex scenes filmed in Los Angeles County.

=== Industry exodus from Los Angeles County ===
2013

Industry and agency officials say there has been a shift in where porn is made, and estimated the potential economic impact at US$6 billion. In November 2013, Diane Duke, executive director of industry trade group Free Speech Coalition, said, "Fewer people are shooting (adult film) in L.A. County, and some have moved to other areas around California or other states...". Two months later, The Verge reported, "in the midst of rampant piracy on top of Measure B, many studios have relocated to Las Vegas, where filmmaking is cheaper and regulations are more lax." Then in September 2014, Robert Lang, director of Brookings Mountain West (a collaboration of UNLV and the Brookings Institution to study issues facing the Intermountain West region), was quoted as saying, "Some big part of it will stay (in LA) and production companies will continue to be based there, so it's not accurate to say that all of that $6 billion translates to Southern Nevada. But what it also gives to Las Vegas is that it's building technical capacity that undergirds non-pornographic production and media. It adds some competitive advantage in scale to Los Angeles."

In the months after the measure passed, production companies began seeking shooting locations outside of Los Angeles County. In the Ventura County city of Camarillo, CA, the city council passed a forty-five-day moratorium on the issuance of film permits, including special-event and conditional-use permits, for porn productions due to the increased number of applications.

A year after the passing of the measure, it was reported that prior to Measure B typically up to 500 permits would be applied for in Los Angeles County with FilmL.A., the nonprofit that processes permits for motion picture, television and commercial productions. In 2013, applications were received for twenty-four permits. A spokesman with the county's Department of Public Health said that eleven health permits were requested by adult-film studios.

2014

One of the industry's largest producers, Vivid Entertainment, has gone outside Los Angeles County since the law took effect. Co-founder Steven Hirsch said, "We will not be shooting in L.A. under the current situation, which is too bad," "There's a uniqueness to L.A. you can't find anywhere such as backdrops. It's also impacted us financially because shooting outside the county can become more expensive." Some production moved to Las Vegas citing a more favorable environment. Clark County, where Las Vegas is located, does not require health permits and gives out location licenses for a nominal fee; filming permits in Los Angeles County can cost hundreds of dollars.

In September 2014, the Las Vegas Sun featured an article about the adult industry's possible relocation from Southern California to Las Vegas. According to commentary by AVN magazine's political analyst Mark Kernes, the author of the Sun article, Andrea Domanick, "manages to make a few good points—and snags some quotes from Kink.com CEO Peter Acworth". In the article Acworth is quoted as saying, "Vegas is looking more and more attractive as time goes by... I think that a lot of companies are doing what we're doing. They're setting up satellite offices and getting their feet wet with Vegas as a potential place to shoot. The move is happening, but quietly. They don't want a target on their back." Acworth had announced several weeks earlier that he was shopping for office/production space in Las Vegas. The article also mentions the ease of production relative to California by stating that Nevada requires film permits only for specific locations and conditions. It states, "Shooting on private property, frequently the choice of porn producers, requires no permit or notification, and the state has no explicit regulations about condom use." The article also quotes a technician with knowledge of the mainstream film industry in Southern California and Nevada. Jim Reid of JR Lighting, one of Nevada's largest production rental companies stated, "A lot of people I know in the mainstream industry started out in the adult industry in California. It's a very good training ground."

In December, after the ruling of the Ninth Circuit Court of Appeals regarding the measure, it was announced that applications for permits for pornographic productions has reduced by 95%.

=== State legislation - AB1576 ===
On January 30, 2014, California Assemblyperson Isadore Hall (D – Compton, 64th District) introduced Assembly Bill 1576. Like its failed predecessor, AB640 in 2013 (also introduced by Hall), the bill is a statewide version of Measure B that affects Los Angeles County only and makes it a criminal offense to violate its provisions. The bill also imposes a controversial government mandate on testing, forcing producers to disclose performers' STI test details to the Department of Industrial Relations. As of June 2014 the bill has passed through the following committees: Labor and Employment (April 1); Arts, Entertainment, Sports, Tourism, and Internet Media (April 28); Appropriations (May 20); Assembly Floor Analysis (May 22).

In June five adult actresses met with Hall's district director, Heather Hutt, at the legislator's office on Artesia Boulevard in Compton and presented 650 signed petitions asking that the Assemblyman withdraw his "condoms in porn" bill. At the meeting with Hutt were adult film actresses Nina Hartley, Alex Chance and Anikka Albrite, along with industry newcomers Mia Li and Charli Piper and Michael Stabile, a publicist who has been working with Free Speech Coalition (FSC) and Kink.com on the issue. The group expressed their disappointment with the bill and the fact that it had been created with no input from adult industry representatives. In an interview with AVN magazine, Chance stated the following,

We told [Hutt] we have our own self-regulation..." "We told her we wanted to have our voices heard. They'd had no performer input on this. About condoms and chafing and micro-tears, it didn't seem like she really knew all the details of that. She compared it to a dentist being forced to wear gloves, and maybe it's a little uncomfortable. She didn't realize why we have to have sex from 45 minutes to an hour, sometimes longer, and why that was necessary. She didn't know that the dangers of it, like if the condom breaks, and that we could get more STI's with the micro-tears, and just the condoms in general: Swelling, yeast infections, things of that nature—she just had no idea." "She also didn't know about the doctors with the FSC that help make the decisions," Chance added. "It's not just a couple of people in a building making decisions for the whole industry. They don't even make decisions on the moratoriums; a doctor does, and she had no idea about that and what the testing protocols—how the doctors work with them to make the most safe tests available; she had no idea.

In the thirty-five minute meeting Director Hutt mentioned that in the 2012 election the most votes cast in any district in favor of passage of Measure B came from Hall's district. Actress Nina Hartley countered that although Measure B and AB 1576 were written by policy makers at AIDS Healthcare Foundation, the AHF had yet to open a clinic in Compton which has one of the highest HIV infection rates in Los Angeles County.

=== Proposition 60 ===
In 2016, the AIDS Healthcare Foundation backed Proposition 60, which would have enacted a condom mandate similar to Measure B statewide. Proposition 60 was defeated at the polls.

== Legal appeal ==
=== 2013 ===
In January 2013, Universal City-based Vivid Entertainment filed a lawsuit against the Los Angeles County health department saying that the measure violated actors' rights to free speech and expression. In August 2013, U.S. District Judge Dean Pregerson delivered a mixed ruling to the adult film industry saying that while making actors wear condoms during porn shoots does not violate the First Amendment, enforcing such a law raises constitutional questions, and denied the adult film industry's motion for a preliminary injunction.

Judge Pregerson agreed that some of the provisions and language of measure were too vague and did not sufficiently explain condom use when other sex acts were being filmed. He also questioned the manner of inspections to be conducted and agreed with the industry that their rights could be violated. Pregerson wrote, "Given that adult filming could occur almost anywhere, Measure B would seem to authorize a health officer to enter and search any part of a private home in the middle of the night, because he suspects violations are occurring. This is unconstitutional because it is akin to a general warrant...".

Both sides considered the judgment a victory. Vivid Entertainment founder and co-chairman Steven Hirsch said in a statement that he is pleased with the decision regarding the enforcement questions, but plans to appeal the part of the ruling that upholds the measure. He stated, "We won most everything we sought to be determined unconstitutional with Measure B. We are, however, disappointed the Court found it necessary to rewrite a portion of the measure in order to salvage a small portion of the measure and refused, at this time, to accept the adult industry's own regulations by imposing an unfunded mandate upon the county by AHF." AIDS Healthcare Foundation president Michael Weinstein stated, "Today's ruling that requiring condoms in porn is constitutional is just a tremendous, tremendous victory, one that will go a long way to safeguard the health and safety of those adult performers working in the industry." Vivid filed an appeal.

=== 2014 ===
In March 2014, the appeal of Judge Pregerson's ruling was argued before the Ninth Circuit Court of Appeals, with a three-judge panel asking questions to both the appellants and the appellee, which was the AIDS Healthcare Foundation (AHF) rather than the lawsuit's official defendant, Los Angeles County. The panel for the Ninth Circuit Court of Appeals was presided over by Chief Judge Alex Kozinski, and included Circuit Judge Susan P. Graber, a Clinton appointee, and U.S. District Judge Jack Zouhary of the U.S. District Court for the Northern District of Ohio, a George W. Bush appointee (sitting by designation).

On December 15, the appeals court panel affirmed the lower court's order denying a motion to overturn Measure B. In the ruling, it was stated that "the district court did not abuse its discretion in holding that the invalid portions of Measure B (allowing for modification, suspension, and revocation of permits; authorizing administrative searches; and allowing discretion in setting fees) were severable.” The effect of which is that the court upheld the portions of the measure not struck down by the lower court. The court also took the position that "the condom mandate ... has only a de minimis (negligible) effect on expression." According to AVN magazine legal analyst Mark Kernes this position ignores "the fact that historically, every company that has adopted a mandatory condom policy has experienced a drop in sales, which translates to a decreased ability to have its message seen by the public."

Regarding the ruling, Diane Duke, CEO of the Free Speech Coalition, stated,

While this intermediate decision allows that condoms may be mandated, it doesn't mean they should be. We have spent the last two years fighting for the rights of adult performers to make their own decisions about their bodies, and against the stigma against adult film performers embodied in the statute. Rather than protect adult performers, a condom mandate pushes a legal industry underground where workers are less safe. This is terrible policy that has been defeated in other legislative venues.

AHF president Michael Weinstein stated,

Today's ruling is a total vindication of AHF's position. We call on Los Angeles County for full enforcement of this law now. As the lower court said, they need to set fees based on actual cost. The porn industry has considered every option but following the law. Now it's time to do what fifty-seven percent of Los Angeles County voters have asked of the industry—and what the courts have upheld as constitutional.

He further stated that he hoped the adult entertainment industry will continue to appeal, taking the case to the U.S. Supreme Court, for a final and definitive ruling, however, on September 5, 2016, the Los Angeles County Board of Supervisors voted to settle the case against Vivid.

== See also ==
- Adult Industry Medical Health Care Foundation
- HIV/AIDS in the pornographic film industry
- Performer Availability Screening Services
- Pornography in the United States
