= 9th Transgender Erotica Awards =

US adult entertainment industry award

- Date: March 5, 2017
- Site: Avalon Hollywood, California
- Hosted by: Ts Madison

Highlights
- Best Film: Real Fucking Girls – Grooby / Mona Wales
- Most awards: Eddie Wood, Aubrey Kate and Miran (2 each)
- Most nominations: Eddie Wood and Korra Del Rio (6 each)

The 9th Annual Transgender Erotica Awards was a pornographic awards event recognizing the best in transgender pornography form the previous year from 15 November 2015 to 15 November 2016.

Pre-nominations opened from November 1 to November 20, 2016, and the public-at-large was able to suggest nominees using an online form. Nominees were announced on December 21, 2016, online on the theteashow.com website, with fan voting opening on the same day. The winners were announced during the awards on March 5, 2017. The awards open to fan voting were the fan award which was open to all and site-specific awards which were open to members of the forums of the specific sites who met specific criteria regarding; a number of postings and a date to have been a member before.

The format of the Awards was changed and formed the final part of a three-day event. A total of 400 people were reported by organisers to have attended the event.

== Winners and nominees ==
The nominations for the 8th Transgender Erotica Awards were announced online on December 21, 2016, and opened to fan voting on the same day, when pre-nominations closed, online on the theteashow.com website. The winners were announced during the awards on March 5, 2017.

=== Awards ===
Winners are listed first, highlighted in boldface.

Best New Face	Best Transman Model
**Chanel Santini**; Anastasia Coxx; Anya the Blushing Rocker; Aspen Brooks; Bailey Love; Beth Bell; Brooklyn Roberts; Carrie Emberlyn; Casey Kisses; Jenna Tales; Jenny Flowers; Kendall Dreams; Lena Kelly (Jade); Lianna Lawson; Mara Nova; Morena Black; Yuuki Trap	**Eddie Wood**; Buck Angel; Dicky Johnson; Israel Hammer; Johnny Deep; Peter Pinkpuss; T-Jay Starr; Tyler St. Syn; Zander Perry
Best Solo Model	Best Hardcore Model
**Kylie Maria**; Aubrey Kate; Brooke Zanell; Chanel Santini; Domino Presley; Foxxy; Holly Parker; Honey Foxxx; Isabella Sorrenti; Jonelle Brooks; Korra Del Rio; Lianna Lawson; Nadia Love; Natalie Mars; Natassia Dreams; Salina Salmone; Shiri; Sunshyne Monroe; Tyra Scott; Vixxen Goddess	**Aubrey Kate**; Alexa Scout; Casey Kisses; Chanel Santini; Chelsea Marie; Foxxy; Freya Wynn; Honey Foxxx; Jenna Tales; Jessy Dubai; Kelli Lox; Korra Del Rio; Kylie Marie; Mia Maffia; Morgan Bailey; Nina Lawless; Natalie Mars; Stefani Special; Trixxy Von Tease; Venus Lux
Best International Performer (East)	Best International Performer (West)
**Megumi**; Ayu Kamasaki; Enjoy (Ladyboy.XXX); Jasmine (LadyboyGold); Jazzi (LadyboyGold); Julia Winston; Miran; Raquel; Rinka Sanjo; Rin Shinonome; Sophie; Tyra Evans (Philippines); Yume Masuda	**Mia Maffia**; Adriana Rodrigues; Bárbara Perez; Dita Dior; Eva Paradis; Gia Itzel; Jelena; Jazmin (UK); Kate Violin; Lina Cavalli; Lily Queen; Nikki Montero; Red Vex; Sadie Kross
Best Scene	Best Transman Scene
**Aubrey Kate & Phoenix Marie & Will Havoc - Phoenix Marie's TS Threesome: What does she have that I don't have?** - TS Seduction; Alexa Scout & Robert Axel - Shemale.XXX / Blackula; Aubrey Kate & Jenna Tales & Christian - TS girlfriends fuck their submissive in Vegas: Pure TS / Damien Cain; Beth Bell & Mara Nova: tgirls.porn / Radius Dark; Brooke Zanell - Shemale Strokers: Sammy Mancini; Domino Presley & Robert Axel - Tranny Vice: Buddy Wood; Isabella Sorrenti and Korra Del Rio - Bang My Tranny Ass: Sammy Mancini; Jessy Dubai & Heather Vahn - Feisty TS Latine: Transsensual / Nica Noelle; Kelli Lox & Ella Nova - Real Fucking Girls: Mona Wales; Korra Del Rio Solo Scene - Shemale Strokers: Sammy Mancini; Korra Del Rio & Casey Kisses - Online Friends Meet To Fuck: twotgirls.com / Mayumi Sparkles; Kylie Maria and B.Nefarious - Shemale.XXX / Blackula; Lena Jade Taming Willy - Bobs-Tgirls / Bob Maverick; Lexus Bradbury Meets Jeff - UK Tgirls & Friends or uk-tgirls.com / Kalin; Lianna Lawson & Casey Kisses tgirls.porn / Radius Dark; Mia B and Soldier Boi: Black-Tgirls.com / Omar Wax; Megumi’s Explosive Return: shemale-japan-hardcore.com / Terry; Morgan Bailey & Mona Wales: Tranny Vice / Buddy Wood; Natalie Mars Stylish Sphincter Stretch: TS Playground 24 / Jay Sin; Natassia Dreams & Simone Sonay: Real Fucking Girls / Mona Wales; Tori Mayes & TS TarynXO: TS Factor 3 Joey Silvera; Venus Lux & Kendra Sinclar: TS Factor 5 Joey Silvera	**FTM Hunter: Michelle Austin & Eddie Wood** – TSMichelle.XXX; Michelle Austin & Johnny Deep – Trans Men Adventures 3: Casting Couch; Rough Housing: Dicky Johnson & Oyle – DickyJohnson.com; Threesome Fun: Eddie Wood, Michelle Austin, & Elia Allure – Michelle Austin: Trans Porn Star; Eating Out: Eddie Wood & Jessy Dubai – Return of the Squirting Man; Romance: Tyra Scott & Israel Hammer – FTM.XXX; The Sleepover: Eddie Wood, Trixxy Von Tease, & Honey Foxxx; Blown: Eddie Wood + Travis Foxxx – Blown (Buck Angel); Buck Angel & Valentina Nappi – Girl/Boy 2
Ms. Unique	Best DVD
**Mara Nova**; Anya the Blushing Rocker; Britney Boykins; Chelsea Marie; Chloe Wilcox; Isabella Sorrenti; Jaquie Blu; Jelena Vermilion; Kacy Tgirl; Kira Crash; Koko Beans; Krissy 4U; Lillith Lovett; Mara Nova; Mayumi Sparkles; Robin Thorn; Stefani Special; Treasure Barbie; Trixxy Von Tease; Wendy Summers	**Real Fucking Girls** – Grooby / Mona Wales; Bang My Tranny Ass 14 – Mancini Productions / Sammy Mancini; Deep Inside TS Foxxy – Transsensual / Nica Noelle; Domino Presley: Transsexual Icon – Grooby / Blackula & Buddy Wood; Girl/Boy 2 – Evil Angel / Dana Vespoli; Hot for Transsexuals # 2 – Evil Angel / Aiden Starr; Joanna Jet The Trans Milf 2 – Third World Media / Joanna Jet; Miran: Newhalf Superstar – Grooby / Blackula & Hiro; Rogue Adventures # 44 – Evil Angel / Joey Silvera; Shemale Shenanigans – Grooby / Buddy Wood; Shemale Strokers 81 – Mancini Productions / Sammy Mancini; Shemale Strokers 82 – Mancini Productions / Sammy Mancini; The Adventures of Sunshyne: The Body – SMC Productions; Trans-tastic 4 – Grooby / Blackula; Tranny Vice – Grooby / Buddy Wood; Transsexual Girlfriend Experience 1 – Devil's Films / Jim Powers; TS Factor 3 – Evil Angel / Joey Silvera; TS Girls in Charge – Trannsensual; TS Playground 24 – Evil Angel / Jay Sin; TS FemDom – Severe Sex Films / Dee Severe & Jimmy Broadway
Best Solo Website	Best Internet Personality
**JonelleBrooks.com**; DeliaTS.com; EvaParadis.com; HollyParker.xxx; TSJamieFrench.com; Krissy4u.com; KylieMaria.xxx; LinaCavalli.xxx; TSMaraNova.com; Mia-Isabella.com; MiaMaffia.xxx; TrixxyVonTease.xxx; TS-Jesse.xxx; TwoTGirls.com; Sunshyneland.com; Venus-Lux.com; WendySummers.com	**Miran**; Aubrey Kate; Bailey Jay; Becca Benz; Buck Angel; Domino Presley; Holly Parker; Honey Foxxx; Jacquie Blu; Jamie French; Jessica Fappit; Jiz Lee; Kelly Pierce; Kylie Maria; Liberty Harkness; Mia Maffia; Natalie Mars; Stefani Special; TS Madison; Venus Lux; Wendy Williams
Best Photographer	Best Scene Producer
**Bob Maverick**; Blackula; Damien Cain; Frank; Jack Flash; Josh Stone; Kalin; Krista Michaels; Kila Kali; Omar Wax; Radius Dark; Terry Grooby; Vito Soho	**Damien Cain**; Aiden Starr; Ames Beckerman; Amy Sex Kitten; Blackula; Buddy Wood; Dana Vespoli; Isabel Dresler; Jack Flash; Jamie French; Joey Silvera; Josh Stone; Madeline Marlowe; Michelle Austin; Mona Wales; Nica Noelle; Omar Wax; Radius Dark; Sammy Mancini
Best Non-TS Female Performer	Best Non-TS Male Performer
**Amarna Miller**; Arabelle Raphael; Ava Devine; Bella Rossi; Cherry Torn; Daisy Ducati; Ella Nova; Juliette Marsh; Lilith Luxe; Magdalene St. Michaels; Mona Wales; Oxcetalene Lane	**Alexander Gustavo**; Christian; Dorian Rake; Drake; Kai Bailey; Lance Hart; Lance Ryder; Rick Fantana; Rob Yeager; Ruckus; Soldier Boi; Will Havoc
Grooby Girl of the Year	Kinkiest Tgirl Domme
**Natalie Mars**	**Honey Foxxx**
Bobs TGirls Model of the Year	Shemale Strokers Model of the Year
**Miran**	**Korra Del Rio** and **Casey Kisses** [Tie]
Best Industry Professional	Transcendence Award
**Al Tom**	**Stefani Special**
Fan Choice Award	Lifetime Achievement Award
**Domino Presley**	**Wendy Williams**; **Natassia Dreams**
