= Lara Roxx =

Canadian actress (born 1982/1983)

- Roxx in 2007
- Born: 1982 or 1983 (age 43–44)
- Occupation: Pornographic film actress

Lara Roxx (born 1982 or 1983) is a Canadian former pornographic film actress who, in March 2004, became the first of three known individuals in four years to contract HIV while making a U.S. pornographic video.

== Career ==
A native of Montreal, Roxx became famous in 2004, after being exposed to HIV while doing a pornographic scene with Darren James. She reportedly contracted the virus just two months after doing her first scene, which involved unprotected double anal penetration. Roxx said that she relied on the industry's HIV standards to ensure her safety. Upon learning about James's HIV status, she said she realized that she had "trusted this system that wasn't to be trusted at all."

Roxx is the subject of the Canadian documentary film Inside Lara Roxx (2011), directed by Canadian filmmaker and photographer Mia Donovan, which explores Roxx's 2004 HIV infection and her life since the media coverage of this incident subsided.

== See also ==
- Adult Industry Medical Health Care Foundation
- Sexually transmitted infections in the pornography industry
