= Inside Lara Roxx =

- Theatrical release poster
- Directed by: Mia Donovan
- Written by: Mia Donovan
- Produced by: Mia Donovan; Mila Aung-Thwin; Daniel Cross
- Edited by: Omar Majeed
- Production company: EyeSteelFilm
- Release date: November 25, 2011 (Montreal)
- Running time: 81 minutes
- Country: Canada

Inside Lara Roxx is a 2011 EyeSteelFilm Canadian documentary film by Canadian film director Mia Donovan. It covers the circumstances of a 21-year-old Canadian woman Lara Roxx who in the Spring of 2004, left her hometown Montreal heading to Los Angeles to work in pornography. Within two months she contracted HIV after shooting an unprotected sex scene with two men. It was revealed that one of the two men, porn actor Darren James, was HIV positive. The film did well critically. In 2012, it was nominated for a Claude Jutra Award for Best Documentary.

== Synopsis ==
The film's director Mia Donovan documents Roxx's life in the 5-year period following her diagnosis. Donovan meets her in a psychiatric ward in Montreal suffering from bipolar disorder. The film covers Roxx's return to L.A. and Las Vegas to reconnect with the industry, her appearance on The Maury Povich Show, her attempt to establish a foundation for the protection of sex workers, and her crack addiction and entry into rehab.

The film has interviews with a number of Roxx's former associates – porn agents, porn actors and actresses like Bill Margold, Dick Nasty, Ron Jeremy and Anita Cannibal. The film also interviews the doctor who diagnosed her HIV, and her parents.

== Screenings and awards ==
The film had its world premiere at Hot Docs, Toronto's international documentary film festival under "Canadian Spectrum" section on 5, 6 and 8 May 2011.

The film placed second in the Bacchus Award for best feature at the Boston Underground Film Festival. It also won Documentary on Society and Humanity at the 2011 Guangzhou International Documentary Film Festival. In 2012 the film was nominated for a Claude Jutra Award for Best Documentary.

== See also ==
- Sexually transmitted infections in the pornography industry
