= Pink Cross =

Pink Cross may refer to:

- a U.S. anti-pornography group, see Pink Cross Foundation
- a Swiss LGBT umbrella organization, see LGBT rights in Switzerland
