= Mia Li =

American pornographic actress (born 1990)

- Born: May 28, 1990 (age 36); Queens, New York, U.S.
- Occupations: Pornographic actress; activist
- Years active: 2013–present
- Height: 5 ft 1 in (155 cm)

Mia Li (born May 28, 1990), also known professionally as Mia Little, is an American pornographic actress and activist. Having over 270 performance credits as an adult actress, Li has also been noted for her efforts to increase transparency about the adult industry, as well as being an activist for adult film stars.

== Early and personal life ==
Born to a conservative Filipino family from Queens, Li stated she never received sex education beyond being told not to have it.

Outside of adult films, Li is a fan of rock climbing, ukulele, and sharing content about food and the adult film industry on her personal YouTube.

== Career ==
Li began her career in the adult film industry in 2011.

She signed with Ikigai Marketing & PR in November 2017. In 2025, she was nominated in the 7th annual Pornhub Awards.

=== Activism ===
Li has previously served as the president of the Adult Performer Advocacy Committee. While in her role, commenting on the death of actress August Ames, Li spoke out about homophobia within the adult film industry and society at-large, the necessity for more openness and transparency about mental illness and drug addiction in the industry, and criticized the gig economy nature of the porn industry. She was openly opposed to California's Safer Sex in the Adult Film Industry Act.

Li has also hosted seminars at Claremont McKenna College discussing sex and BDSM, as well as a sex education seminar at a UCSD fraternity with Tasha Reign.
