= After Porn Ends =

- Directed by: Bryce Wagoner
- Release date: 21 May 2012
- Running time: 94 minutes
- Country: United States
- Language: English

After Porn Ends is a 2012 American documentary film about the pornography industry. It features interviews with Asia Carrera, Nina Hartley, Mary Carey, Randy West, Richard Pacheco, John Leslie, Amber Lynn, Seka, Raylene, Bill Margold, Shelley Lubben, Luke Ford and Tiffany Million.

== Background ==
Documentary filmmaker Bryce Wagoner, a graduate of East Carolina University, interviewed several former porn stars about their lives after leaving the industry. Wagoner got the inspiration for the documentary from a part-time job during his film education: During a voice-over and motion capture break for the video game, WWE SmackDown! vs. Raw, a group watched porn movies and one of them asked what the actors did with their lives after their time in the scene. In a separate blog post, he explained that the scene was about sexual acts with vegetables.

The questions in the fast-paced interview scenes revolve around four core questions: How do you find your way into this film business? Why do you stop and possibly start again? How can a secure existence or family be built and thus private life and career be separated? How do porn actors differ from other employees? Asia Carrera, among others, reports that Mensa International would link to all member websites, but in her case made an exception, since it is a pornographic website.

== Sequel ==
The first sequel, After Porn Ends 2, was released in March 2017. The industry actors involved included Janine Lindemulder, Ginger Lynn, Darren James, Lisa Ann, Chasey Lain, Tabitha Stevens, Brittany Andrews and Georgina Spelvin.

The second sequel, After Porn Ends 3, was released on 30 October 2018 and it continues to explore whether a career as an adult performer is inherently damaging to the balance of a performer's life once a performer retires from the porn industry. Directed by Brittany Andrews, it features Christy Canyon, Tera Patrick, Herschel Savage, Jenna Presley, Jenteal, Priya Rai and Bonnie Rotten.
