= Darren James =

American pornographic actor (born 1964)

- Born: Darren Keith Edwards; February 25, 1964 (age 61); Detroit, Michigan, U.S.
- Occupation: Pornographic actor
- Years active: 1997–2004 (as performer); 2004–2006 (as director)
- Known for: Transmission of HIV to 3 pornographic actresses during the shooting period
- Height: 5 ft 10 in (1.78 m)

Darren James (born Darren Keith Edwards; February 25, 1964) is an American former pornographic actor and director. He gained notoriety after he contracted HIV and infected three pornographic actresses in 2004.

== Discovery of infection and aftermath ==
In an attempt to prevent a possible outbreak, an urgent search was initiated for potentially infected performers. The search and subsequent testing were conducted by the Adult Industry Medical Health Care Foundation, where James had received his diagnosis. It was concluded that James had possibly been infected while engaging in unprotected anal sex with Brazilian actress Bianca Biaggi during a scene for the video Split That Booty 2 in Rio de Janeiro.

It was discovered that three actresses who had worked with James shortly after his return to the United States had also become infected: Canadian newcomer Lara Roxx, American Mariesa Arroyo, and Czech-born Jessica Dee. Roxx had entered the adult industry only two months before contracting the virus. Upon learning about the HIV outbreak, she has said, "It totally made me realize how I trusted this system that wasn't to be trusted at all, because it obviously doesn't work," and "I thought porn people were the cleanest people in the world."

Judy Star appeared in several movies Roxx also appeared in and was known to have performed a sex scene with a female actress who had performed a scene with James. Star, however, tested negative for HIV. The ensuing fears of HIV infection (as well as the public scandal and criticism of the industry that followed the outbreak) caused a temporary shutdown of production of adult movies in Southern California.

According to James, his diagnosis and the public disclosure thereof — which was how his family learned of his pornographic career — left him so distraught that he attempted suicide. After his recovery, he sued the Adult Industry Medical Health Care Foundation for publicly disclosing his condition. The lawsuit was settled out of court, with terms remaining confidential. James went on to find employment as a security guard. In 2005, the porn industry shutdown was the subject of the first episode of The Dark Side of Porn, a British documentary series produced for Channel 4.

James has remained very vocal about the incident and about adult filmmakers' continuing their habits "as usual". He is a staunch advocate of the mandatory use of condoms on porn sets to protect performers from HIV. Canadian documentary filmmaker Mia Donovan made a documentary film Inside Lara Roxx (2011), after following Roxx's life for five years, with candid interviews and documentation, in addition to footage from Darren James.

== Career ==
James appeared in 398 videos in his pornographic career. He also directed 8 pornographic films.

== See also ==
- Sexually transmitted infections in the pornography industry
- List of HIV-positive people
