= Tasha Reign =

American pornographic film actress (born 1988/1989)

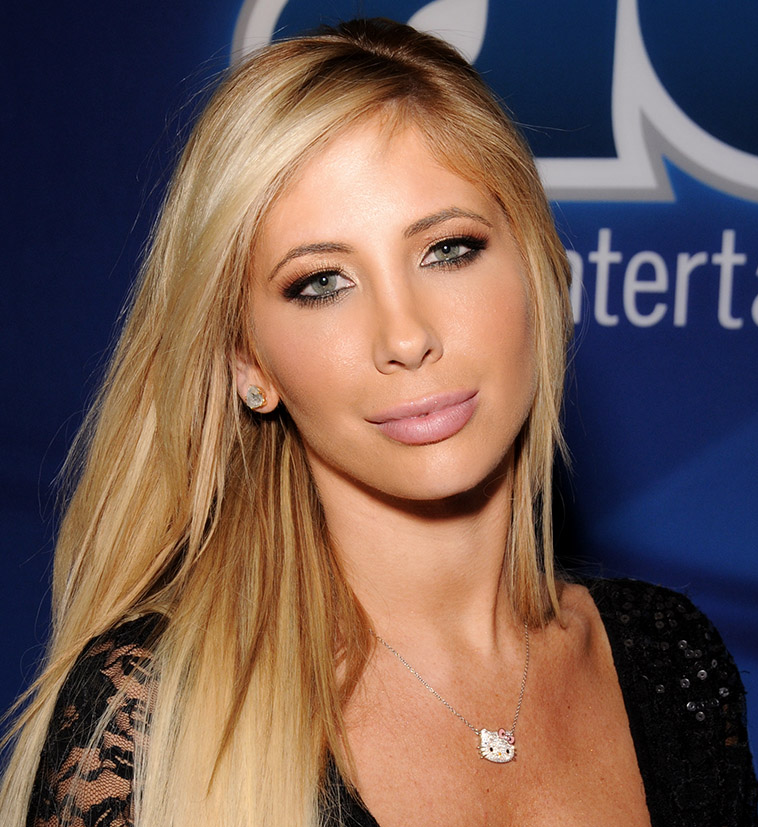
- Reign in 2014
- Born: Rachel Swimmer; 1988 or 1989 (age 37–38); Laguna Beach, California, U.S.
- Education: University of California, Los Angeles
- Occupations: Pornographic film actress; nude model; producer; sex columnist
- Website: tashareign.com

Rachel Swimmer (born January 15, 1989), known professionally as Tasha Reign, is an American pornographic film actress, nude model, producer, and sex columnist known for her appearances in Playboy and Penthouse magazine.

== Early life ==
Reign was born in Laguna Beach, California. In high school, she participated in the Model United Nations program and was cast in the third season of the MTV reality television series Laguna Beach: The Real Orange County.

Reign enrolled at Santa Monica College and in 2010 she transferred to UCLA. She graduated from UCLA with a degree in gender studies in 2014.

== Career ==
A former Hooters Girl, she began her career as a professional stripper in 2008, dancing at a club called the Silver Reign, from which she took her pseudonym.

=== Modeling ===
Reign appeared as a centerfold model in the April 2011 issue of Penthouse and the following month she was the Penthouse Pet of the Month. In February 2013 she appeared on the cover of OC Weekly. Additional magazines on whose covers Reign appeared include Club, Xtreme and Hot Vidéo.

=== Adult industry ===
Reign filmed her first adult movie in 2010 at the age of 21, a girl-girl scene for the production company Lethal Hardcore. Her adult movie highlights include filming superhero porn in Japan, starring in New Sensations' Anchorman: A XXX Parody, and appearing on the covers of many adult releases, including Zero Tolerance Entertainment's Kittens & Cougars 5 and Knockers Out, as well as Pleasure Dynasty's Zorro XXX: A Pleasure Dynasty Parody.

The 2012 XBIZ Awards enlisted Reign for the position of "Trophy Girl", along with fellow adult star Bibi Jones. Also in 2012, Reign launched her official membership site, www.TashaReign.com. Reign also appeared on the cover along with an interview and photo spread in France's Hot Video adult industry trade magazine and was their red carpet correspondent conducting interviews at the 28th annual XRCO Awards.

In order to create "fun, sex-positive adult content", Reign launched her own adult production studio in the fall of 2012 – Reign Productions, for which she also writes and directs most of her material. The studio's first DVD, Tasha Reign Is Sexy, was released on Halloween 2012. In July 2013, the studio signed a distribution deal with Girlfriends Films.

=== Writing ===
In March 2012, indie rock magazine and website Rock Confidential brought Reign on as a weekly music reviewer, dubbed "The World's Hottest Music Critic". Reign announced the position while a guest on musician Dave Navarro's radio show, Dark Matter, citing her background in music appreciation courses at UCLA.

In April 2013, the alternative paper OC Weekly announced Reign as its newest weekly columnist, penning "Tasha Tells All...". The first article was a commentary on Los Angeles County's Measure B.

In February 2014, she became an online columnist for The Huffington Post.

=== Advocacy ===
In a 2014 Huffington Post column, Reign wrote an open letter to Belle Knox, known as the "Duke porn star", to advocate for better societal treatment of sex workers. She said in her posting, "In an ideal world, you would be able to openly and fearlessly state your stage name, or even your birth name; however, it seems you are not as lucky as me to have gone to a school which celebrates your diversity and sexuality. [...] I want to apologize for all the ignorant, fearful comments your schoolmates at Duke are unloading on you. [...] Your peers have degraded you, misrepresented you, judged you, and made you feel unwelcome at an institution at which you seek a higher education."

Reign opposes unlicensed distribution of videos and sometimes personally searches the Internet for illegally posted clips or movies that feature her work. She was featured in an April 2014 broadcast of the ABC News Nightline story about copyright infringement in the adult industry.

In late 2016, she was active in advocacy opposing passage of California's "Proposition 60", which would have introduced a law requiring sex performers to use condoms in all sex scenes. The proposition did not pass.

Reign served as chairperson of the Adult Performer Advocacy Committee, an organized labor group. In early 2018, she told The Washington Post that she aimed for all pornography workers, including directors and producers, to receive training, and that the Me Too movement made her "more empowered" in speaking freely. She advocated regulation and resources relating to health—including mental health—consent, and harassment. Reign supported an increase in the minimum age for pornography performers in the United States from 18 to 21.

== Appearances ==
Reign is a recurring co-host for KXRN-LP in Laguna Beach.

In February 2014, Reign spoke on a panel with fellow actress Jessica Drake during the University of Chicago's Sex Week; they were featured on a panel entitled From Porn to Sex Ed.

Again in February 2014, Reign spoke along with Jessica Drake on a panel titled "Porn, Prostitution, and Censorship: The Politics of Empowerment" at Moore Hall at University of California at Los Angeles (UCLA). The annual panel is sponsored by the Social Awareness Network for Activism through Art (SANAA) in honor of Eve Ensler's V-Day organization. Reign and Drake were joined by Ph.D. candidate in Cinema and Media Studies at UCLA and lecturer at Otis College of Art and Design Jennifer Moorman, and UCLA Distinguished Lecturer Dr. Christopher Mott, who leads a seminar titled "Pornography and the Politics of Sexual Representation". During the panel, Reign was quoted as saying of the industry and its treatment of women, "As a performer, I have never felt objectified; I feel empowered and I've always looked at myself as a whole person and sexuality is only one of my characteristics. What people tend to forget is that women performers are the highest wage earners, so that's a complete reversal of Hollywood [...] Because women's bodies are objectified, they make a hell of a lot more money than the men do."

== Personal life ==
During a May 2012 holiday in Monaco with fellow adult star Brooklyn Lee, Reign encountered former United States President Bill Clinton. A photo of the adult stars and Clinton quickly went viral on the internet. After extensive media attention, Reign explained the photo with Clinton was her being a fan of him and not the other way around.
