= Sex Workers' Action Program =

Canadian sex worker advocacy group

Sex Workers' Action Program (SWAP) Hamilton is a sex worker-led advocacy group in Hamilton, Ontario led by Executive Director Jelena Vermilion.

Begun in 2018, SWAP established a physical communal space on Barton Street in May of 2020, where individuals could gather in a safe environment. The group offers community education on health and safety, including pre-exposure prophylaxis for HIV prevention. The organization actively engages in advocacy efforts, promoting the fair treatment of individuals in the sex industry. The group frequently sends representatives to participate in academic and community based conferences. SWAP also conducts workshops for businesses and organizations in Hamilton. SWAP is dedicated to supporting sex workers, addressing their diverse challenges through a combination of educational initiatives, promoting the decriminalization of sex work and direct actions. SWAP has also organized protests and vigils to bring attention to the violence, including police violence, facing sex workers. In July 2022, they helped raise CA$9,000 to support the victim of a beating and sexual assault on Barton Street East, in Hamilton.

SWAP has partnered with the Greater Hamilton Health Network (GHHN), an Ontario Health Team to provide support services to sex workers. SWAP is also one of a number of groups in the Canadian Alliance for Sex Work Law Reform, a group that works to challenge existing laws targeting sex workers in Canada.
