= Jelena Vermilion =

Canadian sex worker advocate

Jelena Vermilion is a Canadian sex work advocate and the executive director of Sex Worker Action Program (SWAP) in Hamilton, Ontario. Vermilion is outspoken as a transgender woman and sex worker. She is an author, archivist, public speaker, and pornographic film star.

== Career and activism ==
Vermilion served as co-chair of the Sex Worker Action Network (SWAN) in Waterloo, Ontario. As part of SWAN, she served as an expert witness in R v. Boodhoo, a case that challenged specific sex worker laws in Canada.

She also created the Sex Worker Media Library Archive in the Hamilton Public Library, an archive of books, zines, videos, podcasts, and news articles dedicated to sex worker history, activism, and culture.

Vermilion has served as a Hamilton delegate to the Industrial Workers of the World. She has appeared in the documentary Translating Beauty to discuss the relationship between beauty standards and sex work and the unique challenges transgender women face.

In 2020, Vermilion and Carol Leigh collaborated to reproduce her #TakeBackTheNight film with the sex work excerpts from December 1990 San Francisco's Take Back The Night March to address the violence and stigma surrounding sex work and the need for decriminalization.

In 2023, she published Working It: Sex Workers on the Work of Sex. She has also published a column Beyond Barriers in the transgender magazine Transformation.

Vermillion serves as the executive director of SWAP, a sex worker community organization that maintains a drop-in center, educational center, and community resource on Barton Street in Hamilton, Ontario.

A frequent public speaker at academic conferences and an outspoken representative for sex workers' rights, Vermilion educates the public on laws impacting sex workers in Canada and the U.S., the stigma and discrimination faced by transgender women, and how the needs of sex workers were ignored during the COVID pandemic.

== Accolades ==
In 2023, Vermilion was honored by the YWCA of Hamilton as a Woman of Distinction.

== Personal life ==
In September 2023, Vermilion was assaulted as she participated in a Take Back the Night March in Hamilton. The assault happened hours after she met with the city's emergency community services committee to discuss strategies to address gender-based violence.
