= Mia Donovan =

Canadian photographer and filmmaker

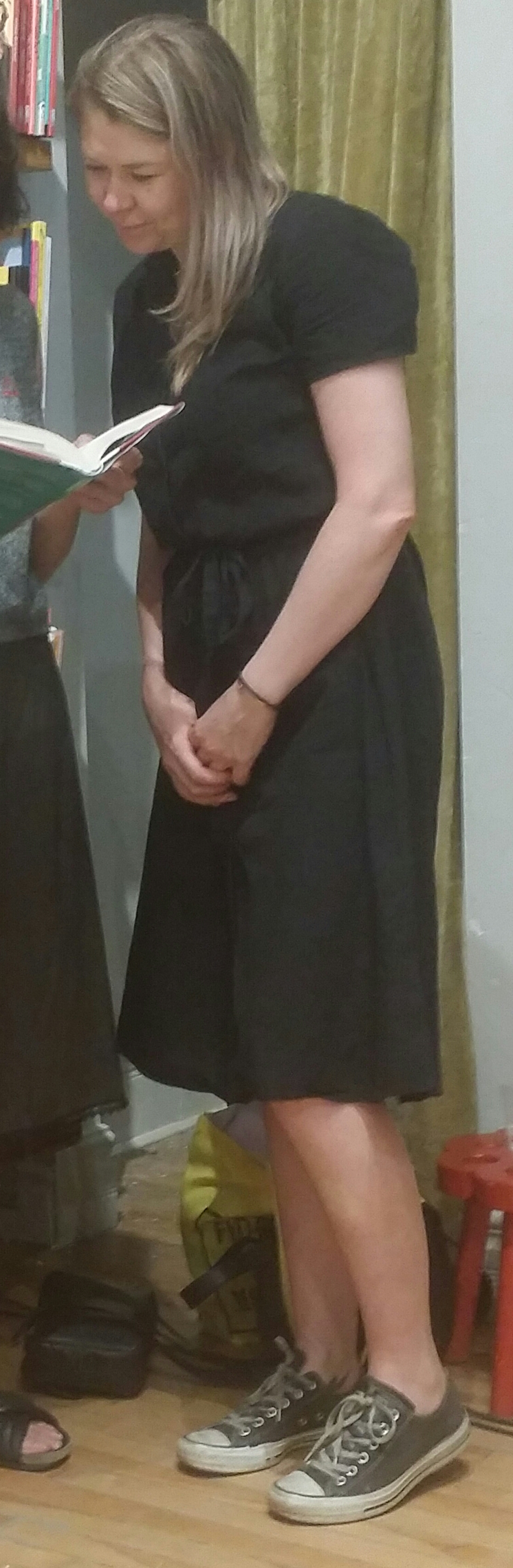
- Occupations: Photographer and filmmaker
- Notable work: Inside Lara Roxx

Mia Donovan is a Canadian photographer and filmmaker. She is best known for her documentary Inside Lara Roxx released through EyeSteelFilm about 21-year-old Canadian Lara Roxx who in the spring of 2004, left her hometown Montreal heading to Los Angeles for working in pornography and within two months contracted HIV after shooting an unprotected sex scene with two males. Donovan followed Lara Roxx through 5 years of Roxx's attempt to build a new identity and find hope in the wake of her past. Her film won "Best Documentary on Society and Humanity" at the 2011 Guangzhou International Documentary Film Festival and it was runner-up for "Best Feature at 2012 Boston Underground Film Festival.

In 2012, she was named the winner of the Don Haig Award at the Hot Docs Canadian International Documentary Festival.

Donovan received a B.F.A in Art History and Studio Arts from Concordia University in 2001.

Her photographic series 'Stripped' was shown in Montreal in January 2005. The series was an artistic reflection of commodification in the sex industry. She was picked as one of the "Noize Makers 2001" by Montreal arts weekly Montreal Mirror.

As of December 2012, she was in production of her second documentary about deprogrammer Ted Patrick with EyeSteelFilm.

== Filmography ==
- 2011: Inside Lara Roxx (director, co-producer, writer)
- 2015: 'Deprogrammed'
- 2020: Dope Is Death
