= Adult Industry Medical Health Care Foundation =

American nonprofit organization

- Abbreviation: AIM
- Formation: 1998; 28 years ago
- Founders: Sharon Mitchell
- Dissolved: 2011; 15 years ago
- Location(s): San Fernando Valley, Sherman Oaks, and Granada Hills, California
- Services: STD testing of pornographic performers for HIV and other STDs on a scheduled basis
- Website: www.aim-med.org

The Adult Industry Medical Associates P.C. (formerly Adult Industry Medical Healthcare Foundation), also known simply as AIM or AIM Medical, was a non-profit organization devoted to STD testing of pornographic performers for HIV and other STDs on a scheduled basis. Founded in 1998 by former pornographic film actress Sharon Mitchell, AIM went out of business in 2011 after licensing issues, and a data breach and lawsuit regarding the violation of patient privacy.

== History ==
Since the 1980s, outbreaks of HIV/AIDS within the community of erotic actors caused a number of deaths. In response to this threat AIM was founded in 1998 by former pornographic film actress, Sharon Mitchell, who had left the industry in 1996 to pursue credentials in public health counseling and sexology.

The Foundation helped set up a system in the United States wherein erotic actors in the adult film industry are tested for AIDS every 30 days. All on-camera sexual contact is logged, and a positive test result triggers the contacting and re-testing of all sexual partners during the previous three to six months. The Foundation provided secure means of sharing results via their web servers so that results cannot be forged. Prior to AIM, there had been STD testing programs in lifestyle communities, including Kerista Commune, More University, and Rajneeshpuram. These approaches had mixed results and were less systematic and regular.

Tests for the sex industry actors were done at the Foundation's offices in San Fernando Valley, Sherman Oaks, and Granada Hills. Each month, about 1,200 actors were tested for HIV, with results as early as 14 days after infection. This test is effective 10 days after potential infection, and anytime thereafter (HIV-1 DNA, by PCR) as compared to the alternative HIV test (HIV ELISA) which requires a six-month waiting period to be effective. The center also tested for chlamydia, gonorrhea and syphilis.

It was in 2004 that AIM assisted in the sex-film-industry shutdown, a quarantine that lasted fewer than 60 days. A male performer, Darren James, had tested positive for HIV in April and, to prevent another HIV outbreak, an urgent search was initiated for his potentially infected partners. A total of four more performers, Bianca Biaggi, Jessica Dee, Lara Roxx, and Miss Arroyo were diagnosed with the virus by the end of the testing rounds, including one unrelated case in New York. James had apparently had contact with 12 women since his initial negative HIV test in March upon his return from a Brazilian film shoot.

In 2009, the Los Angeles County Department of Public Health and the Los Angeles Times claimed there were 16 unreported cases of HIV among adult film actors. AIM Health Care Foundation reported that these cases were actually members of the general public or people applying to work in the adult film industry that had not yet actually worked in films due to their initial test being positive.

On October 12, 2010, the Foundation reported that an actor or actress had been infected with HIV. The name and gender of the person was not released to the public. Vivid Entertainment and Wicked Pictures shut down porn production temporarily to avoid spreading of the virus. Although Wicked Pictures has a mandatory condom policy, the company shut down to wait for the quarantine list.

In early 2011, the AIDS Healthcare Foundation publicly raised questions about AIM clinics' licensing situation, resulting in a shutdown. Later that year, the foundation reopened under private ownership, but this was short-lived.

== SxCheck ==
In 2006, AIM started offering online services for selecting, scheduling, and paying for tests in affiliation with local clinics and laboratories in many cities via SxCheck (alternatively AIM Check). With secure online access to test results, faking of paper test results was prevented, and workers could select to privately share the results with others online, by email, or by SMS.

== Patient database breach ==
AIM Medical's patient database was the source of a massive 2011 data leak containing confidential personal information, including the real names of over 12,000 pornographic actors and their STD test results, which was distributed via the Porn Wikileaks website AIM closed its offices and filed for bankruptcy in May 2011 as a result of a privacy lawsuit challenging AIM's handling of the patient records. Oversight of the testing protocol was later assumed by the Free Speech Coalition.

== See also ==
- Free Speech Coalition § Performer Availability Screening Services
- Sexually transmitted infections in the pornography industry
