= 2016 California Proposition 60 =

Proposition 60
- Adult Film Condom Requirements

Results
Choice	Votes	%
Yes	6,168,388	46.33%
No	7,146,039	53.67%
Valid votes	13,314,427	91.13%
Invalid or blank votes	1,296,082	8.87%
Total votes	14,610,509	100.00%
Registered voters/turnout	19,411,771	75.27%
County results
Yes
60–70%
50–60%
No
60–70%
50–60%

Proposition 60 was a California ballot proposition on the November 8, 2016, ballot which would have allowed the California Occupational Safety and Health Administration (Cal/OSHA) to prosecute an enforcement action anytime a condom is not visible in a pornographic film. The proposition failed to pass. Proposition 60 would have allowed any California resident to sue a pornographer and obtain their personal information. Frivolous lawsuits and actor safety were a major concern, as well as millions of taxpayer dollars it would cost to enforce. Enforcement of Proposition 60 was predicted to cost more than $1 million annually. State and local governments were predicted to lose tens of millions of dollars in tax revenue per year if the industry left the state.

If the state decided not to defend Proposition 60's constitutionality in court, the measure would have empowered its sole sponsor, Michael Weinstein of the AIDS Healthcare Foundation, to defend the measure himself. Weinstein's legal expenses would have been paid by the state and he could only be removed by a majority vote of both houses of the California State Legislature. These provisions were included in response to the United States Supreme Court ruling in Hollingsworth v. Perry that only state employees have standing to defend state ballot propositions in federal court.

Proposition 60 was similar to Measure B, passed by Los Angeles voters in 2012, which resulted in a large drop in permit filings for pornography shoots. Proposition 60 would have required adult film performers to use condoms during filming of sexual intercourse, and required producers to pay for performer vaccinations, testing, and medical examinations, and to post the condom requirement at film sites. Additionally, producers would have been required to renew their adult film licenses every two years as well as contact Cal/OSHA if and when a film was being made.

The statewide California pornography industry employs 2,000 people. Pornography in California is estimated to be a $9 billion industry. California law already requires all workers to use protection against infectious bodily fluids, and the California Occupational Safety and Health Administration has already interpreted the statute to require porn actors to wear condoms. In early 2016 rulemaking, Cal/OSHA drafted detailed regulation requiring condom use but it was withdrawn after widespread industry criticism.

Proponents spent $4.6 million fighting for the measure, all of it from the AIDS Healthcare Foundation. Opponents spent $433,614, with the top donor being Wicked Pictures. Other top donors included Cybernet Entertainment and the California Democratic Party. The editorial boards of the Los Angeles Times, the San Francisco Chronicle, and the Sacramento Bee opposed the measure. The proposition failed, with nearly 54% against and 46% in favor.
