= Shelley Lubben =

Author, singer, motivational speaker, and former pornographic actress

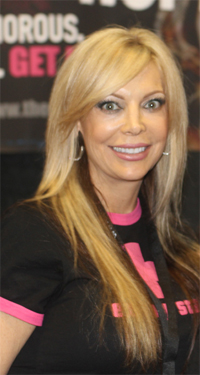
- Shelley Lubben in 2011
- Born: May 18, 1968; Pasadena, California, U.S.
- Died: February 9, 2019 (aged 50); Springville, California, U.S.
- Other names: Roxy; Shelley Lynn Moore
- Occupation: Nonprofit Executive Director
- Known for: Former pornographic actress turned anti-pornography activist
- Children: 3
- Website: ShelleyLubben.com

Shelley Lubben (May 18, 1968 – February 9, 2019) was an American author, singer, motivational speaker, and pornographic actress. As a performer in the adult film industry, she was known professionally as Roxy. After she left the sex industry, Lubben became a born-again Christian and anti-pornography activist. From 2008 to 2016, she was the executive director of Pink Cross Foundation, which reached out to women and men in pornography and spoke in public forums about the hazardous working conditions that she experienced in the porn industry. In January 2016, Lubben closed Pink Cross Foundation.

Lubben was also an ordained chaplain with the Order of Saint Martin with a degree in theological studies.

== Early life ==
Lubben was born on May 18, 1968, in Pasadena, California. In an interview with Howard Stern and Deseret News, Lubben stated that when she was nine years old, a female classmate and her teenage brother sexually abused her in a swimming pool. Lubben worked as a prostitute from age 18 to 26. During this time, she became pregnant by one of her customers, and later gave birth to a daughter.

== Career ==
=== Adult industry ===
Lubben entered the adult film industry, while working as a prostitute, when she was 24 years old. During her time in the sex industry, she contracted herpes and HPV, which led to cervical cancer, and resulted in the removal of half her cervix. During and after her life in the sex industry, she battled alcohol and drug addictions. During her pornographic career, which lasted from 1993 to 1994, Lubben appeared in about 15 hardcore movies. Lubben stated that the sex acts that women perform on film sets are physically harmful (including anal and uterine hemorrhaging), and psychologically traumatizing.

=== Advocacy ===
Pink Cross Foundation
- Formation: 24 January 2007
- Founder: Shelley Lubben
- Dissolved: January 24, 2016; 10 years ago
- Type: Incorporated 501(c)(3)
- Purpose: Emotional, financial and transitional support for adult industry workers; Education and resources to victims of sex trafficking and violence in the workplace; Support for those struggling with pornography addiction
- Location: Bakersfield, CA
- Region served: United States
- Services: Advocacy for adult industry performers
- Website: ThePinkCross.org

In 2005, Lubben initiated an aggressive online marketing campaign, utilizing social networking web sites in order to reach out to the sex industry. In 2008, Lubben established a faith-based organization called Pink Cross Foundation. The group concentrated on outreach to and evangelism of those in the porn industry, especially performers, and offers support to those wishing to leave the industry. The organization solicited donations online and offered an online support forum for individuals that are addicted to drugs, sex, and pornography. When Lubben identified interested individuals, she sent care packages filled with religious literature, bibles, Christian music, local grocery and department store gift cards, and other spiritual and practical supports. A secondary focus of Pink Cross was outreach to individuals seeking recovery from pornography addiction. Pink Cross attended pornography conventions to educate fans about how porn is not glamorous and also reaching out to porn stars and reminding them that they have options.

Pink Cross Foundation also lobbied against pornography and the adult entertainment industry. Lubben supported California legislator Charles Calderon in his effort to tax the pornographic industry by speaking to lawmakers about her experiences. Lubben indicated that the scenes on the set of a hardcore porn film often involve a woman and several men who are doing degrading acts to the woman. Lubben described the scene of a hardcore porn film as devoid of intimacy, and described it as "all mechanical and beastly". She further wrote that "women are vomiting off the set, and most of the actors are doing drugs and alcohol." In June 2010, she spoke to U.S. House and Senate members and their staffs in Washington, D.C., about the damage that was done to her body from her time in the porn industry. Moreover Lubben was outspoken regarding the illegal and hazardous working conditions in the industry, with sexually transmitted diseases being a workplace safety issue and public health concern.

As of 2012, Lubben was presenting her personal experiences in the adult film industry in public forums and speaking out about her recovery process and the emotional, mental, and physical effects of pornography on performers. In February 2011, she spoke at Cambridge University, where she presented on the harmful effects of pornography and debated the issue with advocates speaking on behalf of the pornography industry.

In January 2013, Swiss recording artist and model Patrick Nuo publicly claimed that Lubben helped him deal with his pornography addiction.

In January 2016, Lubben shut down Pink Cross Foundation.

=== Media appearances ===
Shelley Lubben

YouTube information
- Channel: Shelley Lubben
- Years active: 2006-present
- Subscribers: 55.4 thousand
- Views: 23.3 million
- Last updated: August 4, 2026

Lubben appeared in various international media outlets, including radio, television, and film. An overview of her life has been featured in the documentaries Traffic Control and Out of the Darkness, the latter of which was selected to be the opening film for the John Paul II Film Festival in 2011.

Lubben was also in the 2012 documentary After Porn Ends, which is about life after being in the porn industry. In February 2011, she became the subject of a documentary entitled, The Devil and Shelley Lubben, created by porn industry advocate Michael Whiteacre. According to Mark Kernes of the adult industry trade journal AVN, the film disputes Lubben's experiences in pornography and the trauma she says can be traced to those experiences. In June 2012, Lubben shared her life story in Slovakia to local media outlets.

=== Recording background ===
In January 2011, Lubben released a rap/hip hop album with the proceeds going to Pink Cross Foundation to help women and men recover from porn. The first single, titled "Killer Fantasy", features the message of a porn star speaking to the porn fan about the truth behind the adult industry.

== Death ==
Lubben died on February 9, 2019, in Springville, California, at the age of 50. No cause was given.

== Published work ==
- Lubben, Shelley. Truth Behind the Fantasy of Porn: The Greatest Illusion on Earth, CreateSpace, 2010. ISBN 978-1-4538-6007-6

== See also ==
- Anti-pornography movement
- Crissy Moran, another former pornographic actress who advocates against the adult industry
- Brittni De La Mora, another former pornographic film actress, now a minister at Cornerstone Church
