= Pornographic film actor =

Person who performs in pornography

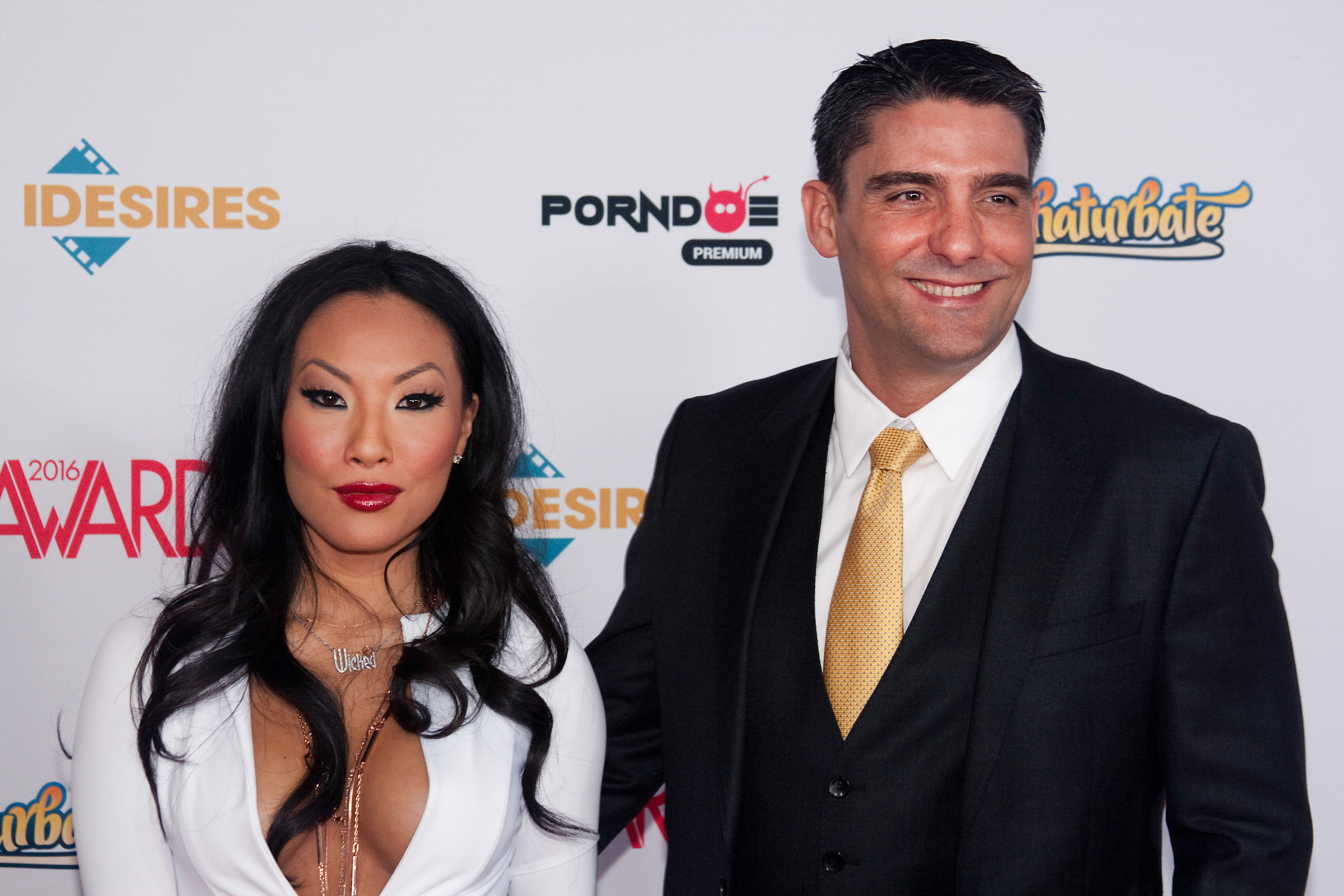
- Porn actors Asa Akira and Toni Ribas in 2016

Occupation
- Names: Pornographic film actor/actress, pornographic performer, adult entertainer, porn star
- Occupation type: Performing arts
- Activity sectors: Entertainment, sex industry

Description
- Fields of employment: Film, photography
- Related jobs: Actor, sex worker, webcam model

A pornographic film actor or actress, pornographic performer, adult entertainer, or porn star is a person who performs sexual activity on video that is usually characterized as a pornographic film. Such videos tend to be made in a number of distinct pornographic subgenres and attempt to present a sexual fantasy. The actors selected for a particular role are primarily selected on their ability to create or fit that fantasy. Pornographic videos are characterized as either softcore, which does not contain depictions of sexual penetration or extreme fetishism, and hardcore, which can contain depictions of penetration or extreme fetishism, or both. The genres and sexual intensity of videos is mainly determined by demand. Depending on the genre of the film, the on-screen appearance, age, and physical features of the actors and their ability to create the sexual mood of the video is of critical importance. Most actors specialize in certain genres, such as straight, bisexual, gay, lesbian, bondage, strap-on, anal, double penetration, semen swallowing, orgy, gang bang, age roleplay, fauxcest, interracial, teenage (18-19) or MILFs and more.

Most performers use a pseudonym and strive to maintain off-screen anonymity. A number of pornographic film actors and actresses have written autobiographies. It is very rare for pornographic film actors and actresses to successfully cross over to the mainstream film industry. Certain pornographic film actors have leveraged their success to branch into different entrepreneurial endeavours, such as Jenna Jameson's ClubJenna.

Leaked patient database of Adult Industry Medical Health Care Foundation in 2011 contained details of over 12,000 pornographic film actors that it had tested since 1998, providing estimates of the number of pornographic film actors who have worked in the United States. As of 2011, it was reported that roughly 1,200–1,500 performers were working in California's "Porn Valley".

== History ==
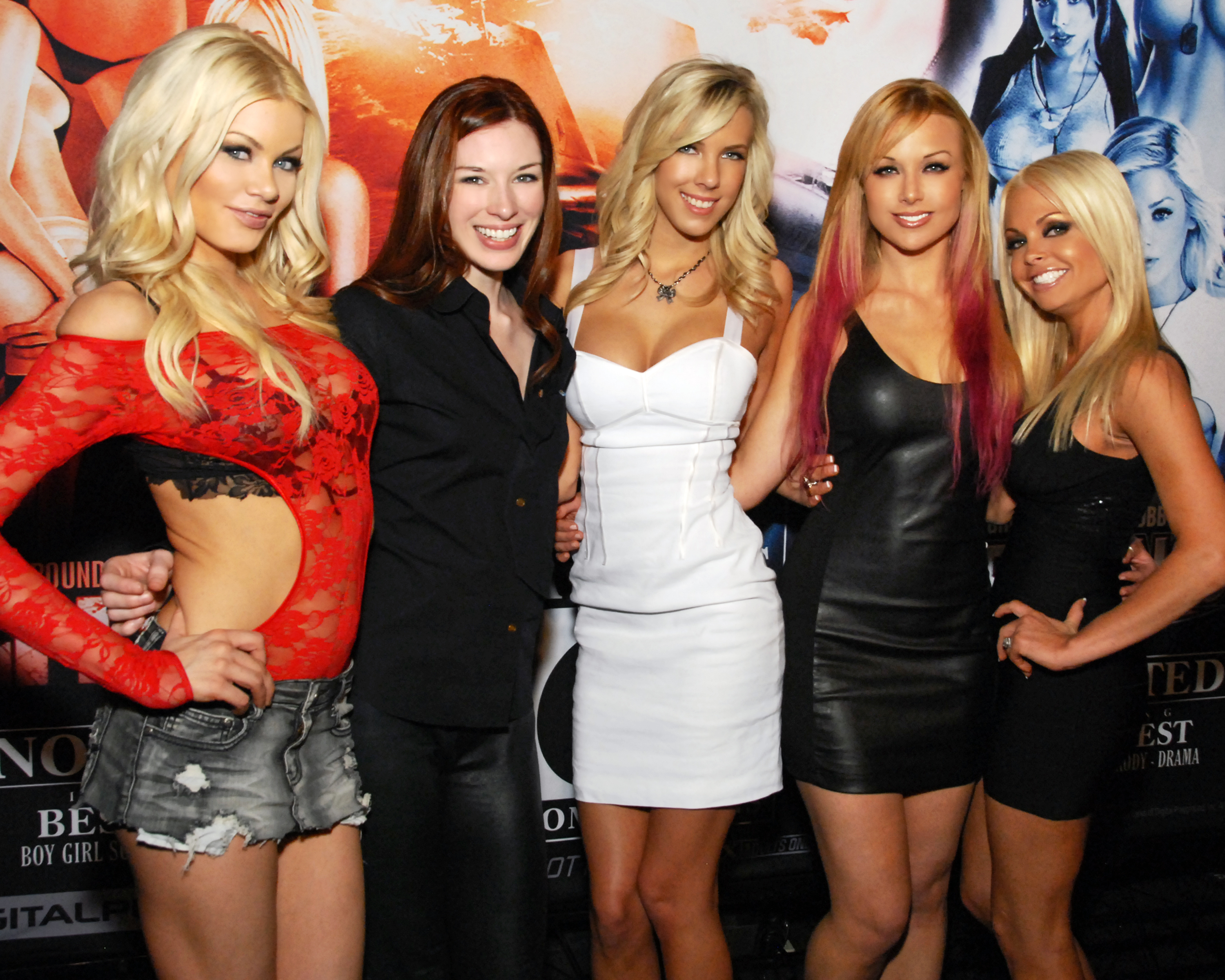
Digital Playground adult film actresses: Riley Steele, Stoya, BiBi Jones, Kayden Kross, and Jesse Jane, at the AVN Expo, Las Vegas, Nevada on January 18, 2012

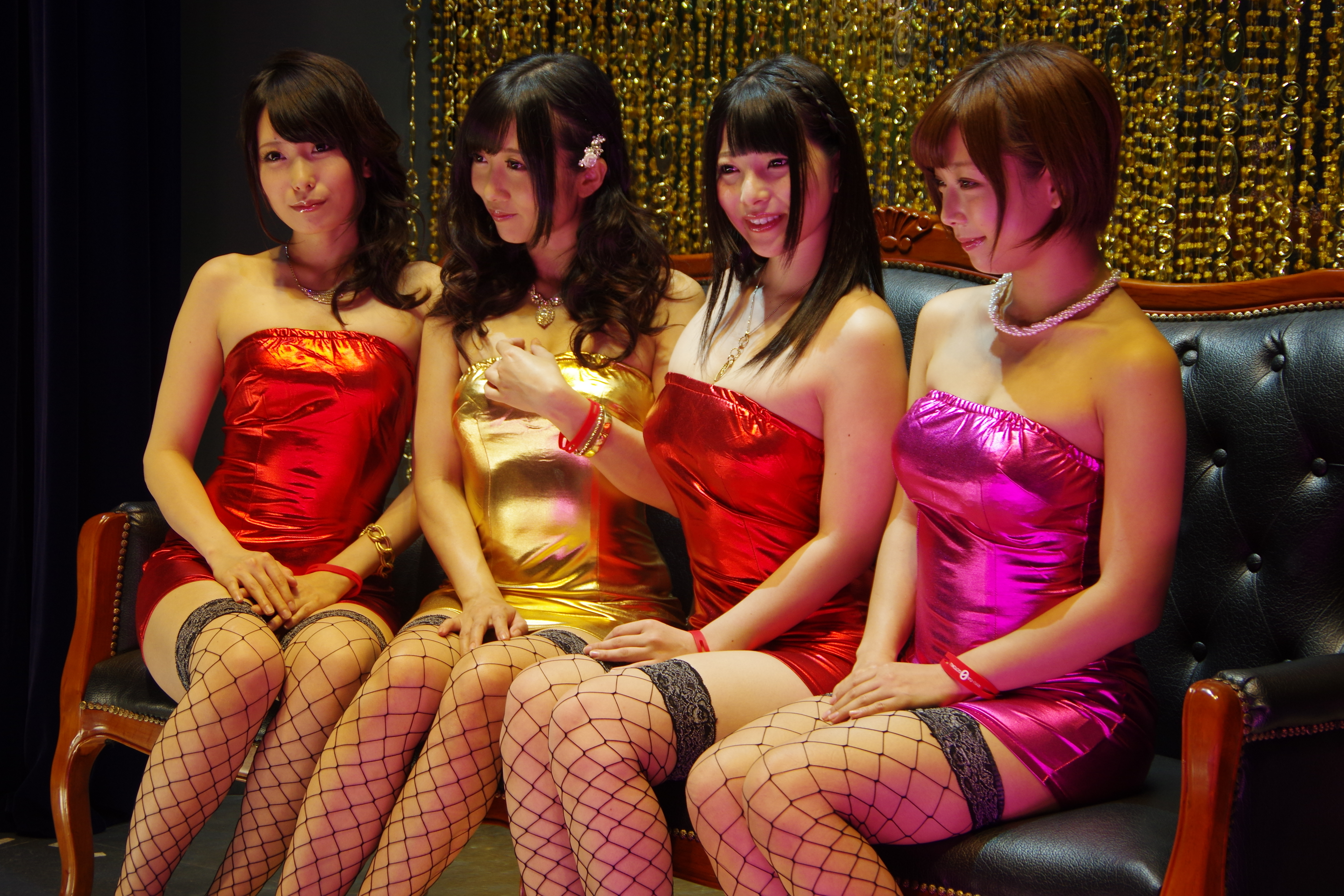
From Left-Right: Chika Arimura, Hibiki Ōtsuki, Ai Uehara and Mana Sakura, are Japanese pornographic film actresses popular in Japan and recipient of numerous awards for her filmography at Tokyo Game Show 2014

Production of risqué films commenced with the start of photography. "Moving pictures" that featured nudity were popular in "penny arcades" of the early 1900s which had hand-cranked films and stereoscope glasses, as well as vitascope theaters. These attractions featured topless women, full frontal nudity, and sexual coupling.

Production of erotic films commenced almost immediately after the invention of the motion picture. The first erotic film was the seven-minute 1896 film Le Coucher de la Mariée directed by Frenchman Albert Kirchner (under the name "Léar"), which had Louise Willy performing a bathroom striptease. Other French filmmakers also started making this type of risqué films, showing women disrobing. The Pathé brothers supplied the demand throughout Europe. In Austria, Johann Schwarzer produced 52 erotic productions between 1906 and 1911, each of which contained young local women fully nude, to provide an alternative local source to the French productions.

Performers in these early productions were usually uncredited or used pseudonyms to avoid legal sanction and social disapprobation. The use of pseudonyms was the norm in the industry; pornographic film actors maintained a low profile, using pseudonyms to maintain a level of anonymity, while others performed uncredited. The use of pseudonyms has remained a tradition in the industry, and actors would perform under a number of pseudonyms, depending on the genre of film, or change a pseudonym when the previous one ceased to be a draw card.

Casey Donovan starred in the first mainstream pornographic hit, Boys in the Sand, in 1971. However, arguably the first pornstar to become a household name was Linda Lovelace (the pseudonym of Linda Susan Boreman) from New York City, United States, who starred in the 1972 feature Deep Throat. The film grossed millions of dollars worldwide, a success that was echoed by similar stars and productions such as Marilyn Chambers (Behind the Green Door (1972)), Gloria Leonard (The Opening of Misty Beethoven (1976)), Georgina Spelvin (The Devil in Miss Jones (1973)), and Bambi Woods (Debbie Does Dallas (1978)).

The period from the early 1970s through the late 1970s or early 1980s has been called the Golden Age of Porn, when erotic films were produced in the United States with narratives, backed by movie-style promotional budgets, and were shown in public theaters and accepted (or at least tolerated) for public consumption. Performers in these productions became celebrities including Peter Berlin, John Holmes, Ginger Lynn Allen, Porsche Lynn, Desireé Cousteau, Juliet Anderson (Aunt Peg), Lisa De Leeuw, Veronica Hart, Nina Hartley, Harry Reems, Seka, Annette Haven and Amber Lynn. Meanwhile, in Europe, many pornographic film actresses and actors come from the so-called pornographic bloc countries, such as Russia, Romania, Czech Republic, Slovakia and Hungary. In France, popular female performers have included Brigitte Lahaie, Clara Morgane, Céline Tran (Katsuni), and Yasmine Lafitte. In Italy, the Swedish Marina Lothar rose to prominence in the early 1980s, as well as Moana Pozzi, Ilona Staller (Cicciolina), and Lilli Carati.

== Performers ==
=== Female performers ===
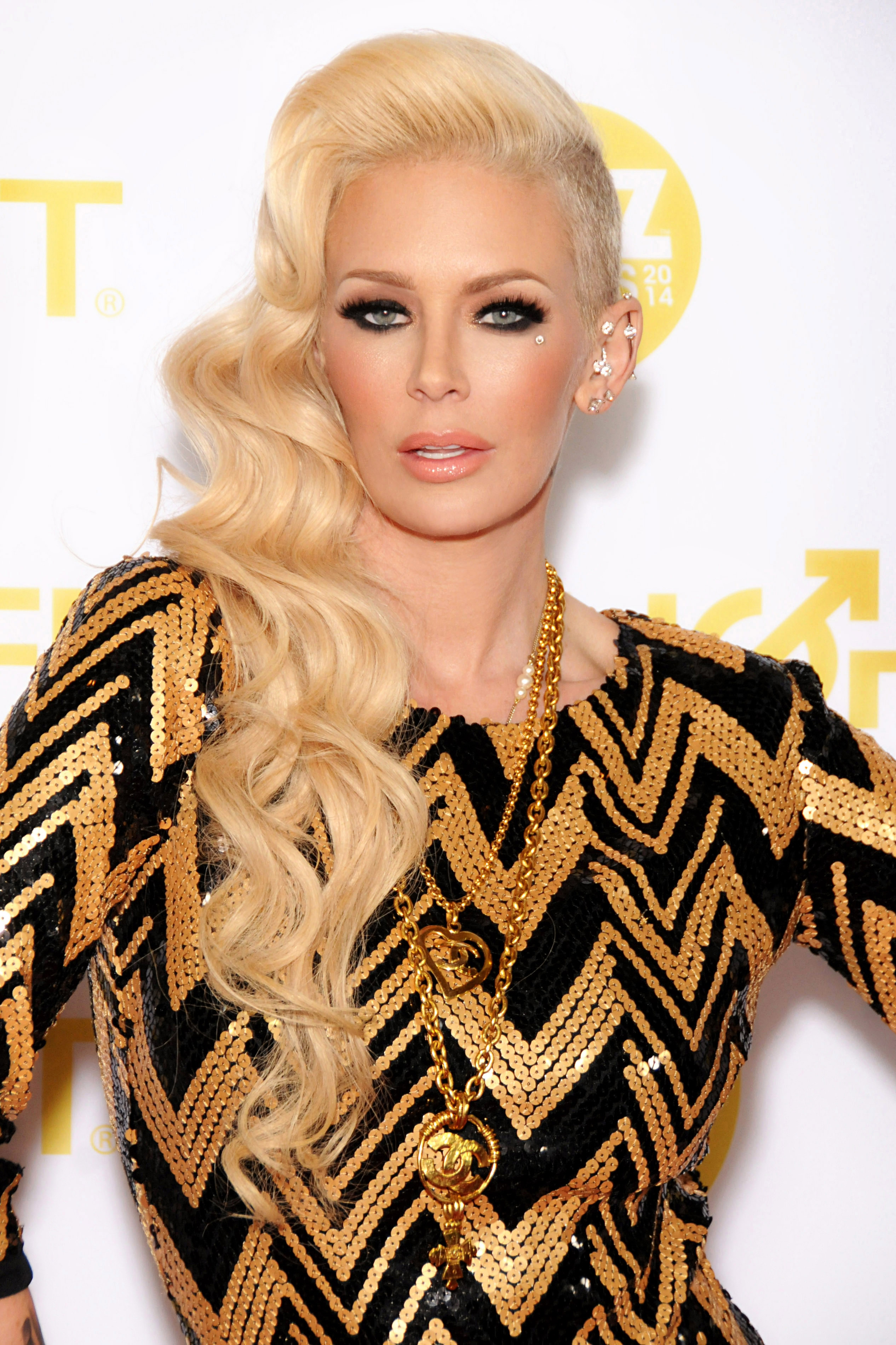
American businesswoman and former pornographic film actress Jenna Jameson has been named the world's most famous adult entertainment performer.

The on-screen physical appearances of the female performers is of primary importance. They are typically younger in age than their male counterparts, in their teens, 20s, and 30s. As most pornografic content is produced for and by cisgender, heterosexual white men, there is a preference in the industry for thinness and white actresses with large breasts. Some film studios encourage their actresses to have breast implants, and offer to pay for the procedure. Regarding body types, there is much more diversity among female webcam performers who are mostly not bound to a film studio.

According to actor-turned-director Jonathan Morgan:

The girls could be graded like A, B and C. The A is the chick on the boxcover. She has the power. So she'll show up late or not at all. 99.9% of them do that.

Less desirable actresses are more likely to agree to perform more extreme and high-risk sexual acts such as "double-anal" in order to get work. According to Morgan:

Some girls are used up in nine months or a year. An 18-year-old, sweet young thing, signs with an agency, makes five films in her first week. Five directors, five actors, five times five: she gets phone calls. A hundred movies in four months. She's not a fresh face any more. Her price slips and she stops getting phone calls. Then it's, 'Okay, will you do anal? Will you do gangbangs?' Then they're used up. They can't even get a phone call. The market forces of this industry use them up.

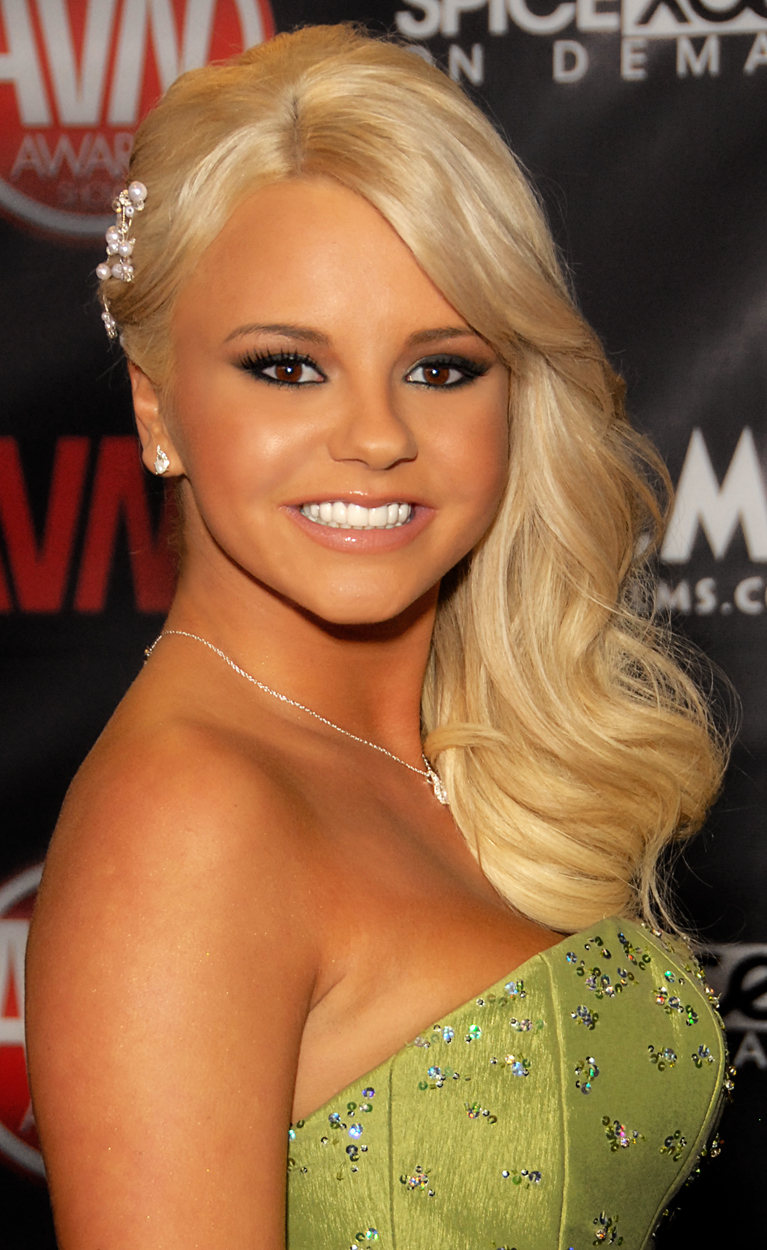
American model and former pornographic film actress Bree Olson. She performed in over 170 adult films from 2006 to 2011.

Some performers note that "a performer's pleasure is not of primary importance" and that "porn sex is not the same as private sex".

According to a study investigating health risks for industry performers, female performers experience significantly higher risk within their job role than male performers. The study reported:

Performers engaged in risky health behaviors that included high-risk sexual acts that are unprotected, substance abuse, and body enhancement. They are exposed to physical trauma on the film set. Many entered and left the industry with financial insecurity and suffered from mental health problems. Women were more likely than men to be exposed to health risks. Adult film performers, especially women, are exposed to health risks that accumulate over time and that are not limited to sexually transmitted diseases.

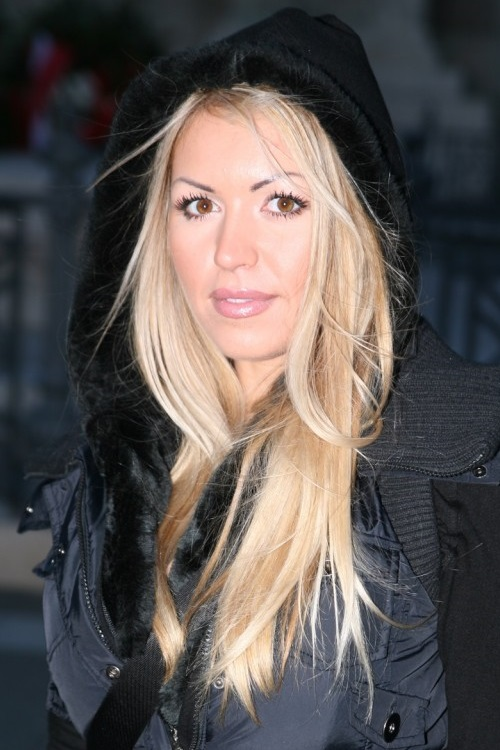
Hungarian call girl and former pornographic film actress Anette Dawn was one of the most prominent European adult film performers of the 2000s.

Furthermore, there is a contrary opinion stating that porn production is not necessarily unethical or degrading. According to Lynn Comella, a women's studies professor at UNLV, presenting demeaning practices as representative of the entire porn industry is "akin to talking about Hollywood while only referencing Spaghetti Westerns".

A 2012 study titled, "Why Become a Pornography Actress?" analyzed female performers in pornography, and their reasons for choosing the occupation; it found that the primary reasons were money (53%), sex (27%), and attention (16%). Respondents also stated the aspects of their work which they disliked. These included industry-associated people, e.g., co-workers, directors, producers, and agents, whose "attitudes, behaviors, and poor hygiene [were] difficult to handle within their work environment" or who were unscrupulous and unprofessional (39%); STIs risk (29%); and exploitation within the industry (20%).

According to a 2013 study in the Journal of Sex Research, female porn performers were reported to have engaged in sexual activity at a younger age, utilized several drugs, identified as bisexual, had more sexual partners, and had better enjoyment of sex compared to their non-porn peers. They were also found to have a good quality of life, social support systems, sexual fulfillment, spirituality, and equal or better levels of self-esteem compared to their non-porn counterparts.

A 2018 review published in the Journal of Sex Research found in a survey that the majority of male pornography consumers disliked seeing "acts that were more clearly unpleasant/painful for female performers, such as forced gagging or forceful anal penetration." The study concluded that despite the oversaturation of extreme and kinky content in the industry, most consumers are not interested in kinky, fetish or degrading pornography.

=== Male performers ===
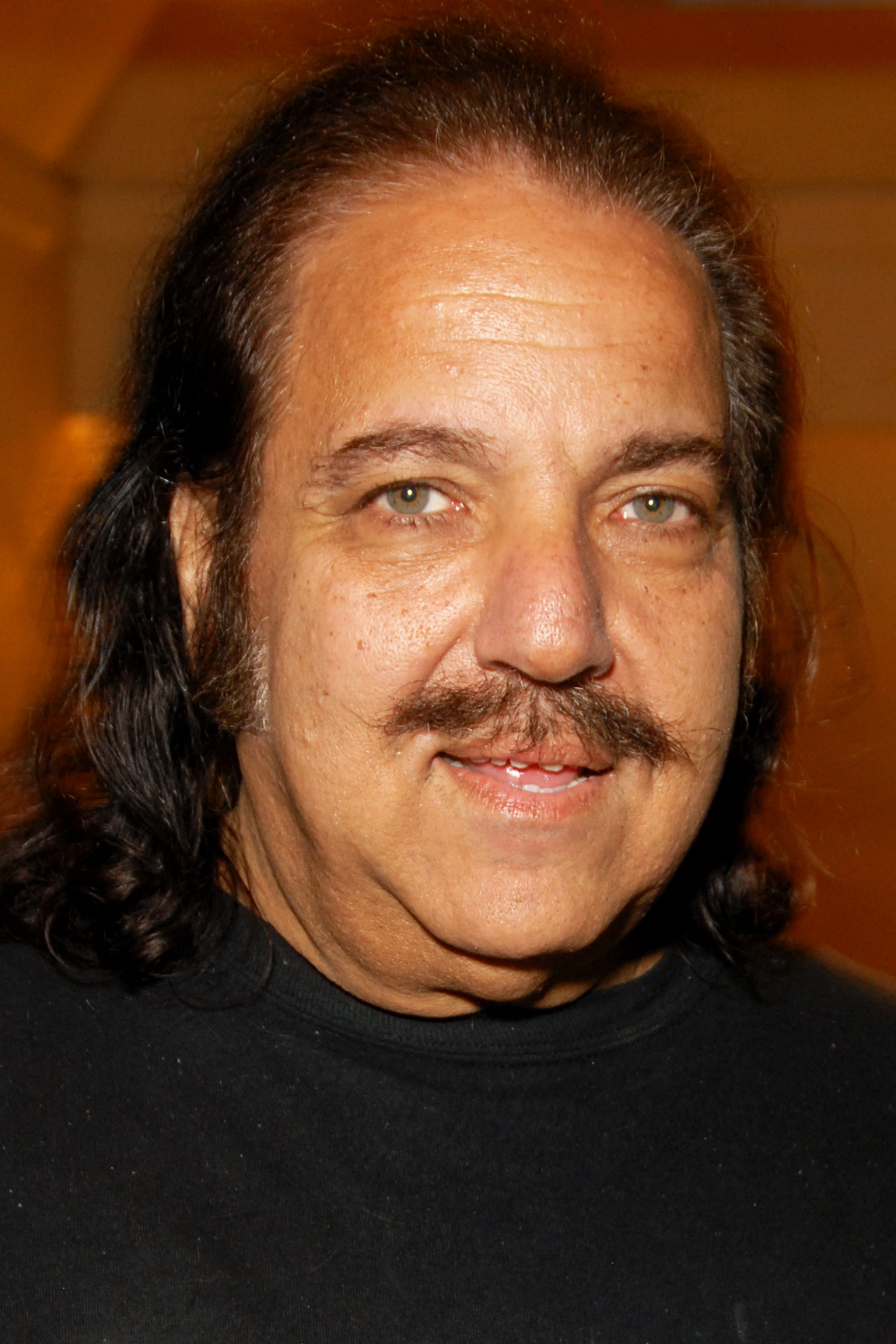
American porn star Ron Jeremy was ranked by AVN at number one in their "100 Top Porn Stars of All Time" list, and is listed in the Guinness World Records for "Most Appearances in Adult Films".

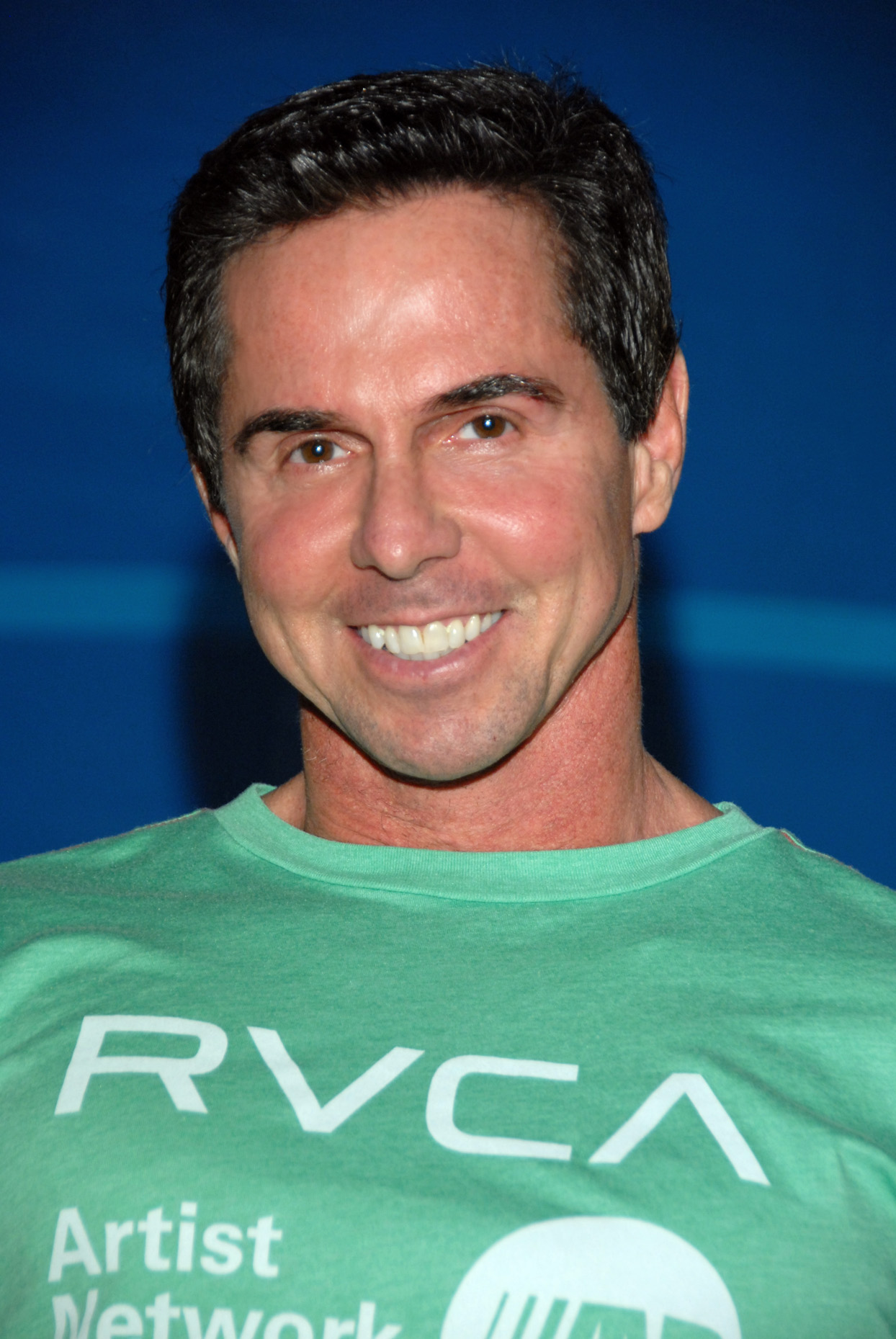
Canadian porn star Peter North, active since the early 1980s, was ranked at number 15 by AVN in their "100 Top Porn Stars of All Time" list.

While the primary focus of heterosexual adult films is the women in them, who are mostly selected for their on-screen appearance, there is a definite focus on the male performers who are able to fulfill the desires of the male watching audience as their on-screen proxies. Most male performers in heterosexual pornography are generally selected less for their looks and more for their sexual prowess, namely their ability to do three things: achieve an erection while on a busy and sometimes pressuring film set, maintain that erection while performing on camera, and then ejaculate on cue. However, the majority of on-screen ejaculations, semen, and "money shots" are artificial. In the past, an actor's inability to maintain an erection or being subject to premature ejaculation could make the difference between a film turning a profit or a loss. If an actor loses his erection, filming is forced to stop. This problem has been addressed with the use of Viagra, although Viagra can make the actor's face noticeably flushed, give him a headache, make it difficult to ejaculate, and take about 45 minutes to take effect. According to director John Stagliano, using Viagra means "You also lose a dimension. The guy's fucking without being aroused."

Ron Jeremy, John Holmes, and Rocco Siffredi are considered by AVN as the top male performers of all time. Adding to his fame, Ron Jeremy has been a staple in the industry since the 1970s and has become something of a cultural icon.

== Industry practices ==
=== Pay rates ===
==== By scene ====
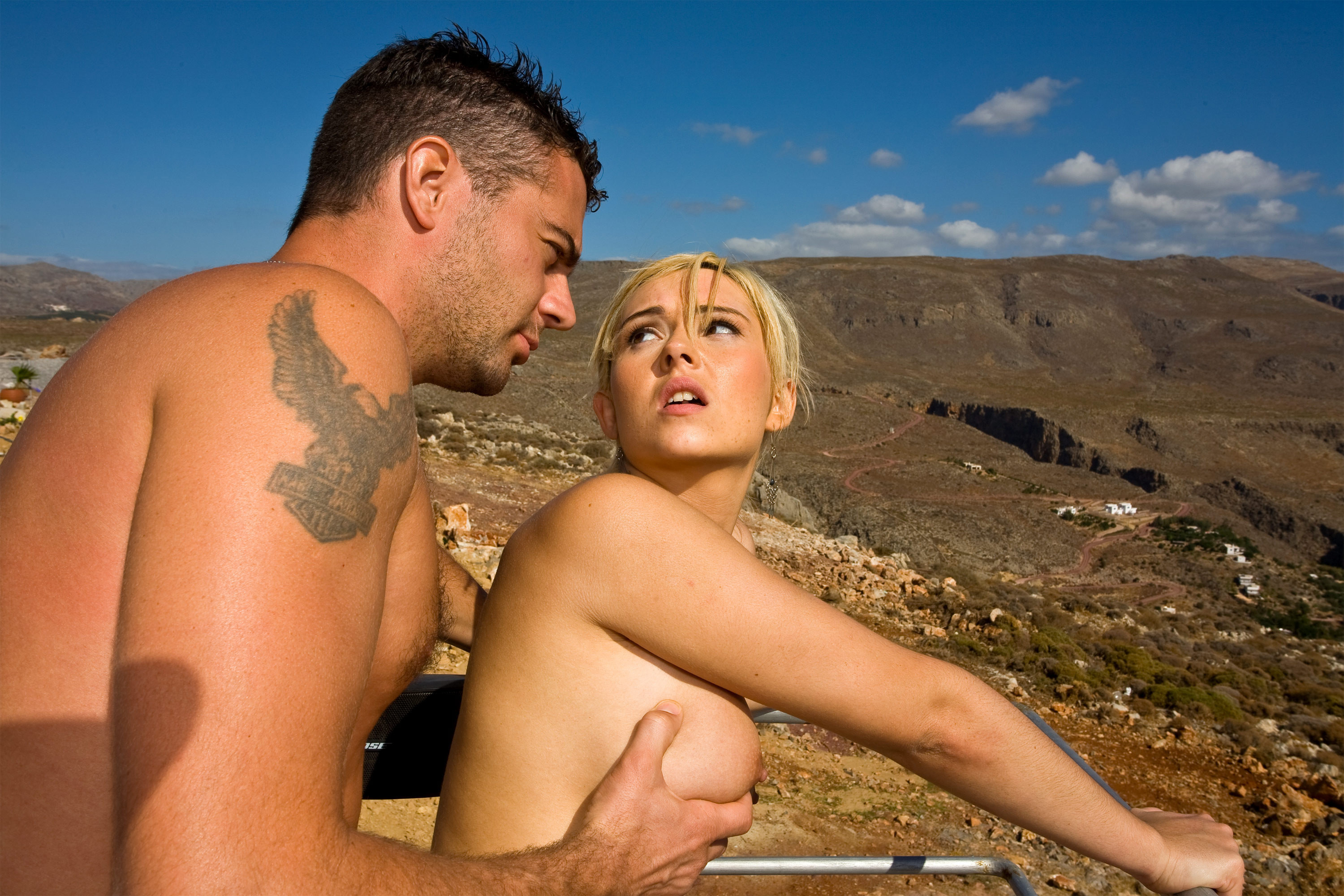
Performers shooting a scene (2009)

Payment for pornstars is dependent on the sex acts performed; penetration typically pays the highest. In a single scene, female actresses typically make between $120 and $6,000, while male actors make between $100 and $400.

In 2017, The Independent reported that female performers in scenes with male performers typically earn around $1,200, compared with $700–$850 in scenes with other females. The Independent also claimed that pay rates are subject to variation up or down by around 10–20%, depending on various factors. The Daily Beast claimed in 2019 that female performers could make between $300 and $2500 per scene, depending on their level of experience and the sex acts performed. Higher-paid female performers could make around $1200 per scene. The Los Angeles Times reported, in 2009, that the pay rates for a female actress performing heterosexual scenes were $700 to $1,000. According to the porn website Videobox in 2008, actresses make these rates: Blowjobs: $200–$400; Straight sex: $400–$1,200; Anal sex: $900–$1,500; Double Penetration: $1,200–$1,600; Double anal: $2,000. For more unusual fetishes, women generally get 16% extra.

Ron Jeremy commented in 2008 that, "The average guy gets $300 to $400 a scene, or $100 to $200 if he's new." According to producer Seymore Butts in 2007, who runs his own sex-film recruitment agency as well as producing sex films, "depending on draw, female performers who perform in both straight and lesbian porn earn more than those who do just heterosexual scenes [and] usually make about US$200–800 while those who only do oral sex (blow job) usually only make about US$100–300 for the scene". In a 2004 interview conducted by Local10 news of Florida, it was claimed that individuals were offered $700 for sexual intercourse while shooting a scene of the popular series Bang Bus. In 2001, actress Chloe said of pay-rates: "In Gonzo, you're paid not by the picture, but by the scene. So it's girl-girl: $700, plus $100 for an anal toy. Boy-girl: $900. Anal: $1,100. Solo: $500. DP: $1,500."

==== Salaries ====
Yearly salaries for female actresses typically range from $60,000 to $400,000, compared with $40,000 for male actors. In 2017, The Independent reported that top porn performers' salaries were around $300,000 to $400,000. In 2011, the manager of Capri Anderson said, "A contract girl will only shoot for one company, she won't shoot for anyone else. Most actresses in the adult industry are free agents – they'll shoot for anyone. Most contract girls make $60,000 a year. In one year, a contract girl will shoot, on average, four movies and each movie takes about two or three weeks to shoot."

==== Other payment ====
Besides appearing in films, porn stars often make money from endorsements and appearance fees. For instance, in 2010, some nightclubs were paying female porn stars and Playboy Playmates to appear there to act as draws for the general public; the Los Angeles Times reported that Jesse Jane was paid between $5,000 to $10,000 for one appearance by a Chicago club.

=== Health issues ===
In the 1980s, there was an outbreak of HIV/AIDS in the pornographic film industry which caused many deaths. This led to the creation of the Adult Industry Medical Health Care Foundation (AIM) in 1998, which voluntarily tested the pornographic performers for HIV, chlamydia and gonorrhea every 30 days; and twice a year for hepatitis, syphilis and HSV. AIM closed all its operations in May 2011.

Since 2011, STI testing for pornographic performers is being monitored by Free Speech Coalition, which set up the Adult Production Health and Safety Services (APHSS) system, now known as Performer Availability Screening Services (PASS). Performers are tested every fourteen days for HIV, syphilis, gonorrhea, chlamydia, hepatitis B and C and trichomoniasis. According to PASS, there has not been an on-set transmission of HIV on a regulated set since 2004.

== Awards ==
Exceptional performance of pornographic film actors and actresses is recognized in the AVN Awards, XRCO Awards and XBIZ Awards. The AVN Awards are film awards sponsored and presented by the American adult video industry trade magazine AVN (Adult Video News). They are called the "Oscars of porn". The AVN Awards are divided into nearly 100 categories, some of which are analogous to industry awards offered in other film and video genres, and others that are specific to pornographic/erotic film and video. The XRCO Awards are given by the X-Rated Critics Organization annually. The Venus Awards are presented each year in Berlin as part of the Venus Berlin trade fair.

== Media ==
=== Media and press coverage ===
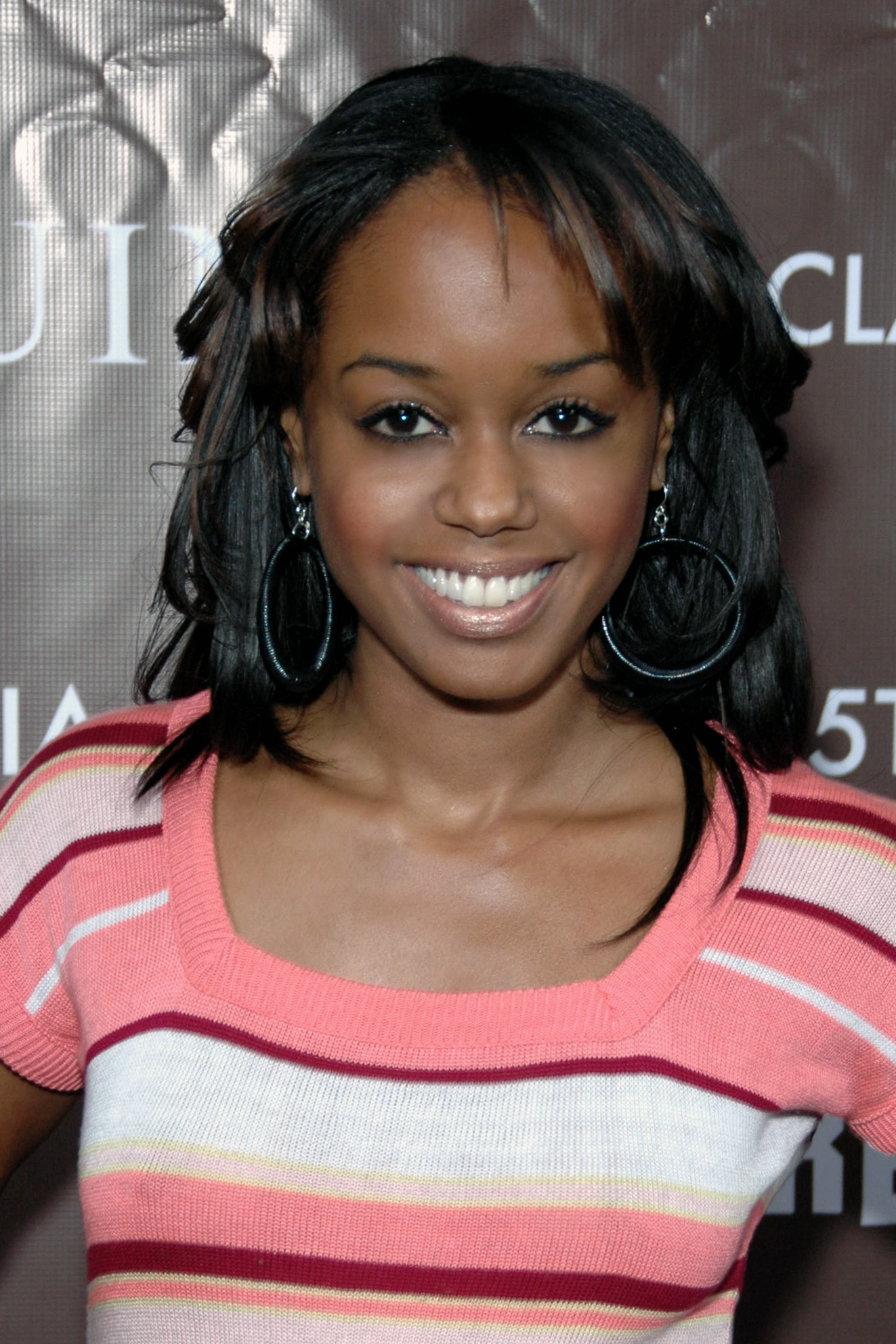
In fall 2009, the TV One series Life After chronicled Jaimee Foxworth's story in which she worked as a porn actress for a couple of years in order to support herself.

With some notable or occasional exceptions, pornographic film actors are not generally reported on by mainstream media. As a result, specialized publications (or trade journals) emerged to serve as a source of information about the industry, its business dealings, trends and forecasts, as well as its personnel. Two of the predominant media outlets are Adult Video News and XBIZ. Certain performers also have had their public accounts blocked on social media platforms.

The Internet Adult Film Database (IAFD) lists adult film productions dating back to the 1970s, the performers in those films, and the associated directors.

=== Autobiographies ===
A number of pornographic film actors and actresses have written autobiographies, including the following:

- Celia Blanco – Secretos de una pornostar (2005) (in Spanish)
- Jerry Butler – Raw Talent (1990, ISBN 087975625X)
- Marilyn Chambers – My Story (1975, ISBN 0446798274)
- Christy Canyon – Lights, Camera, SEX! (2005, ISBN 0972747001)
- Jenna Jameson – How to Make Love Like a Porn Star: A Cautionary Tale (2005)
- Ron Jeremy – The Hardest (Working) Man in Showbiz (2006, ISBN 0060840838)
- Traci Lords – Traci Lords: Underneath It All (2003)
- Linda Lovelace – Inside Linda Lovelace (1974), The Intimate Diary of Linda Lovelace (1974), Ordeal (1980), and Out of Bondage (1986)
- Shelley Lubben – Truth Behind the Fantasy of Porn: The Greatest Illusion on Earth (2010, ISBN 9781453860076)
- Monica Mayhem – Absolute Mayhem: Secret Confessions of a Porn Star (2010, ISBN 1616080914)
- Tera Patrick – Sinner Takes All: A Memoir of Love and Porn (2009, ISBN 1592405223)
- Kay Parker - Taboo: Sacred, Don't Touch (2001, ISBN 0971368406)
- Harry Reems – Here Comes Harry Reems! (1975, ISBN 0523004591)
- Rocco Siffredi – Io, Rocco (2006, ISBN 8804559950) (in Italian)
- Annie Sprinkle – Annie Sprinkle: Post-Porn Modernist (1991)
- Ilona Staller – Per amore e per forza (2007) (in Italian)
- Sunset Thomas – Anatomy of an Adult Film (2009, ISBN 1935444204)

== Discrimination ==
Porn actors have spoken out about discrimination they face due to their work, including being denied banking services and being fired from other jobs. Lana Rhoades and others faced difficulty when renting or buying a home. On numerous occasions, banks closed or refused to open the accounts of porn actors. Chanel Preston was among those whose bank account was closed due to her profession.

Porn actors also face discrimination from social media websites. Around 200 performers and models signed a letter to Facebook saying that their Instagram accounts were closed unfairly. Many say that they are being held to a different standard than mainstream celebrities. More than 1,300 performers claimed that their accounts have been deleted by Instagram's content moderators for violations of the site's community standards, despite not showing any nudity or sex. They claim that famous celebrities are allowed to be much more explicit on their accounts than porn stars or sex workers without getting sanctioned.

Over 100 platforms, including banks, payment processors, social media websites and hotels have been accused of discriminating against sex workers.

== See also ==
- AV idol
- List of pornographic film actors who appeared in mainstream films
- List of pornographic film studios
- List of members of the XRCO Hall of Fame
