= Ginger Lynn =

American pornographic film actress (born 1962)

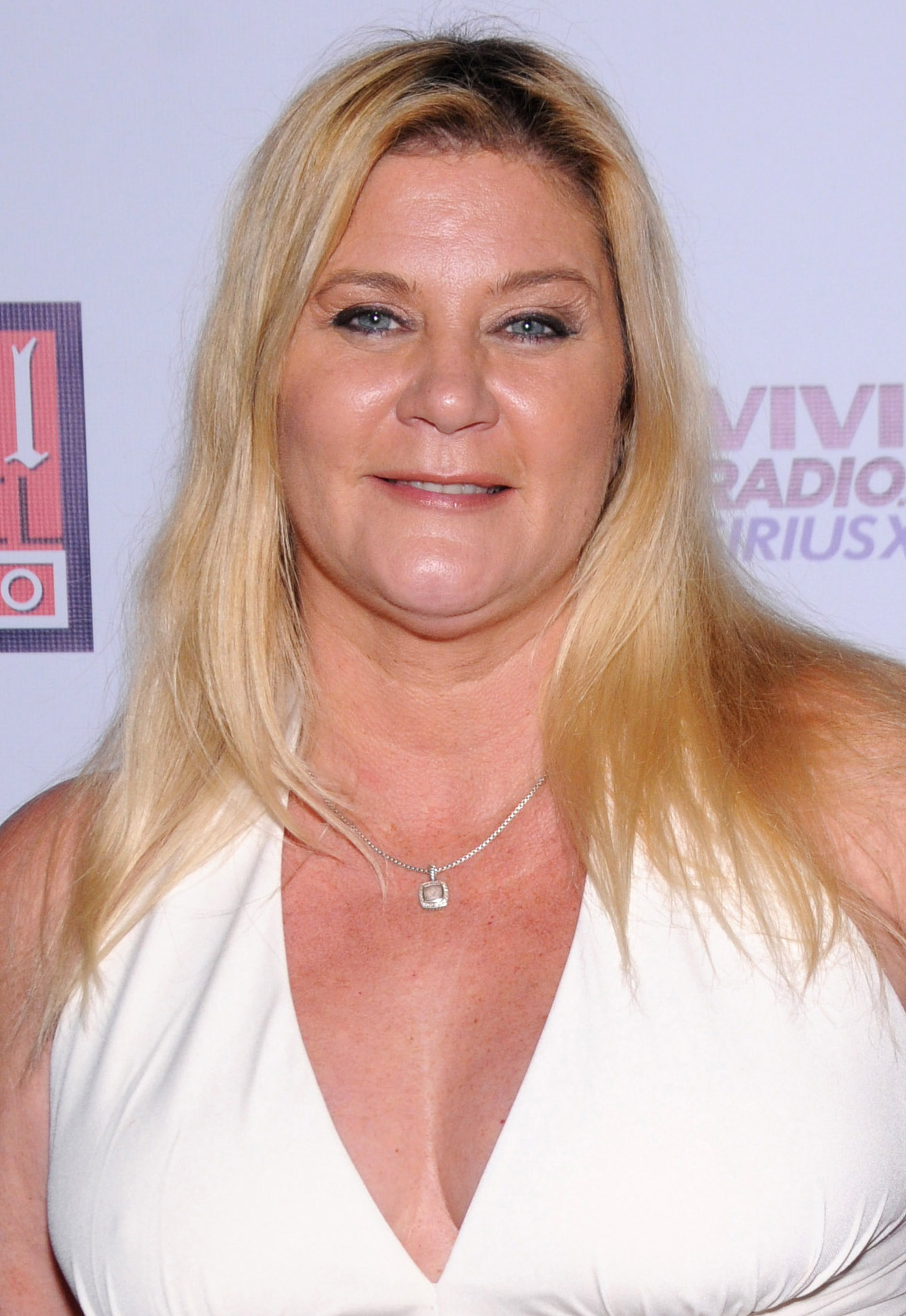
- Lynn in 2014
- Born: Ginger Lynn Allen; December 14, 1962 (age 63); Rockford, Illinois, U.S.
- Occupations: Pornographic film actress; model
- Years active: 1982–Present
- Children: 1

Ginger Lynn Allen (born December 14, 1962) is an American pornographic film actress and model who was a star of adult films during the 1980s. AVN ranked her at #7 of the 50 greatest porn stars of all time in 2002. In 1986, she left the adult film industry and found work in a variety of B movies using her full name. She returned to performing in pornographic films during the 2000s. Allen is a member of AVN, NightMoves, XRCO, and Urban X Halls of Fame.

== Early life ==
Ginger Lynn Allen was born and raised in Rockford, Illinois, she moved to California in 1982 to become her grandfather's caregiver following his heart attack. After he died, she had her "first nice boyfriend" move in with her. Allen, the breadwinner of the two, felt obligated to find a lucrative occupation. When she answered an advertisement from the World Modeling Agency in September 1983, she immediately signed a contract with that agency and did pictorials for Cheri, Club, Hustler, and Penthouse, which brought her to the attention of the adult entertainment industry.

== Career ==
=== Adult films ===
Allen began as a nude model and then began performing in hardcore sex films as Ginger Lynn by December 1983. Her first pornographic movie role was in Surrender in Paradise, in which she starred with Jerry Butler. Allen's "girl next door" good looks led to a quick rise in her popularity and eventually she became one of the most popular female performers in adult-entertainment history. She had her own line of videos through Vivid Entertainment with the director Bruce Seven. Allen received the Best New Starlet award in 1985 and is an inductee to the X-Rated Critics Organization (XRCO) and Adult Video News (AVN) halls of fame. Allen signed a contract with Vivid Entertainment founder, Steven Hirsch, making her the first 'Vivid Girl' and beating out the then-underaged Traci Lords. She was later called to testify on Lords' behalf against porn producers; she refused and, according to her, was then targeted by the Internal Revenue Service for falsification of a tax return.

=== Mainstream ===
In February 1986, Allen left the adult film industry in order to establish herself in mainstream films by using her full name. That same year, she contributed vocals to Fantasy World, a single released by the music group Ginger. Allen appeared in several non-adult films, television shows and interactive movie segments of the Wing Commander computer games. She started her career in mainstream features with a small part in the western Young Guns II, which co-starred Emilio Estevez, brother of her future boyfriend Charlie Sheen.

Allen was the subject of an episode of the documentary series E! True Hollywood Story in 2002. Allen appeared in another episode about her relationship with actor Charlie Sheen in 2010.

In December 2005, she appeared in American Pie Presents: Band Camp (2005) playing the supporting role of Nurse Sanders. In the same year, she portrayed Fanny in Rob Zombie's thriller film The Devil's Rejects and later starred as Cherry Bomb in Zombie's slasher film 31.

=== Adult return ===
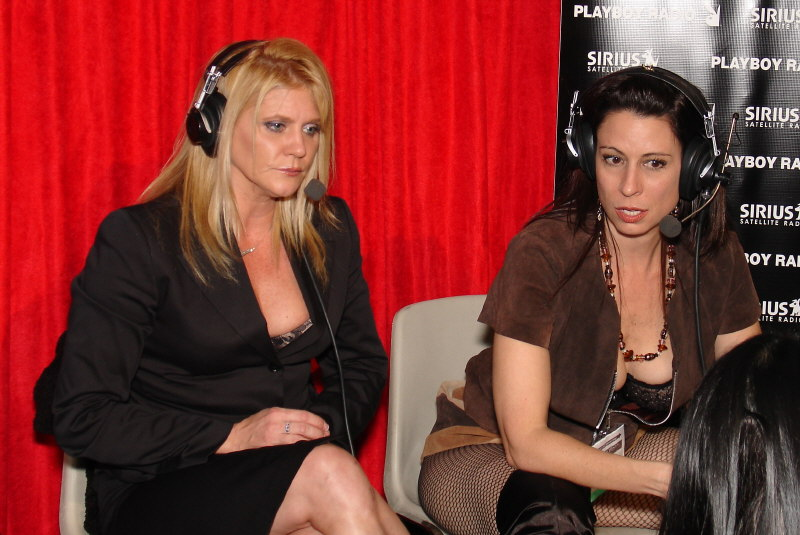
Lynn and Christy Canyon in 2007

Allen returned to the adult-entertainment industry in 1999 for three movies: Torn (1999), White Lightning (2000), and New Wave Hookers 6 (2000). In March 2006, she became a host of Playboy Radio's Sirius Satellite Radio show, Night Calls Radio, with former adult-entertainment performer Christy Canyon. In June 2007, Allen performed for two of Kink.com's hardcore websites, Ultimate Surrender and Sex and Submission.

== Personal life ==
Allen had a relationship with Charlie Sheen from 1990 to 1992 and accompanied him through drug rehabilitation. Despite consistent claims that Sheen has been physically abusive towards women, Lynn has said she never experienced abuse: "Not one time did he raise his voice. No violence." She had a relationship with actor George Clooney.

In 1991, Lynn served four and a half months in prison for tax evasion. In 1996, Lynn had a son with porn producer Steven Hirsch.

== Filmography ==
=== Adult film ===
- 1984 Surrender In Paradise as Tammy
- 1984 Too Good to Be
- True as Felicia
- 1984 The Pink Lagoon as Tammy
- 1984 Panty Raid as Wendy
- 1984 The Pleasures
- Hunt as Sharon Knight
- 1984 Night of Loving Dangerously as Trixie
- 1984 Kinky Business – AVN Awards 1985 Best Couple in a Sex Scene (with Tom Byron) as Gloria
- 1984 Illusions of Ecstasy as Melanie
- 1984 Electric Blue 17 as Miss Johnson
- 1984 Suze's Centerfolds 8 as Tennis Player (Sex Athletics)
- 1984 Up Up and Away as Gail
- 1984 China and Silk as Mandy Walker
- 1984 Those Young Girls as Ginger
- 1984 Girls on Fire as Suzie
- 1984 Slumber Party – AVN Awards 1986 Best Couple in a Sex Scene (with Eric Edwards) as Dawn
- 1984 Jailhouse Girls as Joanne MacIntyre
- 1984 Electric Blue 19 as Bev
- 1985 Trashy Lady as Kitty
- 1985 Ten Little Maidens – AVN Awards 1986 Best Couples Sex Scene as Carol
- 1985 Taboo 4: The Younger Generation as Robin Lodge
- 1985 Suzie Superstar II as Tina
- 1985 New Wave Hookers as Cherry
- 1985 Ginger Lynn: The Movie – AVN Awards 2006 Best Classic Release on DVD as Ginger
- 1985 Surrender In Paradise as Tammy
- 1985 Project: Ginger – AVN Awards 1986 Best Actress – Video as Ginger
- 1985 Electric Blue: Beverly Hills Wives as Rich Woman
- 1985 Ginger On The Rocks as Ginger
- 1985 Poonies as Ginger
- 1986 Blame It on Ginger as Ginger
- 1986 Beverly Hills Cox as Suzy Cox
- 1986 Electric Blue 39 as Pepper
- 1986 Electric Blue 42 as Nurse Diane
- 1986 Electric Blue 43 as Rachel
- 1987 Blow-Off as Mrs. White
- 1987 Ginger & Spice as Ginger / Ricebird
- 1987 Ginger Snaps as Ginger
- 1987 Electric Blue 47 as Bumper
- 1987 Electric Blue 51 as Muffin Delight
- 1999 Ginger Lynn's Torn – XRCO Awards 1999 Best Lesbo Scene (with Chloe) as Clarisse Bijou
- 2000 New Wave Hookers 6 as Audrey
- 2000 White Lightning as Gabby White
- 2001 Taken – 2002 AVN Award for Best Actress as Kim
- 2002 Devon Stripped as Wanda
- 2002 Crime & Passion as Kim
- 2002 Sunset Stripped as Katherine Connors
- 2002 Behind Closed Doors as Woman
- 2004 Last Movie as Ginger
- 2004 Love and Bullets as Karen Roman
- 2007 Dirty Rotten Mother Fucker
- 2008 Big Loves 4
- 2008 Blacks On Cougars
- 2008 Watching My Mom Go Black
- 2009 My First Sex Teacher 17
- 2009 The Cougar Club 2
- 2009 White Mommas
- 2009 Ginger Loves Girls! as Ginger
- 2010 Saw: A Hardcore Parody as Police Secretary

=== Director ===
- 1994 Lingerie Gallery
- 1994 Lingerie Gallery, Volume 2
- 2003 Ginger Lynn's School of Head
- 2004 Ultimate Reel People: Volume 1
- 2004 Ultimate Reel People: Volume 2
- 2004 Ultimate Reel People: Volume 3
- 2004 Ultimate Reel People: Volume 4

=== Mainstream film ===
- 1984 Bachelor Party as Herself, Angel and the Reruns
- 1989 Dr. Alien as Rocker Chick #1
- 1989 Cleo/Leo as Karen
- 1989 Vice Academy as Holly Wells
- 1989 Wild Man as Dawn Hall
- 1989 Satan's Storybook as Christeeth
- 1990 Buried Alive as Debbie
- 1990 Young Guns II as Dove
- 1990 Hollywood Boulevard II as Candy Chandler
- 1990 Vice Academy Part 2 as Holly Wells
- 1991 Whore as Wounded Girl
- 1991 Leather Jackets as Bree
- 1991 Vice Academy Part 3 as Holly Wells
- 1992 Mind, Body & Soul as Brenda
- 1993 Trouble Bound as Girl In Porn Movie On TV
- 1993 Bound & Gagged: A Love Story as Leslie
- 1995 Ultimate Taboo as Shannon
- 1995 The Stranger as Sally Womack
- 1996 God's Lonely Man as AA Speaker
- 1996 Vice Academy 5 as Prison Inmate
- 1998 Vice Academy 6 as Holly
- 2000 The Independent as Mayor Kitty Storm
- 2000 The Last Late Night as Sophia Carteris
- 2003 Evil Breed: The Legend of Samhain as Pandora
- 2004 Save Virgil as Virgil's Mother
- 2005 The Devil's Rejects as Fanny
- 2005 American Pie Presents Band Camp as Nurse Sanders
- 2006 Kisses and Caroms (aka American Pool) as Mrs. Whiteman
- 2016 31 as "Cherry Bomb"
- 2016 Streets of Vengeance as Roxy Carmichael
- 2019 Dirty Blonde as Barbara Rankin
- 2020 Slashlorette Party as Dr. Petra Jordan
- 2020 Killer Waves 2 as Felicity Clam Dragger
- 2021 New York Ninja as Nita Liu
- 2022 Pig Killer as Louise
- 2023 Murdercise as Dominica Stromboli
- 2024 Babezilla vs the Cyber Skanks: Rise of MechaBabezilla as Momzilla
- 2025 Doctor Deathface as Eva
- 2025 Dorothea as Betty Palmer

=== Television ===
- 1991–1992 Super Force as Crystal Chandler
- 1993 NYPD Blue as Monique
- 1994 Silk Stalkings as Laura Gallow / Galatea
- 2003 Skin as Amber Synn
- 2003 X-Rated Ambition: The Traci Lords Story as Herself
- 2006 Gene Simmons Family Jewels as Herself
- 2010 The Dog Whisperer as Herself
- 2012 Dave's Old Porn as Herself
- 2016 X-Rated 2: The Greatest Adult Stars of All Time as Herself
- 2017 After Porn Ends 2 as Herself
- 2018 Porndemic as Herself

=== Other media ===
- Wing Commander III: Heart of the Tiger, Wing Commander: Prophecy (computer games) as Chief Technician Rachel Coriolis
- Sang on 12 33 rpm [Fantasy World] (with Janus Jarrow) on Mach IV productions label.
- Night Calls on Playboy Radio with Christy Canyon on Sirius Satellite Radio
- She has appeared in pictorials for Playboy, Cinema Blue, Chéri, High Society, Club International, and Celebrity Sleuth
- The Ginger Lynn Show on KSEX Radio in Los Angeles
- In the 1998 music video for Metallica's cover of "Turn the Page", she portrayed a stripper/prostitute traveling with her child.
- She provided a voice for the song "Ginger Snaps/Monkey Business" for Danger Danger's second album, Screw It!
- Most recently she appeared on the podcast Betamax Rewind with Matt and Doug to talk about her early porn career

== Awards ==
- 1985 XRCO Starlet of the Year
- 1985 XRCO Video Vixen
- 1985 XRCO Female Performer of the Year
- 1985 AVN Best New Starlet
- 1985 AVN Best Couples Sex Scene – Film for Kinky Business (with Tom Byron)
- 1985 XRCO Best Group Grope Scene for New Wave Hookers (with Steve Powers and Tom Byron)
- 1986 AVN Best Actress – Video for Project: Ginger
- 1986 AVN Best Couples Sex Scene – Video for Slumber Party (with Eric Edwards)
- 1986 AVN Best Couples Sex Scene – Film for Ten Little Maidens
- 1995 XRCO Hall of Fame
- 2000 Legends of Erotica Hall of Fame
- 2000 XRCO Best Girl-Girl Scene for Torn (with Chloe)
- 2000 Porn Block of Fame
- AVN Hall of Fame
- 2002 AVN Best Actress – Film for Taken
- 2002 Exotic Dancer Hall of Fame
- 2002 Free Speech Coalition Lifetime Achievement Award
- 2002 NightMoves National Lifetime Achievement Award
- 2007 NightMoves Hall of Fame
- 2024 Urban X Hall of Fame

== See also ==
- Golden Age of Porn
