= Dave's Old Porn =

- Genre: Comedy
- Starring: Dave Attell
- Theme music composer: Bob Golden
- Country of origin: United States
- Original language: English
- No. of seasons: 2
- No. of episodes: 16

Production
- Executive producers: Dave Attell; Stewart Bailey
- Camera setup: Film; Single-camera
- Running time: 26 minutes
- Production company: Showtime

Original release
- Network: Showtime
- Release: October 20, 2011 – December 27, 2012

Dave's Old Porn is a comedy show starring Dave Attell that premiered on Showtime on October 20, 2011. Attell has described the series as "the Mystery Science Theater of porn." Through the show's Twitter account, Attell said Showtime passed on a third season, and that he intended to continue the show in a smaller form through the website.

== Plot ==
Attell and his co-hosts review pornographic films from the genre's golden age of the 1970s and 1980s. Attell is joined by a fellow comedian to make jokes about a variety of porn clips. Typically, the pair view clips from movies of one particular porn star. Then, near the end of the episode, they are joined by the porn star whose movies they've been viewing over the course of the episode.

All sexual acts such as fellatio, cunnilingus, genitalia and ejaculations are censored, with either an image of a VHS cassette, cartoons, food, a strategically placed image of Attell's face, or the sofa the hosts are using.

== Episodes and guests ==
=== Season 1 ===
Episode	Air Date	Comedian(s)	Porn Star(s)	Movies	Movie Year	Featured Porn Stars
1	October 20, 2011	Whitney Cummings	Ron Jeremy	Tramp; Bad Girls; Bad Girls II; E3: The 'Extra Testicle'; Bad Girls IV	1980; 1981; 1983; 1985; 1986	Pia Snow; Ron Jeremy; John Leslie; Jacqueline Lorains
2	October 27, 2011	Chelsea Handler; The Sklar Brothers	—	The Pony Girls; Teenage Twins; Teenage Madam; 800 Fantasy Lane; That's My Daughter; Expose Me Now; Rub Down	1976; 1976; 1977; 1979; 1982; 1983; 1985	Jamie Gillis; Harry Reems; Brooke and Taylor Young
3	November 3, 2011	—	Belladonna; Bobbi Starr; Kristina Rose	Pleasure Motel; Gina: The Foxy Chick; Like Mother, Like Daughter; Teenage Madam; Lure of the Triangle; California Gigolo; The Untamed; 800 Fantasy Lane; Sweet Throat; Call Girl; Spermbusters	1973; 1974; 1974; 1977; 1978; 1979; 1979; 1979; 1980; 1982; 1985	Lisa De Leeuw; Olinka; Beth Anna
4	November 10, 2011	Bill Burr	Nina Hartley	The Ultimate Lover; The Black Mystique; Sorority Pink; Sorority Pink 2	1986; 1986; 1989; 1989	Nina Hartley; Tracey Adams; Amber Lynn; Porsche Lynn; Eric Edwards; Ron Jeremy
5	November 17, 2011	Adam Carolla	Georgina Spelvin	The Devil in Miss Jones; 3 A.M. Fantasy; For Richer for Poorer; The Seven Seductions	1973; 1975; 1979; 1979; 1981	Georgina Spelvin; Harry Reems; Robert Kerman
6	November 24, 2011	Jim Norton	Seka	Flesh of the Lotus; Heavenly Desire; On White Satin; Ultra Flesh; Prisoner of Paradise; Sweet Alice	1971; 1979; 1980; 1980; 1980; 1983	Seka; Paul Thomas; John Leslie; Luis De Jesus; Johnny Keyes; John Holmes
7	December 1, 2011	Margaret Cho	Paul Thomas	Shiela's Payoff; Untamed; Deep Rub; Fantasy World	1977; 1979; 1979; 1979	Paul Thomas; Desireé Cousteau; Serena; Annette Haven; Kay Parker
8	December 8, 2011	Greg Fitzsimmons	Sharon Kane	Small Town Girls; Fantasy World; Deep Rub; Summer School; Fantasy; Hot Legs; Nasty Girls; Sorority Pink 2	1979; 1977; 1977; 1977; 1977; 1977; 1983; 1989	Sharon Kane; John Holmes; Laurien Dominique; Paul Thomas; Nina Hartley

=== Season 2 ===
Episode	Air Date	Comedian(s)/Celebrity Co-Host	Porn Star(s)	Movies	Movie Year(s)	Featured Porn Stars
1	November 8, 2012	Kathy Griffin	Tom Byron	Private Teacher; Tomboy; Little Girls Talking Dirty; Ginger Does 'Em All; Loose Times at Ridley High; Private Teacher; Spermbusters; Suzie Superstar...The Search Continues; Naughty Neighbors; Taboo American Style #3	1983; 1984; 1985; 1988; 1989; 2001	Misty Regan; Tom Byron; Joey Silvera; Janey Robbins; Victoria Paris; Kassi Nova
2	November 15, 2012	Joe Rogan	Ginger Lynn	Undressed Rehearsal; Modeling Studio; Ball Busters; Panty Raid; The Pink Lagoon: A Sex Romp In Paradise; Pretty As You Feel; Girls On Fire	1984	Ginger Lynn; Jerry Butler; Raven; Lois Ayres; John Holmes
3	November 22, 2012	Amy Schumer	Robert Kerman	Debbie Does Dallas; Pleasure Palace; Lorelei	1978; 1979; 1984	Bambi Woods; Robert Kerman; Serena; Herschel Savage; Eric Edwards; Jamie Gillis
4	November 29, 2012	Artie Lange	Vanessa del Rio	Swedish Erotica #29; Little Big Man; Jacquette; Afternoon Delights; Co-Ed Fever; The Filthy Rich: A 24 K-Dirty Movie; Aphrodesia's Diary	1976; 1980; 1981; 1984	Vanessa Del Rio; Jessie St. James
5	December 6, 2012	Judah Friedlander; Rob Zombie	Joanna Angel	Tomatoes; Devil's Ecstasy; Three Cheers For BJU; Born Erect; The Bride's Initiation; F (And Lots Of It); Water Power	1970; 1974; 1976; 1980	John Leslie; Marc Brock
6	December 13, 2012	Lisa Lampanelli	Herschel Savage; Ron Jeremy	The Good Girls of Godiva High; The Blonde; Expose Me Now; Beverly Hills Wives; Marina Heat	1980; 1982; 1985	Amber Lynn; Tracey Adams; Herschel Savage; Honey Wilder; Gretchen Sweet; Richard Pacheco; Danielle Martin
7	December 20, 2012	Marc Maron	Christy Canyon	Dirty Sharry; You Make Me Wet; Doctor Desire; Sore Throat; Swedish Erotica 58; Hypnotic Sensations	1984; 1985	Christy Canyon; Paul Thomas; Robin Cannes; Don Hart; Ron Jeremy; Bunny Bleu; Ginger Lynn
8	December 27, 2012	Andy Dick; Adrianne Curry	Sean Michaels; Kayden Kross; Jesse Jane; Asa Akira	The Blowhard; Virgin Dreams; All The Senator's Girls; California Gigolo; Frat House; Ultra Flesh; The Little French Maid; Call Girl	1974; 1977; 1979; 1980; 1981; 1983	John Holmes; Olinka
