= Taboo (1980 film) =

1980 American pornographic film

- Film Poster
- Directed by: Kirdy Stevens
- Written by: Helene Terrie
- Produced by: Helene Terrie
- Starring: Kay Parker; Dorothy LeMay; Mike Ranger; Miko Yani; Juliet Anderson
- Cinematography: Guy Nicholas
- Edited by: Kirdy Stevens
- Music by: Don Great
- Production company: Dart Enterprises
- Distributed by: Gloff Films; VCX; Standard Video; Addictive Entertainment; Marc Dorcel Productions; Vinegar Syndrome; Alpha Blue Archives
- Release date: March 7, 1980; (US)
- Running time: 86 min.
- Country: United States
- Language: English

Taboo is a 1980 American pornographic film starring Kay Parker. It was written and produced by Helene Terrie and edited and directed by Kirdy Stevens. The film is the first of a series of 23 episodes to date (from 1980 to 2007).

== Plot ==
Barbara Scott (Kay Parker) is performing oral sex on her husband Chris (Turk Lyon). Exasperated by Barbara's insistence on doing it with the lights out, her husband leaves the marriage. Their only child, Paul (Mike Ranger), a high school student, stays with Barbara. She begins to look for work with little success at first. Seeing her sad and without company, her friend Gina (Juliet Anderson) gets her a date with a friend, who takes her to a swingers party.

Her son Paul has a girlfriend Sherry (Dorothy LeMay), but also shows a sexual attraction to his mother as she prepares for her date. Barbara leaves her door open, allowing Paul to see her nude, and he starts masturbating to Barbara without her apparent knowledge.

Barbara's date is a failure, but while at the swingers party she observes many nude couples having sex, and is feeling intense lust after returning home. After seeing her son nude asleep in bed, she develops previously unthinkable sexual feelings for her son. Barbara enters Paul's room and acts on her taboo feelings, manipulating his penis to erection. After Paul awakens he joins in enthusiastically and they have full penis in vagina intercourse. Paul withdraws his penis and ejaculates between Barbara's breasts. Regretful at their violation of the incest taboo and not knowing what to do, Barbara takes refuge affectionately in an old friend, Jerry, who in addition to company and affection gives her a job.

== Cast ==
- Kay Parker as Barbara Scott
- Dorothy LeMay as Sherry
- Mike Ranger as Paul Scott
- Miko Yani as Girl with Gina
- Juliet Anderson as Gina
- Tawny Pearl as Diane
- Lee LeMay as Charlie
- Turk Lyon as Chris Scott
- Milton Ingley as Jerry Morgan (as Michael Morrison)
- Holly McCall as Marlene

== Reception ==
In 1983, the film won an Homer Award from the prestigious Video Software Dealers Association in the category of Best Adult Tape (an inaugural award for X-rated films). The recognition was considered by many as a turning point in the acceptance of adult entertainment by the mainstream video industry. At Website Adams Underground praised Kay Parker's performance ("(Parker)...envelops the role of Barbara with a gentle, sensuous mist of sophisticated feminine allure that tantalizes with tangible passion stirring deep within that magnificent bosom") and the movie's visuals. But criticized the unrealistic portrayal of incest, the movie's ending and several technical aspects of the film, including the editing and the sound. Concluding: "In closing, all of Taboo's flaws amount to nothing more than a quickly forgotten boo-boo that Barbara sweetly kisses away with a warm tenderness that leaves you with indelible, pleasant memories." Roger Feelbert from Pornonomy gave the film a B+ rating, stating: "Overall, Taboo was well paced and acted and while I personally think it could have benefited from a slightly darker tone (something akin to 3 AM), as its own entity it's befitting of the place it holds in porn history." Roger T. Pipe from Rogreviews gave the film 11 out of 12 stars and said about "Taboo": "I don't think anyone is going to pick this up expecting a modern raincoater flick. If you were looking for that, please look elsewhere. The sex scenes are short, softer than we are used to and simply not up to the best of what we get these days. That's the down side of course. On the bright side, we get to see a classic.".

Steve Pulaski from Steve The Movie Man called the film a "landmark in porn...that could very well be considered an early American, feature-length porn film focusing on a fetish, in this case, mother/son incest". He also noted that "Taboo" was written by a woman and in its core, the film is about how women are treated in our society: "The film, at its core, shows how a woman is rejected from everything, society, employers, and even her husband for allegedly not being good enough, and the first time she finally does something she wants, she's overcome with guilt and shame. Who would've thought a pornographic film would ever go this deep (metaphorically speaking)?"

== See also ==
- Golden Age of Porn
