= X-Rated Ambition: The Traci Lords Story =

2003 British documentary film

- Directed by: Simon Kerslake
- Narrated by: Jo Unwin
- Music by: James Dorman
- Country of origin: United Kingdom
- Original language: English

Production
- Producers: Helen Booth; Simon Kerslake
- Editor: Mark Henson
- Running time: 50 minutes
- Production companies: Channel 5; World of Wonder

Original release
- Release: 2003

X-Rated Ambition: The Traci Lords Story is a 2003 British documentary film directed by Simon Kerslake. It follows American actress Traci Lords' career in the adult film industry when she, at the age of only 15, became one of the biggest pornstars. The documentary features interviews with many of her co-workers from that time including porn agent Jim South, photographer Suze Randall and pornstars Tom Byron, Ginger Lynn, Peter North, Ron Jeremy, Amber Lynn and Nina Hartley.

== Synopsis ==
In 1984, a young girl named Kristie Elizabeth Nussman walked into the office of the porn agent Jim South searching for a job. She became known as Traci Lords, one of the most sought-after pornstars of the 1980s. However, nobody knew that Nussman was actually Nora Kuzma, a fifteen-year-old runaway who by the time she was eighteen had already appeared in dozens of X-rated films.

== Cast ==
- Traci Lords (archive footage)
- Jim South
- Suze Randall
- Tom Byron
- Ginger Lynn
- Peter North
- Ron Jeremy
- Amber Lynn
- Nina Hartley
