= Whiskey Business =

- The Simpsons episode
- Episode no.: Season 24; Episode 19
- Directed by: Matthew Nastuk
- Written by: Valentina L. Garza
- Production code: RABF12
- Original air date: May 5, 2013

Guest appearances
- Tony Bennett as himself; Kevin Michael Richardson as cop; Sonny Rollins as himself; Ron Taylor as Bleeding Gums Murphy (archive recordings)

Episode features
- Couch gag: Three men carve a block of ice into the Simpsons sitting on the couch. Grampa Simpson comes in and turns on the heat. The ice sculpture melts.

Episode chronology
← Previous "Pulpit Friction"	Next → "The Fabulous Faker Boy"
- The Simpsons season 24

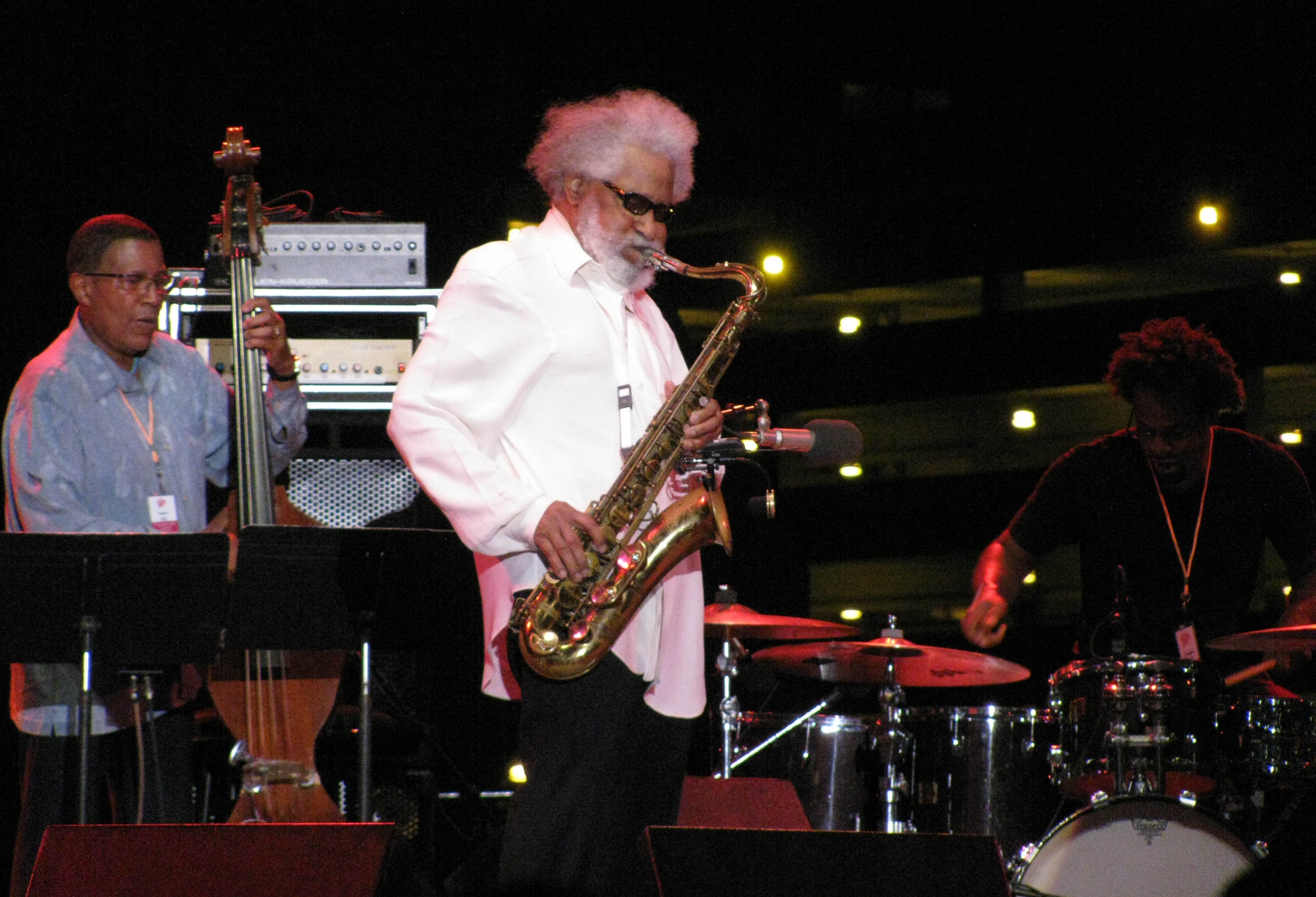
Jazz legend Sonny Rollins (pictured here shortly before his retirement from performing in 2012) voiced himself in this episode

"Whiskey Business" is the nineteenth episode of the twenty-fourth season of the American animated television series The Simpsons, and the 527th episode overall. Its title is a play on Risky Business. The episode was directed by Matthew Nastuk and written by Valentina L. Garza. It originally aired on the Fox network in the United States on May 5, 2013.

In this episode, Moe's new whiskey gains the attention of venture capitalists while Bart cares for Grampa after an injury. Musicians Tony Bennett and Sonny Rollins appeared as themselves. The episode received mixed reviews.

In its original airing, "Whiskey Business" was delayed 25 minutes in Eastern and Central time zones due to the end of a NASCAR race at Talladega Superspeedway which was delayed more than 3 1/2 hours due to rain.

== Plot ==
Noticing that Moe has fallen into a bout of suicidal depression, Homer, Marge, Lenny and Carl take him on an excursion to Capital City and buy him a new suit to lift his spirits. His enthusiasm restored, Moe fixes up his bar in order to attract a better class of customers and brings out a batch of homemade whiskey. Two venture capitalists stop by the bar, sample the drink, and are so impressed that they offer to become Moe's business partners in marketing it. Shortly before the new company's initial public offering, his suit is destroyed when he gets caught in an elevator door. Moe appears at the stock exchange in his ordinary clothes and addresses the traders for the IPO, but he inadvertently scares them so badly that his stock price plummets and the company becomes worthless. Returning to his once-again-squalid bar, he brightens up enough to sweep up the pieces of a broken beer mug and forgets about committing suicide, at least for the time being.

Meanwhile, Grampa watches the children while Homer and Marge are away. An elaborate prank by Bart, Dolph, Jimbo, and Kearney leads to Grampa being injured, and Bart decides to care for him at home in order to avoid getting in trouble. With Grampa hiding in the basement to avoid being found, the two enjoy playing tricks on Homer. Grampa recovers quickly, but fakes a lingering injury in order to make sure that Bart keeps looking after him. Bart eventually discovers the deception and is angry, but the two reconcile after Grampa explains that he liked getting the sort of personal attention that he never could receive at the nursing home.

In order to keep Lisa from finding out about Grampa, Bart sends her to a jazz club where an all-star jam session is taking place. She is shocked to see Bleeding Gums Murphy among the performers, as she knows him to be dead, and discovers that he is actually a hologram. Outraged, she tries to start a boycott of Murphy's record label; shortly afterward, she is surprised to receive a visit from saxophonist Sonny Rollins at home. Rollins explains that holograms are simply the next step in the development of the entertainment industry. Realizing that he too is a hologram sent by the record company, Lisa becomes annoyed when the company proceeds to beam commercials that feature Diana, Princess of Wales, Tupac Shakur and Mahatma Gandhi into her living room.

== Production ==
In October 2012, TVLine reported that musician Sonny Rollins would guest star as himself as a hologram. An archival recording of musician Tony Bennett singing "Capital City" appears in the episode. The song first appeared in the second season episode "Dancin' Homer" and also appeared in the fourteenth season episode "Bart vs. Lisa vs. the Third Grade."

Due to NASCAR overrun, the episode did not broadcast until 8:30 PM.

== Reception ==
=== Critical reception ===
This episode received mixed reviews from critics.

Robert David Sullivan of The A.V. Club gave the episode a C−, saying "I've been complaining about the dark humor in many Simpsons episodes this season, but it's unimaginative dark humor that's disappointing. I'm a champion of the episode 'Homer's Enemy,' all the way to its grim conclusion, and I love every blood-spurting moment of the Itchy and Scratchy cartoons. But 'Whiskey Business' just bangs on the one note of Moe being so depressed he can’t even muster the energy to end it all. An episode that actually depicted a suicide would at least win points for going to extremes."

Teresa Lopez of TV Fanatic gave the episode two and a half stars out of five, saying "In addition to the Moe and Lisa plots, the show also tried to shoehorn another story involving Grampa and Bart bonding when Grampa gets injured on Bart's makeshift waterslide. There were some cute moments between the two, but the episode had far too many threads going to make any of them really satisfactory."

=== Ratings ===
The episode received a 1.9 in the 18–49 demographic and was watched by a total of 4.43 million viewers. This made it the third most watched show on Fox's Animation Domination line up that night.
