= Frisky Business =

Frisky Business may refer to:

== In television ==
=== Series ===
- Animals at Work, a Canadian documentary series about animals, also called Frisky Business
- Frisky Business (UK show), a documentary series about the adult toy company Lovehoney

=== Episodes ===
There have been episodes titled "Frisky Business" on a number of television series, including:

- 101 Dalmatians: The Series, a Disney animated series
- An American in Canada, a Canadian sitcom
- Betsy's Kindergarten Adventures, an American cartoon on PBS
- City Guys, an American sitcom
- Doogie Howser, M.D., an American comedy-drama series
- Hardcore Pawn, an American reality series
- Kid vs. Kat, a Canadian animated series
- Out of This World (TV series), an American sitcom
- Titans (U.S. TV series), a soap opera
- The Tom and Jerry Show (2014 TV series), an animated series
- T.U.F.F. Puppy, an American animated series

== Other uses ==
- Frisky Business, a romance novel by Vicki Lewis Thompson with Tracy South
- "Frisky Business", a song on the album Turf Wars by Daggermouth

== See also ==
- Risky Business, a 1983 American comedy film starring Tom Cruise
- Risky Business (disambiguation)
- Kinky Business, a 1985 pornographic film based on the 1983 comedy
