= Roger T. Pipe =

American journalist

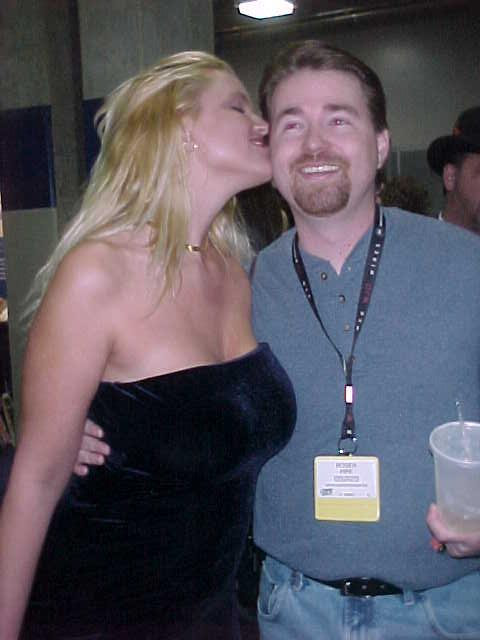
- Pipe (right), with pornographic actress Trinity, at the AVN Adult Entertainment Expo, Las Vegas, Nevada, January 2000
- Born: October 17, 1967 (age 58); California, United States
- Other name: Rog T. Pipe
- Website: http://www.rogreviews.com

Roger T. Pipe (born October 17, 1967) is an American pornographic film critic, adult radio commentator, and occasional writer and director who resides in California. Pipe operates the website RogReviews which hosts reviews of movies, sex toys, and websites involving the adult entertainment industry, as well as audio and text interviews with stars, directors, and other important figureheads. He is an active member of the X-Rated Critics Organization and a member of the XRCO Hall of Fame as of 2009. He has been quoted and referenced in books like Necroculture by Charles Thorpe (Springer Publishing, 2016), Violence and the Pornographic Imaginary by Natalie J. Purcell (Routledge, 2012), The Aesthetics of Degradation by Adrian Nathan West (Watkins Media, 2016) A History of X by Luke Ford (Prometheus Books, 1999) and Il porno di massa by Pietro Adamo (R. Cortina, 2004).

== Personal life ==
Pipe was born in October 1967 and grew up in San Marcos in southern California. He went to Cal-State Fullerton and graduated with a degree in communications. In his interviews he said that he has a wife for 15 years who supports him watching porn, and has children.

== Career ==
Pipe began watching pornography consistently in 1985. It wasn't until 1995, while doing a search on the internet for a rare porn title, that he stumbled across a website where individuals were discussing and reviewing pornographic titles. After several days, Pipe decided that he would try his own luck by reviewing movies from his private collection, writing "from the heart of a porn fan." The response was seemingly overnight, and soon, Pipe's reviews were being included on distributor websites to establish a more personal connection with those buying the videos.

Eventually, Pipe launched RogReviews in 1998, intending only to showcase his reviews, a decision made partially in retaliation against the Adult Video News Awards, for which he had briefly worked for. The experience left Pipe jaded against the more mainstream avenues, but has since worked out to be "very beneficial." Pipe has said in interviews that the same individual who dismissed him (Mark Kulkis) has ensured Pipe's accessibility to every major film premiere for the companies he represents, suggesting that while the way in which they parted was not ideal, there was still a level of respect for Pipe's work. RogReviews was used as a source in books like Controversial Images by Feona Attwood et al. (Palgrave Macmillan, 2013), Violence and the Pornographic Imaginary by Natalie J. Purcell (Routledge, 2012), La piel en la palestra II by Alba del Pozo García and Alba Serrano Giménez (Editorial UOC, 2011), Beyond Explicit by Helen Hester (SUNY Press, 2014), Getting Off by Robert Jensen (South End Press, 2007) and Medical Women and Victorian Fiction by Kristine Swenson (University of Missouri Press, 2005).

During the early years of the site's launch, Pipe also had a day job as a warehouse and office manager for a local software company. At this time, Pipe also worked on several amateur scripts, the most hugely popular being "Guilty Pleasures," which Pipe failed to receive credit for in the final cut. By 2002, Pipe began including sex toy and website reviews, enticing outside free-lance reviewers to contribute, the most prolific of which is midwestern college student Savana Switzer.

In 2005, Pipe joined The Daily Noise, an uncensored entertainment radio talk show broadcast out of Las Vegas, hosted by spin jocks Kaan Soler and Jimmy Diggs, as a weekly guest commentator. The Daily Noise folded in late August 2007, signaling the end of a successful three-year run. Prior to the Daily Noise, Pipe also had a number of appearances on the radio show "Lovebytes," hosted by Dr. Bob Berkowitz on Eyada.com, and had been in the process of negotiating a deal for his own news show when Eyada went off the air.

Earlier this year, Pipe introduced interviews with industry members through podcasts, a decision which has increased his site's exposure considerably. In addition to the podcasts, his site also offers textual transcripts of the interviews, galleries of industry giants and amateur fans, and a wide selection of reviews of websites and sex toys.

=== Views on the industry ===
Despite being at the heart of the industry, Pipe grapples with the implications of porn in regards to the long-term effects it can have on its stars, urging aspiring actors and actresses to be absolutely sure they want to get involved in adult entertainment. However, Pipe maintains he is one of the most open-minded in the business, believing that "all women, in all shapes, sizes and ages should be appreciated by the men who appreciate them. As far as perfect sizes, I’m the wrong guy to ask. My idea of perfect varies from woman to woman…I find beauty in just about every shape and size."

Pipe has also voiced his frustration about the treatment of women within the industry, criticizing many as being hurt by the "Jackassization," (a term referring to the MTV show, "Jackass," which popularizes a group of individuals performing dangerous—and arguably, degrading—stunts for laughs and shock effect) of many of the industry's most popular films.

Following the outbreak of HIV among five actors (beginning with Darren James) in the spring of 2004, Pipe expressed his disappointment that the advent of the Internet had opened up the door for anyone to shoot, which can exclude those involved from being in safe, professional environments and circumstances. He did, however, commend the industry for avoiding replicating the mistakes of the previous outbreak in 1999 (where Tricia Devereaux and Brooke Ashley were blamed for "venturing outside the industry" until it was revealed that the infected "Patient X" was actually star Mark Wallice) and for companies such as Platinum X covering the cost to continually test their talent.

=== Professional relationships and disputes ===
Pipe admits to sustaining several "professional crushes," the most publicized of which has been aughties starlet Aurora Snow. More recently, he's referred to Shay Jordan as his 'next ex-Mrs. Rog'. He also reveres former adult superstar Christy Canyon, who starred in many porn movies during the 80's, identified as his "first porn crush." He's also expressed that his favorite stars of all-time are Kaitlyn Ashley and Tom Byron.

However, Pipe has also been at the heart of several controversies in the adult entertainment industry, including a public feud with director Skeeter Kerkove. Skeeter Kerkove was abusive, and often spoke poorly of Pipe.

Pipe has also had some public exchanges regarding former adult film superstar, Asia Carrera. However, when Carrera's husband, nutritionist and author Don Lemmon died in a car crash in June 2006, Pipe solicited his readers for financial and emotional support for the grieving Carrera.
