= Shades of Hades =

- DVD released by Extreme Associates
- Directed by: Thomas Zupko
- Written by: Thomas Zupko
- Produced by: Thomas Zupko
- Starring: Veronica Caine; Mickey G.
- Edited by: Slain Wayne
- Music by: Glennlyn
- Production company: Extreme Associates
- Distributed by: Extreme Associates
- Release date: June 13, 2001 (United States)
- Running time: 96 minutes
- Country: United States
- Language: English

Shades of Hades is a 2001 American pornographic film written and directed by Thomas Zupko and produced and distributed by Extreme Associates. It stars Veronica Caine and Mickey G., the latter as Mickey, a troubled man who experiences surreal visions during a walk through the desert after a session with his therapist, played by Caine.

== Plot ==
When he was a child, Mickey fell out of a tree, permanently injuring one of his legs and causing him to be bullied by other children, including his crush, who gave Mickey the cruel nickname "Peg Leg." Mickey's crush later rejected him when he asked her to the prom, and these youthful incidents, coupled with his religious grandmother drilling misogynistic beliefs into him to make him more dependent on her, have caused emotional distress for Mickey. After a session with his therapist, Mickey drives out to the desert, where he has sex with a vision of his childhood crush, who appears before Mickey as a human-tree hybrid while proclaiming, "You know, I never told you, but I always loved you."

Mickey was married once, but the relationship fell apart, partly due to the toxic influence of Mickey's grandmother, and as Mickey's vision quest in the desert continues, he happens upon a domestic tableau, where a phantom version of Mickey's ex-wife has sex with a younger version of Mickey. Mickey's ex-wife mutilates her breasts with a hot clothes iron and is drenched in blood spewed by a disused sink after she receives a facial from the young Mickey.

In college, Mickey impregnated three girls, one of whom had an abortion; a warped, gory version of the medical procedure is performed on a young version of Mickey's grandmother, who attempts to seduce Mickey while the abortion doctor shrieks, "Your grandmother's a whore, Mickey!" In the desert, the three blood-covered co-eds are connected via umbilical cords to Mickey's crucified grandmother, who is freed from her cross by Mickey. The co-eds chew through their umbilical cords and have an orgy with three men, Mickey's grandmother, and Mickey.

After flashing back to moving out of his grandmother's home, Mickey visits his grandmother's grave, where he has a breakdown before being approached by the younger version of his grandmother, who comforts Mickey. Mickey has sex with his grandmother, who afterward turns back into her aged self and begins taunting and insulting Mickey. Mickey is crucified and treks through the desert with the cross while, in reality, he is revealed to be passed out on a sidewalk, being worked on by a pair of EMTs. A passerby apathetically flicks his cigarette butt onto the unconscious or dead Mickey.

== Cast ==
- Veronica Caine as Therapist/Mickey's Grandmother
- Mickey G. as Mickey
- Allysin Embers as Co-ed #1
- Milena as Co-ed #2
- Kristi Love as Mickey's Ex-Wife
- Brian Surewood as Young Mickey/Orgy Participant/Paramedic #1
- Jack Hammer as Orgy Participant
- Mr. Pete as Orgy Participant
- Chuy Bravo as Clown
- Axl Hose as Abortion Doctor
- Smiley Johnson as Paramedic #2
- Lynkoln Townekharr as Smoking Bystander
- Shay Sights as Mickey's Crush/Co-ed #3

== Production ==
According to director Thomas Zupko, when it came to crafting Shades of Hades, he "put everything into that one" because it was "more or less" based on Zupko's own life, with Zupko having stated, "I think in many ways I am [...] the Mickey G. character in Shades of Hades." Zupko found shooting the film to be an exhausting and "powerful" experience that left him contemplating suicide, which prompted him to take "a couple of weeks off" as he "wondered where I could go from there."

== Reception ==
Nina Whett and Scott Cohen of Adult Industry News had differing views on Shades of Hades, with the former calling it "interesting" and praising its technical aspects and "artistic vision" while the latter criticized the film's pacing and expressed revulsion over aspects like the grandmother character and the abortion scene, labelling the film "genuinely artistic" but concluding, "I've seen other Zupko films and they have been great. However, this one will have you fast-forwarding a lot." Peter van Aarle of Cyberspace Adult Video Reviews expressed disdain for Shades of Hades, giving it a score of 6.00/10.00 (the lowest one possible) and rhetorically asking, "Sorry, I thought this was a sex tape?" Roger T. Pipe was somewhat critical of the film's sex scenes but otherwise complimentary towards it, declaring, "What can I say, Shades of Hades is well crafted, twisted, nicely shot, disturbing and occasionally brilliant" before awarding the film a score of 8/10.

ViceList admitted that, despite its repetitive nature, Shades of Hades was the only one of Thomas Zupko's "masterpieces" that they enjoyed, highlighting the editing and special effects, and stating, "He [Zupko] manages to keep the religious bullshit and heavy-handed messages to a minimum, focusing on a completely fictitious story and slowly but surely developing a character. There's something to be said for that." Neil B. of XXX Movie Review labelled the film a "unique piece of cinema" that was "thoughtful, well directed and riveting" and deserving of a score of 5/5, despite also opining that Shades of Hades was not technically pornography due to the sex and eroticism feeling secondary to the "story and presentation."

Shades of Hades won Best Anal Sex Scene (Video) and Most Outrageous Sex Scene (Video) at the 2002 Adam Film World Awards and the Ninfa Award for Best Script at the 2002 Barcelona International Erotic Film Festival.
