= Taboo (film series) =

Pornographic film series

Taboo is a pornographic movie series, beginning in 1980 until 2007. It stars Honey Wilder and Kay Parker among others, and was directed by Kirdy Stevens among others. The earlier and well-known entries are known for eroticizing father-daughter and mother-son incest, although later entries explored themes considered "taboo" for its time such as LGBTQ sex, anal sex, BDSM, and interracial sex.

== Films ==
- Taboo (1980)
- Taboo 2 (1982)
- Taboo 3 - The Final Chapter (1984)
- Taboo 4 - The Younger Generation (1985)
- Taboo 5 - The Secret (1987)
- Taboo 6 - The Obsession (1988)
- Taboo 7 - The Wild And The Innocent (1989)
- Taboo 8 - The Magic Is Back (1990)
- Taboo 9 (1991)
- Taboo 10 - Ten Years Later (1993)
- Taboo 11 - Crazy On You (1994)
- Taboo 12 (1994)
- Taboo 13 (1994)
- Taboo 14 - Kissing Cousins (1995)
- Taboo 15 (1995)
- Taboo 16 - But Not Sweet (1996)
- Taboo 17 (1997)
- Taboo 18 - Her Secret Life (1998)
- Taboo 19 (1998)
- Taboo 2001 - Sex Odyssey (2002)
- Taboo 21 - Taboo 212 (2004)
- Taboo 22 (2006)
- Taboo 23 (2007)

== Awards ==
Year	Award	Category	Actor/Actress	Film
1985	AFAA Award	Best Supporting Actor	John Leslie	Taboo 5
1987	AVN Award	Best Total Sexual Content - Film		Taboo 4
1987	XRCO Award	Best Supporting Actress	Amber Lynn	Taboo 5
1989	AVN Award	Best Music - Film		Taboo 6
2002	AVN Award	Best Anal Sex Scene - Film	Nicole Sheridan and Voodoo	Taboo 20
2002	AVN Award	Best Overall Marketing Campaign - Film		Taboo 20
	XRCO Hall of Fame	induction		Taboo

== Memoirs ==
- Kay Parker: Taboo: Sacred, Don't Touch — a book in which she talks about her past career in adult movies and her experiences with the metaphysical.
