= Electric Blue (TV series) =

British pornography television show

- Electric Blue
- Starring: Various
- Country of origin: United Kingdom
- No. of episodes: 57

Production
- Running time: 60 min.

Original release
- Network: Playboy Channel
- Release: 1979 – 1987

Electric Blue is a series of softcore pornographic videos that were produced in the UK in the 1980s. They subsequently aired on the Playboy Channel. Many prominent porn stars performed on Electric Blue, including Ginger Lynn, Traci Lords, Marilyn Chambers, Christy Canyon, Sasha Gabor, Blake Palmer, Janey Robbins,, Eileen Daly, and Rick Savage. Hustler centrefold model and "scream queen" actress Gail Harris made appearances in many episodes.

Electric Blue: The Movie (1981) is a film compèred by the US pornographic star Marilyn Chambers. It consists of a compilation of clips from the Electric Blue home video series. These include sketches, erotic songs, lesbian fantasies and a nude disco dancing competition. There are also film clips showing archive nude footage of celebrities such as Marilyn Monroe, Joanna Lumley and Jacqueline Bisset, as well as Jayne Mansfield's naked bath scene from the film Promises! Promises! (1963). Electric Blue: The Movie was released theatrically in the UK in March 1982 under an X certificate and on VHS in 1983 as a tie-in to the Electric Blue video releases.

== History ==
In 1979, the home video market in the UK was in its early stages of development and was dominated by cheap exploitation films available from rental shops, Electric Blue was launched in December of that year with the cost of £31. Described as "the UK’s first men’s magazine on video", Electric Blue was an hour-long compilation of "video centrefolds" intercut with acquired film footage. A new instalment of Electric Blue was released about every three months. The full-colour video magazines were sold in the form of X certificate videotapes in UK shops alongside more conventional films. They were produced under a commercial relationship with Paul Raymond, a publisher of "top shelf" men's magazines, including Men Only and Club International. Raymond also owned the Raymond Revuebar, a striptease club in Soho, London. The Electric Blue videos were an extension of his magazines into new media, making use of his existing magazine models. They presented images of women in a glamour photography style that was far from explicit, showing little more than breasts and pubic hair. The videos were also on sale in Australia. The Electric Blue series came to an end in the mid-1980s. Playboy entered the cable television market in the early 1980s and the videos were shown on the Playboy Channel between 1983 and 1987.

== Distribution ==
It appeared on home video releases in North America, Australia, New Zealand in the early to mid-1980s.

Electric Blue was derived from the UK and were a subsidiary of the Video Classics group of labels in Australia. After that company ended, Electric Blue films were released by Virgin Video. Then, in the mid-1990s, they were distributed by Columbia TriStar.

The versions released on home video in North America differed from the UK versions, adding localized content and a greater emphasis on American porn stars.

The type of films released by this company consisted of female centrefolds, nudity and sexual situations.

== Episodes ==
- Electric Blue 1 (1979) Fiona Richmond, Long Dong Silver, Marilyn Chambers
- Electric Blue 2 (1981) Joanna Lumley, Marilyn Chambers
- Electric Blue 3 (1982)
- Electric Blue 4 (1982) Seka
- Electric Blue 5 (1982) Marilyn Chambers, Michelle Bauer
- Electric Blue 6 (1981)
- Electric Blue 007 (1982) (James Bond themed video)
- Electric Blue 8 (1982)
- Electric Blue 9 (1982)
- Electric Blue 10 (1984) Dee Booher, Veronica Hart, Ginger Lynn
- Electric Blue 11 (1984)
- Electric Blue 17 (1984) Crystal Breeze, Venus DeLight
- Electric Blue 19 (1984)
- Electric Blue 20 (1985)
- Electric Blue 21 (1985)
- Electric Blue: Beverly Hills Wives (1985) Christy Canyon, Ricky Diamond
- Electric Blue 22 (1985)
- Electric Blue 24 (1985)
- Electric Blue 26 (1985)
- Electric Blue 27 (1985)
- Electric Blue 30 (1985) Michelle Bauer, Robin Cannes
- Electric Blue 31 (1985)
- Electric Blue 33 (1985)
- Electric Blue 34 (1986) Lois Ayres, Robin Cannes, Gina Carrera
- Electric Blue 35 (1986)
- Electric Blue 36 (1986)
- Electric Blue 37 (1986)
- Electric Blue 38 (1986) Careena Collins, Samantha Fox, Gail Harris
- Electric Blue 39 (1986)
- Electric Blue 40 (1986)
- Electric Blue 41 (1986) Blondi, Gail Harris
- Electric Blue 42 (1986)
- Electric Blue 43 (1986) Blondi, Careena Collins, Gail Harris
- Electric Blue 44 (1986)
- Electric Blue 45 (1986)
- Electric Blue 46 (1987)
- Electric Blue 47 (1987) Gail Harris, Ginger Lynn
- Electric Blue 48 (1987) Gina Carrera, Careena Collins, Gail Harris
- Electric Blue 49 (1987) Michelle Bauer, Careena Collins, Gail Harris
- Electric Blue 50 (1987) Aja, Careena Collins, Gail Harris
- Electric Blue 51 (1987)
- Electric Blue 52 (1987)
- Electric Blue 53 (1987)
- Electric Blue 55 (1987) Tracey Adams, Barbii
- Electric Blue 56 (1987)
- Electric Blue 57 (1987)
