= Pulpit Friction =

- The Simpsons episode
- Episode no.: Season 24; Episode 18
- Directed by: Chris Clements
- Written by: Bill Odenkirk
- Production code: RABF11
- Original air date: April 28, 2013

Guest appearance
- Edward Norton as Rev. Elijah Hooper

Episode features
- Couch gag: The Simpsons are skydiving. Homer's parachute breaks and he and the rest of the family crash into the house and fall onto the couch, which breaks the couch. The couch gag then segues to the episode.

Episode chronology
← Previous "What Animated Women Want"	Next → "Whiskey Business"
- The Simpsons season 24

"Pulpit Friction" is the eighteenth episode of the twenty-fourth season of the American animated television series The Simpsons, and the 526th episode overall. The episode was directed by Chris Clements and written by Bill Odenkirk. It originally aired on the Fox network in the United States on April 28, 2013. The name is a pun on the film Pulp Fiction.

In this episode, Reverend Lovejoy leaves after a new minister joins the church while Marge tracks down her wedding dress with Lisa. Edward Norton guest starred as Reverend Elijah Hooper. The episode received positive reviews.

== Plot ==
After crashing onto the couch from the couch gag, the Simpsons decide to get a new couch, but before Marge can go to the store, Homer orders a new couch online from Brooklyn, New York. The new couch is infested by bedbugs and soon Springfield is overrun with them. As Reverend Lovejoy is unable to calm the town, the Parson (last seen on "Moe Letter Blues") demotes Lovejoy and promotes a new reverend named Elijah Hooper (Edward Norton). The town begins to appreciate Hooper and the cultural references he makes in his sermons.

Hooper and Homer bond and Hooper suggests that Homer could be the new church deacon. Homer accepts, but Bart starts to miss all father-son time with him, and turns to Ned Flanders who is still angry and devastated after Lovejoy left. They visit Lovejoy, who now works as a hot tub salesman, but he says he does not want to come back. Bart, with Milhouse's help, manages to procure some of the dead bedbugs, which he gives to frogs to induce a plague in the town. The frogs begin to invade the town, and Hooper is confronted by the angry townspeople when he is unable to do anything except talk about movies or music. Lovejoy makes an entrance with a speech to ease the plague, and happily accepts his post back after his voice makes the frogs fall asleep.

Meanwhile, while deinfesting her clothes, Marge finds that her wedding dress has been switched with one of Krusty's costumes. She admits that she was saving the dress for Lisa to wear at her own wedding; and is upset when Lisa says she cannot picture herself ever getting married. Marge confronts the clown who tells her that he no longer has the dress, having tossed it in the trash after using it for a skit on his show. However, Lisa manages to track down the dress's whereabouts: after being retrieved from the trash and being used during a production of Mamma Mia!, it was sold to an engaged couple during a bankruptcy sale. Lisa then takes Marge to the couple's wedding ceremony, where she is touched upon seeing the couple's nuptials. Lisa assures her that she may consider getting married in the future.

== Production ==
Executive producer Al Jean described the episode as having a similar story to the 1944 film Going My Way.

In August 2012, Entertainment Weekly reported that Edward Norton would guest star as a reverend. Jean described the character as "lovable," and he forms a rivalry with Reverend Lovejoy. Norton previously appeared as a different character in the twelfth season episode "The Great Money Caper."

== Reception ==
=== Critical reception ===
Robert David Sullivan of The A.V. Club gave the episode a B, saying "The two things that are still usually enjoyable in the show’s 24th season are musical numbers and stories about Springfield under siege."

Rob H. Dawson of TV Equals said "Is ‘Pulpit Friction’ the first time a couch gag has led directly into the plot of an episode on The Simpsons? I don't have an encyclopedic knowledge of the series, but it certainly feels unique; And the opening segment, all stemming from that broken couch, is a lot of fun. It's basically an extended montage of the bedbugs spreading across town."

Teresa Lopez of TV Fanatic gave the episode three out of five stars, saying "Other than a rather useless subplot involving Marge's missing wedding dress, this week's installment was fairly enjoyable with some great The Simpsons quotes."

=== Ratings ===
The episode received a 2.1 in the 18-49 demographic and was watched by a total of 4.54 million viewers. This made it the second most watched show on Fox's Animation Domination line up that night.
