= Kisses and Caroms =

2006 film by Vincent Rocca

- Directed by: Vincent Rocca
- Written by: Vincent Rocca; Michael Hutchinson
- Produced by: Michael Hutchinson; Jay Beeber; Vincent Rocca
- Starring: Ginger Lynn Allen; Nikki Stanzione; Nicole Rayburn; Drew Wicks; Ryan Parks
- Cinematography: Alfonso Aguilar
- Edited by: Vincent Rocca
- Music by: Tim Daoust
- Production company: PovertyWorks
- Distributed by: Warner Bros. Polychrome Pictures
- Release date: August 22, 2006
- Running time: 81 minutes
- Country: United States
- Language: English
- Budget: $11,000

Kisses and Caroms is a 2006 American independent comedy film that was shot in five days for a budget of $11,000, which went on to gross over $1 million through Warner Bros. The film is available in Greece, Russia, Hong Kong, Thailand, and Brazil. It was also released by 20th Century Fox under the title American Pool in Australia and New Zealand.

== Plot ==
Jen and Tara arrange a threesome to win Jen's ex-boyfriend back, but things don't go quite as planned. He still believes their relationship is best left as friends. Through the antics of offbeat characters at the billiard pro shop where they all work, he comes to realize Jen is his dream girl, but is it too late?
