= Risky Business (disambiguation) =

Risky Business is a 1983 American film.

Risky Business may also refer to:

== Film ==
- Risky Business (1920 film), a 1920 American silent film starring Lillian Lawrence
- Risky Business (1926 film), a 1926 American film starring Vera Reynolds
- Risky Business (1939 film), a 1939 American film
- Risky Business (soundtrack), from the 1983 film
- Risky Business, the English title of the French 1967 film Les risques du métier
- Kinky Business, a 1985 pornographic-film variation on the 1983 film's plot

== Television ==
- "Risky Business" (A Different World), a 1989 episode
- "Risky Business" (Doctors), a 2004 episode
- "Risky Business" (House), a 2011 episode
- "The Risky Business", a 2005 episode of The O.C.
- "Risky Business", an episode of The Ascent of Money: A Financial History of the World
- "Ricksy Business", a 2014 episode of Rick and Morty
- "Ruskie Business", an episode of Veronica Mars

== See also ==
- Frisky Business (disambiguation)
- Risky Business, a climate change awareness project chaired by Michael Bloomberg and Henry Paulson
