= Porndemic =

- Film poster
- Directed by: Brendan Spookie Daly

Production
- Producers: Brendan Spookie Daly; Evan Krauss

Original release
- Network: Showtime
- Release: December 7, 2018

Porndemic is a 2018 documentary film about an HIV outbreak within the pornography industry in California's San Fernando Valley, during the 1990s. The film premiered on Showtime. It was directed by Brendan Spookie Daly and features interviews with several porn actors and actresses, including Sharon Mitchell, Tricia Devereaux, Ron Jeremy, William Margold, Tom Byron, and Marc Wallice.

== See also ==
- HIV/AIDS in the United States
- STDs in the porn industry
