= A Perfect Fit (2005 film) =

- Mini-theatrical poster
- Directed by: Ron Brown
- Written by: Ron Brown
- Produced by: G. Mac Brown; Ron Brown; Alexander Klymko; Elana Pianko
- Starring: Adrian Grenier; Leila Arcieri; Polly Draper; Victoria Rowell
- Cinematography: Learan Kahanov
- Edited by: Joe Hobeck
- Music by: Michael Montes
- Production company: Primary Process Productions
- Distributed by: Warner Bros. Polychrome Pictures
- Release date: 2005
- Running time: 85 minutes
- Country: United States
- Language: English

A Perfect Fit is a 2005 American thriller film written and directed by Ron Brown. The film is produced by Primary Process Productions and stars Adrian Grenier, Leila Arcieri, Polly Draper, Victoria Rowell. It was distributed by Warner Bros. and Polychrome Pictures.

== Premise ==
A mentally unstable young man suffering from horrific nightmares finds that his nightmare has just begun when he meets the woman of his dreams.

== Cast ==
- Adrian Grenier as John
- Leila Arcieri as Sarah
- Polly Draper as Dr Weiss
- Victoria Rowell as Sheila
- Michele Santopietro as Pat
