= Porn Block of Fame =

Walk of Fame honoring members of the pornography industry

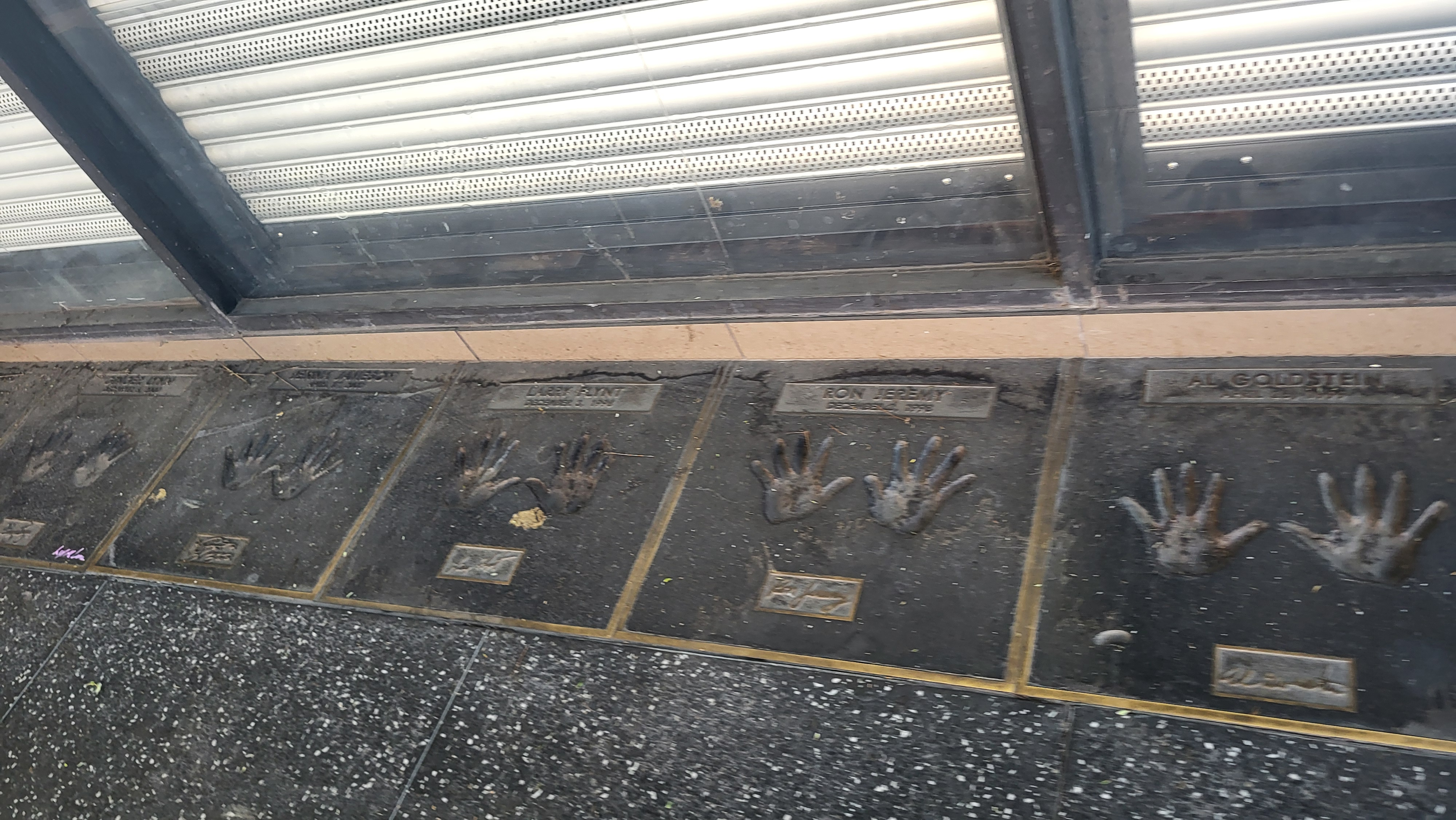
- Five of the walk's plaques, 2025

- Location in Los Angeles
- Established: December 3, 1998
- Location: 6540 Hollywood Boulevard, Hollywood, California, U.S.
- Coordinates: 34.1135°N 118.3319°W
- Founder: Hustler

The Porn Block of Fame is a walk of fame located alongside the Hollywood Walk of Fame at 6540 Hollywood Boulevard in Hollywood, California. It was created by Hustler and honors members of the pornography industry.

== History ==
The Porn Block of Fame was originally located at 8920 W. Sunset Boulevard in West Hollywood, California, at the entry to Hustler's flagship store. The Block of Fame was unveiled on December 3, 1998, less than a year after the store's opening. Larry Flynt, Marilyn Chambers, and Ron Jeremy attended the unveiling.

Both the Porn Block of Fame and Hustler Store moved to 6540 Hollywood Boulevard in Hollywood, California in 2016, after Gwyneth Paltrow bought the original location and kicked the business out. The Porn Block of Fame reopened on April 9, 2016.

== Honorees ==
Honorees in the Porn Block of Fame include:

December 3, 1998

- Marilyn Chambers
- Larry Flynt
- Ron Jeremy

April 26, 1999

- Seka
- Al Goldstein

December 6, 2000

- Ginger Lynn
- Herschel Savage

January 17, 2002

- Gloria Leonard
- William Margold

June 20, 2002

- Sunset Thomas
- Jimmy Flynt

April 17, 2003

- Jenna Jameson

October 29, 2003

- Porsche Lynn
- Harry Mohney

January 15, 2004

- Sharon Mitchell
- Jeff Stryker

March 10, 2005

- Nina Hartley
- Randy Spears

March 10, 2006

- Veronica Hart
- Eric Edwards

July 26, 2007

- Christy Canyon
- Paul Thomas

March 22, 2012

- Belladonna
- John Stagliano

== See also ==
- List of Halls and Walks of Fame
