= Marc Wallice =

American pornographic actor (born 1959)

- Born: Marc Stephen Goldberg; October 3, 1959 (age 66); U.S.

Marc Wallice (born Marc Stephen Goldberg; October 3, 1959) is a former American pornographic actor. He performed in over 1,700 pornographic films and has directed as well. Wallice was inducted into both the AVN and XRCO Halls of Fame.

He tested HIV positive in 1998 after allegedly hiding his HIV positive status for two years and infecting at least four women, sending shockwaves throughout the porn industry.

He left the industry but later returned as a director, editor, and writer.

== Career ==
Wallice entered the porn industry in 1982 at the age of 22. He was working as a grocery store bagger when he answered an ad for the World Modeling Agency. He started out with non-speaking roles, but worked his way up to become a very active actor, doing more than 1,300 heterosexual movies. One of his first films was a gay pornographic film called "A Matter of Size."

Since 1982 Wallice has appeared in productions for studios such as 4-Play Video, Anabolic Video, Caballero Home Video, CDI Home Video, Elegant Angel, Evil Angel, Filmco, Legend Video, Leisure Time Entertainment, Sin City, VCA Pictures, VCA Picturesidco, Vivid Entertainment, Wicked Pictures, and the Zane Entertainment Group.

Wallice was also featured on the HBO documentary series about the adult industry Real Sex in 1998 and in the documentary Porndemic (2018).

In 2003, he returned to the industry as a director.

=== HIV ===
On April 30, 1998, the then-head of AIM Medical, Sharon Mitchell, announced that Wallice was HIV positive. Wallice's career as a performer was effectively over and there were rumors and speculation that he intentionally hid his HIV positive status with fake blood work through several HIV testing cycles to continue working, and consequently infected several actresses, including Brooke Ashley (a.k.a. Anne Marie Ballowe), Tricia Devereaux, Caroline, and Kimberly Jade. Doubts of this speculation were investigated using Wallice's tests.

After his HIV positive status became public, Wallice announced his intention to go back to school to learn computer programming.

== Awards ==
- 1990 AVN Best Group Sex Scene – Video for Gang Bangs II
- 1992 XRCO Best Actor (Single Performance) for House of Sleeping Beauties
- 1993 AVN Best Group Sex Scene – Video for Realities 2
- 1993 XRCO Male Performer of the Year (Body of Work)
- 1998 AVN Best Couples Sex Scene – Film for Red Vibe Diaries
- AVN Hall of Fame
- XRCO Hall of Fame

== See also ==
- List of male performers in gay porn films
