= William Margold =

American pornographic film actor and porn film director

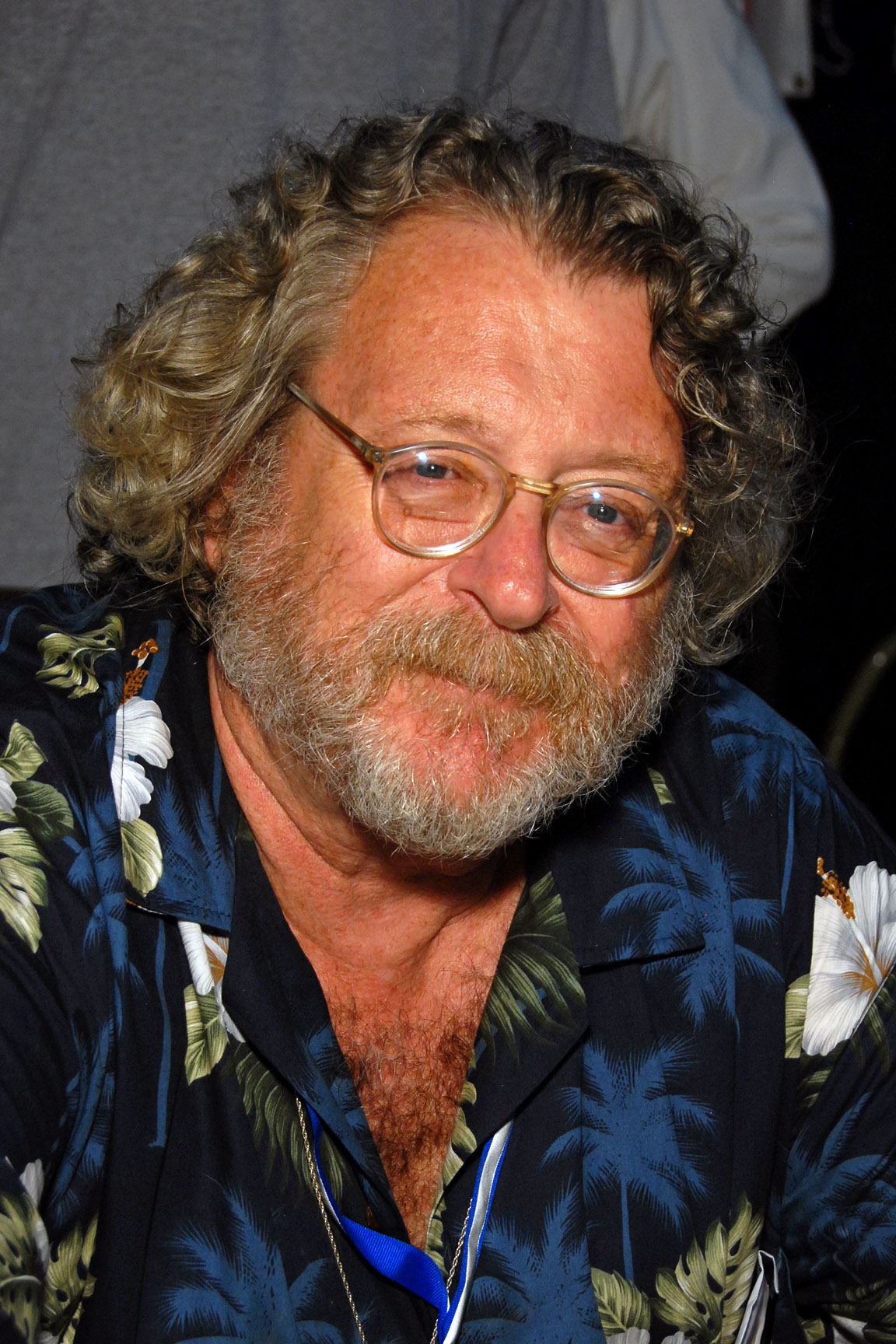
- Bill Margold in Los Angeles, 2011
- Born: October 2, 1943; Washington, D.C., U.S.
- Died: January 17, 2017 (aged 73); Los Angeles, California, U.S.
- Occupations: Pornographic film actor; porn film director
- Height: 6 ft 2 in (1.88 m)

William Margold (October 2, 1943 – January 17, 2017) was an American pornographic film actor and porn film director.

Known as Bill Margold, he was a former director of the Free Speech Coalition and was a co-founder of X-Rated Critics Organization (XRCO) and Fans of X-Rated Entertainment (FOXE). He was the founder of PAW Foundation, the charity for the welfare of pornography industry performers. He was also a member of the AVN Hall of Fame. He was at one time married to the 1980s porn film actress Drea. A frequent news and talk show guest, Margold appeared in scores of documentaries throughout his career, including the 2012 documentary After Porn Ends, which is about life after being in the porn industry. He also appeared posthumously in the 2018 documentary Porndemic. He was the son of Nathan Ross Margold.

== Controversy ==
Margold generated considerable controversy in January 1981, telling journalist Rona Barrett in an interview aired during the initial broadcast of NBC's Tomorrow Coast-to-Coast with Tom Snyder, that he would consider performing a sex scene with his own daughter. When asked if he would allow his daughter to enter the porn business, Margold replied "Not until she's 18. And then I might even work with her myself." Ever the provocateur, Margold made similar statements on at least one previous occasion, during the taping of the adult film documentary What Would Your Mother Say? In the wake of the Barrett controversy, Margold ran an advertisement in Variety apologizing for the comments. An outspoken activist for industry reforms, Margold supported initiatives at the state level to raise the legal age of performers from 18 to 21 in the wake of the Traci Lords incident.

== Death ==
Margold died of a heart attack whilst hosting a radio show on 17 January 2017, at the age of 73.

== Awards ==
Margold is included in the Porn Block of Fame.
