= What Animated Women Want =

- The Simpsons episode
- Episode no.: Season 24; Episode 17
- Directed by: Steven Dean Moore
- Written by: J. Stewart Burns
- Production code: RABF08
- Original air date: April 14, 2013

Guest appearances
- Bryan Cranston as Walter White; Maurice LaMarche as Sushi Chef; Aaron Paul as Jesse Pinkman; Wanda Sykes as School Therapist; George Takei as Akira; Marcia Wallace as Edna Krabappel

Episode features
- Couch gag: Special intro in homage to Breaking Bad. The camera zooms out at the end to reveal the live-action characters of Walter White and Jesse Pinkman sitting on a couch drinking beer and watching the show on TV.

Episode chronology
← Previous "Dark Knight Court"	Next → "Pulpit Friction"
- The Simpsons season 24

"What Animated Women Want" is the seventeenth episode of the twenty-fourth season of the American animated television series The Simpsons, and the 525th episode overall. The episode was directed by Steven Dean Moore and written by J. Stewart Burns. It first aired on the Fox network in the United States on April 14, 2013. The name is a take on that of the film What Women Want.

In this episode, Homer tries to win back Marge with sex toys when he fails to be romantic while Lisa becomes interested in Milhouse when he acts poorly towards her. The couch gag is a parody of the television series Breaking Bad, including live-action appearances by Bryan Cranston and Aaron Paul reprising their roles from the series. Maurice LaMarche, Wanda Sykes, and George Takei also guest starred. The episode was watched by 4.11 million viewers and received mixed reviews.

== Plot ==
Homer and Marge have a lunch date at an up-market sushi restaurant. Marge is excited at the opportunity to have 'grown up people' conversations as the kids are not with them, but Homer is only interested in eating. Enraged, Marge storms out of the restaurant. A worried Homer tries to fix his problems with Marge by finishing a to-do list from within his wallet that Marge had given him. Marge is disappointed because the list is from 6 years earlier. Homer returns to the Japanese restaurant and is given relationship advice by the head chef. Homer takes some food from the restaurant back home and offers it to Marge. She is almost impressed but becomes unhappy when Homer eats the food himself. Unsure of what to do, Homer goes to Moe's Tavern and talks to Moe about his marriage problems. Moe suggests winning her back by exciting her with sex, specifically sadomasochistic sex, as used in Fifty Shades of Grey. Homer goes to the local sex shop where he purchases an array of different sex devices. When he shows Marge all that he has bought she is confused and unimpressed. Homer sits down on one of the machines by mistake and is injured by it. He is taken to the hospital and while he is being treated they reconcile. Afterwards they return home and set all the sex items on fire; Marge admits that she was too hard on him as she says that no matter what he will try to make things right.

Meanwhile, Milhouse is sitting with Bart in the Springfield Elementary School cafeteria. He looks at Lisa and hopes that she will come up to him. She begins to approach him and he becomes excited, but she has only come to the table to tell Bart that Marge had mixed up their lunches. She asks Milhouse if she can eat his cupcake. Having just seen A Streetcar Named Desire for a class assignment, Milhouse takes on the personality of Marlon Brando, and is rude and dismissive towards her, refusing her request for the cupcake. This causes him to win Lisa's respect. Confused as to why his new tactic works, he continues this to keep Lisa interested in him. Seeking answers as to if it is okay to pretend to be someone he is not, he approaches the school counselor (Wanda Sykes). Before she can give him an answer she receives a call notifying her she has been fired. Shocked, she tells Milhouse that he should continue pretending to be who he is not, because his regular personality is boring. Feeling as though he is betraying his character he throws cupcakes (the same from earlier on in the episode) at Lisa's window. He apologizes for pretending to be someone he is not and they feel happier.

== Production ==
The couch gag is a parody of a montage that occurs in the episode "Gliding Over All" from the television series Breaking Bad, including a title card in the style of the Breaking Bad title card. Like the original montage, the gag is set to the song "Crystal Blue Persuasion" by Tommy James and the Shondells. The gag ends with the camera zooming out of a television to show a live-action Walter White and Jesse Pinkman, the main characters from Breaking Bad, sitting on the couch watching Marge.

Bryan Cranston and Aaron Paul reprised their roles of Walter White and Jesse Pinkman, respectively from Breaking Bad. Cranston previously appeared as a different character in the twenty-third season episode "The Spy Who Learned Me." Wanda Sykes guest starred as a school therapist. George Takei appeared as a sushi chef. Takei previously appeared on the show as different characters.

== Reception ==
=== Ratings ===
The episode received a 1.8 in the 18–49 demographic and was watched by a total of 4.11 million viewers. This made it the third most watched show on Fox's Animation Domination line up that night, beating The Cleveland Show and Bob's Burgers but losing to both American Dad! with 4.23 million and Family Guy with 5.02 million.

=== Critical reception ===
The episode received mixed reviews from critics.

Robert David Sullivan of The A.V. Club gave the episode a C+, saying "This is a scattershot episode with a lot of pop-culture references but little comic momentum."

Teresa Lopez of TV Fanatic gave the episode three and a half stars out of five, saying "Despite the hilarious sight gags and funny The Simpsons' quotes, I felt humor of the episode was undercut by the odd narration. It seemed unnecessary as framing device as it didn't really add anything to the story."

Rob H. Dawson of TV Equals said "The sushi restaurant portion of “What Animated Women Want” felt lazy too, mixing together Asian stereotypes and some vague notion of rude fancy restaurants into a less-than-hilarious mess, the only highlight being the alternate universe in which anime pieces of sushi go on an adventure in Santa's Little Helper’s intestines, which I actually liked, one piece of something fun in the middle of an otherwise lackluster The Simpsons."
