= Polychrome Pictures =

- Industry: Entertainment
- Headquarters: Sherman Oaks, California, United States
- Products: Motion pictures

Polychrome Pictures, LLC, now defunct, was headquartered in Sherman Oaks, California, as a distributor of independent motion pictures on DVD, video on demand, and through digital distribution.

Polychrome's independent film business in North America was primarily conducted through Warner Home Video. However, after losing the Warner Bros. deal, Polychrome struck a home video output deal with Vivendi Entertainment.

The company's principals included Eugene 'Geno' Taylor, Arnold 'Arnie' Holland, Wayne Cox and Danny Rodriguez.

== Bankruptcy ==
Polychrome Pictures, LLC filed a Voluntary Petition for a Chapter 7 Bankruptcy in the United States Bankruptcy Court Central District of California on November 22, 2009.

According to the Bankruptcy Petition #: 1:09-bk-25696-KT, Polychrome's assets were $423,476.00, with liabilities of $1,178,125.15. The petition also lists Polychrome's gross income as:

- 2007 gross income - $2,826,937.00
- 2008 gross income - $1,497,784.00
- 2009 gross income - $440,746.00

== Titles ==
- Mate (2010)
- El cártel (2009)
- Destination Fame (2009)
- The Eddie Black Story (2009)
- Game: Life After the Math (2008)
- Big Pun: The Legacy (2008)
- On Bloody Sunday (2007)
- The Homies Hip Hop Show (2007)
- Grindin' (2007)
- Living the Still Life (2007)
- The Still Life (2007)
- June Cabin (2007)
- The Weekend (2007)
- Para matar a un asesino (2007)
- Stompin' (2007)
- Americanizing Shelley (2007)
- Hip Hop Legends (2007)
- One Long Night (2007)
- Dreamland (2007)
- Fallen Angels (2006)
- Aces (2006)
- Laura Smiles (2006)
- How to Go Out on a Date in Queens (2006)
- My Brother (2006)
- Alien Secrets (2006)
- Unconscious (2006)
- Delivery (2006)
- Love Hollywood Style (2006)
- Kisses and Caroms (2006)
- Blood of a Champion (2006)
- Premium (2006)
- Loyalty & Respect (2006)
- Street Muzik (2006)
- Marcus (2006)
- Restraining Order (2006)
- Clash (2006)
- God's Waiting List (2006)
- Lockout (2006)
- South Beach Dreams (2006)
- Whiskey School (2005)
- These Girls (2005)
- So Fresh, So Clean... a Down and Dirty Comedy (2005)
- The Big White (2005)
- Red Doors (2005)
- A Perfect Fit (2005)
- Jacqueline Hyde (2005)
- Habana Blues (2005)
- Constellation (2005)
- Love, Ludlow (2005)
- Confessions of a Thug (2005)
- The Salon (2005)
- Lost (2004)
- Voces inocentes (2004)
- On the Outs (2004)
- Last Goodbye (2004)
- Close Call (2004)
- Raising Genius (2004)
- Playas Ball (2003)
- One Last Ride (2003)
- Errors, Freaks & Oddities (2002)
- Bill's Gun Shop (2001)
- Dead Broke (1998)
