= The Fabulous Faker Boy =

- The Simpsons episode
- Episode no.: Season 24; Episode 20
- Directed by: Bob Anderson
- Written by: Brian McConnachie; Tom Root (couch gag)
- Production code: RABF12
- Original air date: May 12, 2013

Guest appearances
- Justin Bieber as himself; Bill Hader as Slava; Jane Krakowski as Zhenya; Patrick Stewart as Nuclear Power Plant Worker

Episode features
- Chalkboard gag: "The school is not falling apart" (the blackboard crumbles)
- Couch gag: In a stop-motion gag animated by the Robot Chicken crew, Homer wakes up and realizes he is an action figure and can do multiple things, such as firing his fists as projectiles and transforming into a donut. He then decides to get into a race with Otto and they both drive extremely fast. Homer ends up catapulting the family into the Simpson living room, where the chicken from Robot Chicken awaits.

Episode chronology
← Previous "Whiskey Business"	Next → "The Saga of Carl"
- The Simpsons season 24

"The Fabulous Faker Boy" is the twentieth episode of the twenty-fourth season of the American animated television series The Simpsons, and the 528th episode overall. The episode was directed by Bob Anderson and written by Brian McConnachie. It originally aired on the Fox network in the United States on May 12, 2013. The name is a pun on The Fabulous Baker Boys.

In this episode, Bart takes piano lessons, and Marge pays for it by teaching the instructor's father how to drive while Homer loses his last two hairs. Bill Hader, Jane Krakowski, and Patrick Stewart are credited as guest stars, and Justin Bieber appeared as himself. The episode received mixed reviews.

== Plot ==
Marge attends a parent-principal conference with Principal Skinner, who tells her that Bart might be able to improve his academic performance by taking up a musical instrument. Marge takes Bart to several potential instructors - Sideshow Mel, Comic Book Guy, and Professor Frink - but he ridicules all of them. He becomes infatuated with a young Russian woman named Zhenya, who agrees to give him piano lessons in exchange for Marge teaching her father how to drive so that he can get a driver's license. While Marge makes little progress with Zhenya's father's dangerous habits, word of Bart's rapid progress and emerging musical ability quickly spreads, leading to Zhenya gaining many more students. However, it later emerges that he has only been miming in time with a CD that he has secretly slipped into a player mounted beneath the piano. Feeling neglected because Zhenya has very little time for him due to her other students, Bart publicly confesses to his deception during a talent show. Marge is enraged and disappointed in him until Zhenya's father tells her that he has obtained his license - not by passing the test, but by bribing Patty and Selma with jeans. He also convinces Marge to go easy on Bart as he only cheated for love and for his mother. Marge forgives Bart, saying she is proud of him for having told the truth and assuring him that he is unique and it will work out for him in the future.

Meanwhile, Homer loses the two last hairs on his head and becomes totally bald. He tries to hide it by using different hats and a wig, but these attempts only draw further attention to him. One worker at the power plant, who is also bald, inspires Homer with confidence by describing all the exciting experiences he has undergone since losing his hair. Homer tells Marge that he has gone bald; she comforts him, and the hairs spontaneously grow back. (Frédéric Chopin's "Polonaise in A-flat major, Op. 53" is played on piano during the closing credits.)

== Production ==
=== Development ===
This is the first episode written by Brian McConnachie. McConnachie was invited to write an episode after a joke from him was used in a prior episode.

The couch gag was created by Stoopid Buddy Stoodios, which produces the television series Robot Chicken. Executive producer Al Jean stated that guest animators have wide creative latitude, and the only requirement is that a couch must appear.

=== Casting ===
In August 2012, musician Justin Bieber announced that he would appear on the show, which was later confirmed by executive producer Al Jean. Jean stated that creator Matt Groening requested that Bieber be added to an episode because he was a fan of Bieber. Bieber also asked to be on the show when he met Groening. The producers considered adding an alert before and after his appearance, which was included in the final cut of the episode. Bieber's guitarist and musical director Dan Kanter and his manager Scooter Braun also appear in non-speaking roles.

Bill Hader guest starred as a foreign character named Slava. Jane Krakowski appeared as a Russian piano teacher named Zhenya. Patrick Stewart guest starred as a vigorous older man. Stewart previously appeared as a different character in the sixth season episode "Homer the Great."

== Reception ==
=== Critical reception ===
This episode received mixed reviews from critics.

Robert David Sullivan of The A.V. Club gave the episode a C−, saying that "the relationship between Marge and Bart is actually one that hasn’t been done to death on The Simpsons, but it comes up too half-heartedly and is resolved too quickly in this episode."

Teresa Lopez of TV Fanatic gave the episode two and a half stars out of five, saying that "Not only was the mother-son dynamic shoved into the narrative late in the game, but Marge's disappointment was easily waived away by her Russian driving student saying Bart cheated for love and for his mother. Kind of a simple rationalization, right? The B-plot involving Homer's loss of his last two hairs did lead to some hilarious The Simpsons quotes and an amazing guest appearance by Patrick Stewart (one of the sexiest and most confident bald men), but it was mostly a distracting vehicle that allowed Homer to try on various hats."

=== Ratings ===
The episode received a 2.0 in the 18-49 demographic and was watched by a total of 4.16 million viewers. This made it the second-most watched show on Fox's Animation Domination line up that night.
