= Buried Alive (1990 theatrical film) =

- Theatrical release poster
- Directed by: Gérard Kikoïne
- Screenplay by: Jake Chesi; Stuart Lee
- Story by: Edgar Allan Poe
- Produced by: Harry Alan Towers
- Starring: Robert Vaughn; John Carradine; Donald Pleasence
- Cinematography: Gerard Loubeau
- Edited by: Gilbert Kikoïne
- Music by: Frederic Talgorn
- Production companies: Breton Film Productions; The Movie Group
- Distributed by: 21st Century Film Corporation
- Release date: October 3, 1990
- Running time: 87 minutes
- Countries: United States; South Africa
- Language: English
- Budget: $12 million

Buried Alive (also known as. Edgar Allan Poe's Buried Alive) is a 1990 horror film, directed by Gérard Kikoïne and based on the work of Edgar Allan Poe. It stars Robert Vaughn, Donald Pleasence and John Carradine. This film is one of Nia Long’s earliest roles. The script was based on the works of Edgar Allan Poe. The film marks Carradine's final performance and is dedicated to his memory.

== Plot ==
At the Ravenscroft Institute, an all-girl school for juvenile delinquents, several girls go missing as they are assaulted by a man in a Ronald Reagan mask, who drags them to the basement of the school and immures them into darkened chambers to die a slow and agonizing death by way of entombment. Janet, a new teacher, arrives at the school and becomes a target of the killer.

== Cast ==
- Robert Vaughn as Gary Julian
- Donald Pleasence as Dr. Schaeffer
- Karen Witter as Janet
- John Carradine as Jacob
- Ginger Lynn Allen as Debbie (as Ginger Allen)
- Nia Long as "Fingers"
- Arnold Vosloo as Ken Wade

== Production ==
Buried Alive was John Carradine's final film, who died in 1988. Filming took place in the country of Botswana in Southern Africa.

== Release ==
As with the other three Harry Alan Towers productions inspired by Poe, Buried Alive was released direct-to-video in the United States.

On March 15, 2011, MGM released the film on DVD-R format through its MGM Limited Edition program.

== Reception ==
In a contemporary review, Variety described the film as browsing through several themes of Edgar Allan Poe with "dull results". The review noted the historical footnote of the film being the final film featuring Carradine, but noted that it disappoints as "there's only a few seconds of blurry Carradine footage." The review noted that audiences may be disappointed that Karen Witter remains clothed throughout the film, while noting that former porn actress Ginger Lynn "has one of her best mainstream jobs as a tough-talking inmate who proves to be an excellent screamer."
