= Girl on Fire =

Girl on Fire or Girls on Fire may refer to:

== Books ==
- "The Girl on Fire", a name used to refer to the Hunger Games character Katniss Everdeen
- Edie: Girl on Fire, a 2007 biography of Edie Sedgwick
- Girls on Fire, a 2016 novel by Robin Wasserman

== Music ==
- Girl On Fire (band), a rock band from Seattle, Washington
- Girl on Fire (album), a 2012 album by Alicia Keys
  - "Girl on Fire" (song), a 2012 song by Alicia Keys from the album
- "Girl on Fire", a song by Rob Zombie on his 2003 album Past, Present & Future
- "Girls on Fire", song by Nadine from Nadine (EP)
- Girls on Fire, band from X Factor (Poland series 3)

== Other ==
- Girls on Fire, a 1984 pornographic film directed by Jack Remy.
