= Kinky Business =

- Directed by: Jonathan Ross
- Written by: Jerry Ross
- Release date: 1984
- Running time: 85 minutes
- Country: United States
- Language: English

Kinky Business is an American pornographic movie takeoff of the mainstream film Risky Business. It stars Tom Byron in the Tom Cruise role, and Tanya Lawson in the Rebecca De Mornay part. Others stars include Ginger Lynn, Misty Mallory, Laurie Smith, Lois Ayres, Jerry Butler, Raven, Crystal Breeze, Cynthia Brooks and Gina Carrera. Ron Jeremy and (uncredited) Kristara Barrington are featured in non-sex roles. Traci Lords had one scene in the film. After it was revealed that Traci Lords was underage at the time of production, the film was re-released without her sex scene. A scene with Lynn and Byron won the 1985 AVN Award for Best Couples Sex Scene.

== Plot ==
Tom Byron plays virgin teenager Matt Russell who daydreams a lot. He has a crush on Gloria, (Ginger Lynn), the girl next door who likes teasing him by swimming naked. He falls asleep with headphones on and dreams of going over to Gloria's one day, she points at his erection then tells her mom. Gloria's mom (Laurie Smith) is not angry, instead she seduces him in her bedroom. Matt wakes to his parents who are going on a trip. His dad warns him to avoid his older brother Vince (Jerry Butler), who's been barred from the house. Matt dreams that Vince convinces him to secretly watch a girl. The girl finds out but Matt wakes up to the sound of the doorbell.

Vince sends over a call girl named Angel (Tanya Lawson), who instructs the inexperienced Matt how to pleasure women. The two have feelings for each other, and the next day, they devise a plan to open a brothel, so he could repay for her services.

Vince sees a naked woman (Lois Ayres) dancing seductively next door but she rejects him when he goes over. Vince sees her again but ignores her the second time. When Matt invites him over and he sees two hookers, (Renee Tiffany and Crystal Breeze) doing a lesbian show for Albert (Ron Jeremy). Albert leaves with one (Breeze), Vince hooks up the other one (Tiffany).

Matt confidently starts wearing sunglasses and smoking cigars. He gets jealous when Vince makes a pass at Angel. He goes over to Gloria's house but she's angry at not being invited to his "party". She leaves, but he follows her into her bathroom. Gloria's turned on by his newfound confidence. He's upset after believing Vince and Angel hooked up. He forgot that his economics tutor Laura (Lois Ayres) was coming over. He finds out that nothing happened between his brother and Angel because she likes him. Vince meets Laura, and realizes she's the naked woman who rejected him. She succumbs to his persistence.

Matt eagerly clears the house as his parents return in a few hours. He sees Tracy (Traci Lords), whose customer didn't show up. He tells her about his parents but she has other ideas, eventually putting him in the mood. After everyone leaves Angel stays behind. She wants him to come with her but he declines, telling her does not have the money to support himself. His parents arrive and ask if she's his tutor. "Just a friend", he says. Angel overhears the news that Matt's uncle left his entire estate to him. The movie cuts to Matt asleep outside. Off screen, his mom tells him and she and his father are leaving for a few days to take care of his sick uncle.

== Scene breakdown ==
Scene 1	Laurie Smith, Tom Byron
Scene 2	Tanya Lawson, Tom Byron
Scene 3	Crystal Breeze, Renee Tiffany
Scene 4	Renee Tiffany, Jerry Butler
Scene 5	Misty Regan
Scene 6	Raven, Steve Drake
Scene 7	Ginger Lynn, Tom Byron
Scene 8	Traci Lords, Tom Byron
Scene 9	Lois Ayres, Jerry Butler
