= Tricia Devereaux =

American pornographic actress (born 1975)

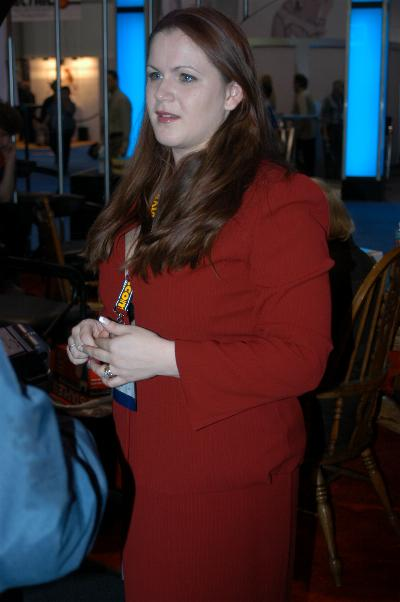
- Devereaux at the 2005 AVN Adult Entertainment Expo
- Born: January 12, 1975 (age 51); Illinois, U.S.
- Other names: Trica Devoroux; Tricia Devero; Tricia Deveraux; Trisha Devereaux; Karen Clark; Karen Stagliano
- Occupation: Pornographic actress
- Height: 5 ft 7 in (170 cm)
- Spouse: John Stagliano (m. 2008)

Tricia Devereaux (born January 12, 1975) is an American former pornographic actress, XRCO Hall of Fame inductee, and co-owner of Evil Angel studios.

== Career ==
Devereaux was introduced to the adult industry when her then-husband, Patrick, got a job working as a bouncer in a strip club and Devereaux would occasionally visit him there. The other dancers encouraged her to enter the club's amateur contest which she won; this led to her working there to make extra money. A number of established porn stars visited the club as feature dancers—names such as Victoria Paris, Jeanna Fine, and Samantha Strong.

Seeing the extra money that the features made, Devereaux sent pictures of herself to Hustler magazine for their "Beaver Hunt" feature, which was published. At the same time Devereaux came in fifth in Déjà Vu's national Stripper of the Year. She then flew out to Los Angeles at Joey Silvera's request (he had seen pictures Devereaux had sent of herself to Jim South), where she made her first on-camera scene with Silvera in Fashion Sluts 7.

In 1998, Devereaux was infected with HIV during a scene with Marc Wallice.

Now known as Karen Stagliano, she is also the co-owner of Evil Angel, a production company, with her husband John Stagliano.

== Awards ==
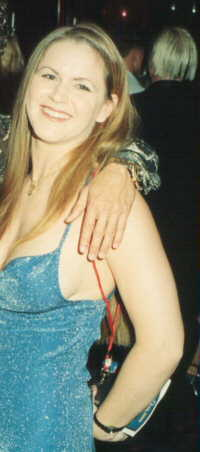
Devereaux during her performing days

- 1998 AVN Award - Best All-Girl Sex Scene, Video (Cellar Dwellers 2) with Jeanna Fine & P.J. Sparxx
- 2003 AVN Award - Best Editing, Film (The Fashionistas) with John Stagliano
- 2011 XRCO Hall of Fame inductee

== Personal life ==
Devereaux grew up "in a small town a couple of hours outside of Chicago," where she had a strict upbringing and attended a private Catholic high school.

She attended college in the Midwest, got her bachelor's degree in biology from a college in Missouri, then attended one year of medical school. Before starting medical school, she had married her boyfriend Patrick. After she had appeared in a number of films, Devereaux was dismissed from medical school after the school accused her of cheating on a test; Devereaux claims the charge was rigged and that the real reason she was dismissed was due to her involvement in pornography. Soon afterwards, Devereaux divorced her husband; she later said that "Patrick was too much of a pushover personality-wise, and we'd been having problems financially."

She married former porn star and current director John Stagliano on November 26, 2008. She now is known as Karen Stagliano.
