= Kay Parker =

English pornographic film actress (1944–2022)

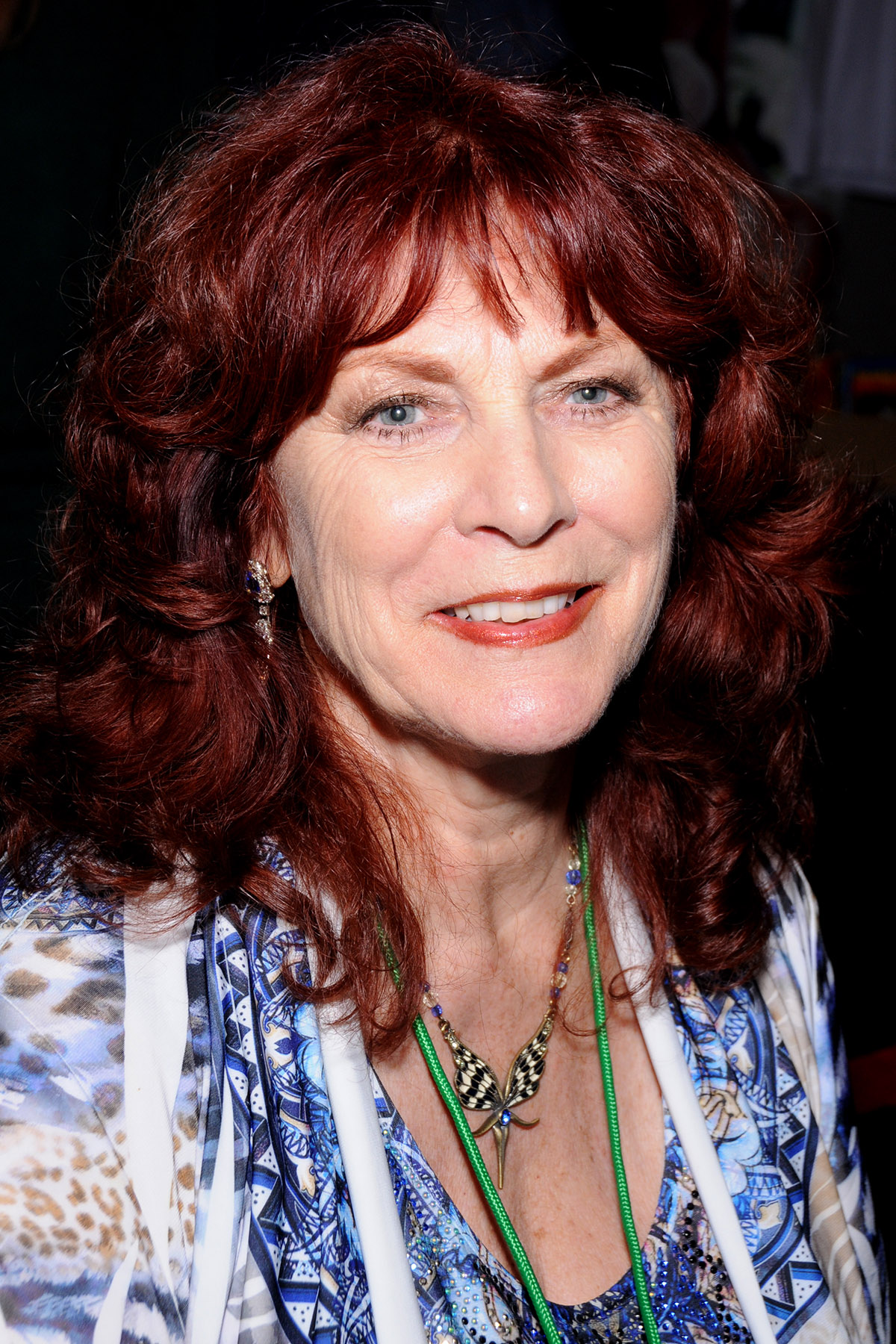
- Parker in 2014
- Born: Kay Taylor Parker; 28 August 1944; Birmingham, England
- Died: 14 October 2022 (aged 78); Los Angeles, California, U.S.
- Other names: Kay Taylor; Kay Parker; Kay Taylor Parker
- Citizenship: United Kingdom; United States
- Occupations: Pornographic film actress; metaphysical counselor; mentor
- Years active: 1962–1999
- Height: 5 ft 6 in (1.68 m)

Kay Taylor Parker (28 August 1944 – 14 October 2022) was a British pornographic film actress who later worked as a metaphysical counselor and mentor. She was the author of an autobiography Taboo: Sacred, Don't Touch which chronicles her life including her work as an actress in adult films.

== Early life ==
Born in England, her given birth name was Kay Taylor, she grew up in a conservative household. She moved to the United States at the age of 21. After moving to the United States, she had a successful career in the import business. While living in San Francisco, she became interested in acting and began studying drama.

== Career ==
Parker was reportedly introduced to the adult film industry during the late 1970s by actor John Leslie, who suggested she take part in one of his upcoming films. She made her first appearance in 'V' – The Hot One in a non-sex role. Soon afterwards, porn director Anthony Spinelli talked her into doing her first sex scene in Sex World (1977). Despite entering the adult film industry at a later age than most, she became a leading star in the field and was often paired with younger co-stars. Typically she was cast in mature woman roles, such as mothers, step mothers, rich aunts, and wealthy divorcees. She is best known for her roles in Dracula Sucks (1978) and the 1980 film Taboo. She retired from porn in the mid-1980s and for a time worked for Caballero Home Video as their public relations representative. She also appeared in small parts in several mainstream movies and television series, such as The Best Little Whorehouse in Texas.

=== Later years ===
In 2001, Parker wrote her autobiography titled Taboo: Sacred, Don't Touch: An Autobiographical Journey Spanning Six Thousand Years in which she wrote about her early childhood, her career in the adult industry, and her experiences with the metaphysical. A revised version, Taboo: Sacred Don't Touch – The Revised Version was published in 2016. She later had a YouTube channel where she answered questions in her videos from her fans on myriad subjects on spirituality and spiritual exercises for personal individual growth. She also offered personal Skype sessions with clients who paid her for spiritual counseling.

Parker is the subject of the documentary A Taboo Identity, which chronicles her transition from pornstar to metaphysical counselor.

=== Death ===
Parker died in Los Angeles on October 14, 2022, at the age of 78. Her family did not reveal the cause of her death.

== Awards ==
- 1983: Adult Film Association of America Award Best Supporting Actress for Sweet Young Foxes
- 1984: Golden Age of Porn Walk of Fame
- 1985: XRCO Special Merit Award
- AVN Hall of Fame
- 1990: XRCO Hall of Fame
- 1990: Free Speech Coalition Lifetime Achievement Award

== Publications ==
- Parker, Kay Taylor (2016). Taboo: Sacred, Don't Touch – The Revised Version. Blurb. ISBN 9781367411531.
