= Christy Canyon =

American pornographic film actress (born 1966)

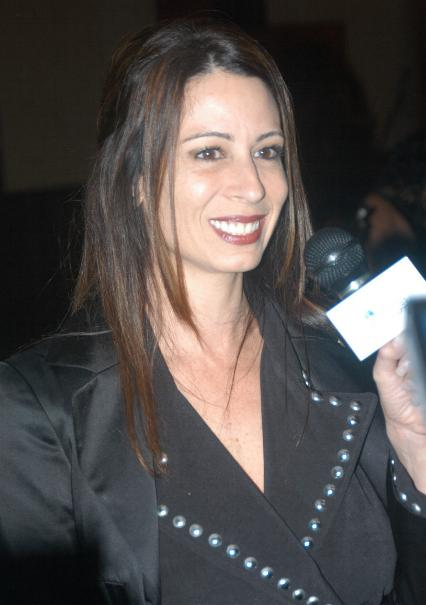
- Canyon in 2006
- Born: June 17, 1966 (age 60)
- Occupations: Pornographic film actress; radio personality
- Years active: 1984–present

Christy Canyon (born June 17, 1966) is an American pornographic film actress and radio personality. She is a member of both the AVN Hall of Fame and XRCO Hall of Fame and a recipient of the Free Speech Coalition Lifetime Achievement Award.

== Career ==
=== Adult film career ===
Canyon has performed in over 100 pornographic films. She performed from September 1984 to March 1985; June 1989 to December 1992; and 1995 to 1997 (as an exclusive contract performer for Vivid Entertainment). She also appeared in photo spreads for Penthouse and Swank magazine.

In her autobiography, Canyon stated that pornographic film actor Greg Rome approached her while she was waiting for a ride in Hollywood, and told her that she would be a terrific figure model. He gave her the business card of adult magazine and film recruiter and agent Jim South, of World Modeling Agency. After visiting South's office, Canyon posed for men's magazines and began her video career shortly thereafter. Her first on-screen performance was with Ron Jeremy in 1984's Swedish Erotica 57. She has stated that Jeremy soon afterward became a close friend in the business.

=== Retirement and return ===
Canyon retired from performing in pornographic films in 1997. She remained active in related fields, hosting Playboy Radio's Night Calls and selling memorabilia on eBay. She has also managed her own X-rated website and self-published an autobiography titled Lights, Camera, Sex (2004).

In 2005, she appeared as a judge on the first season of Jenna's American Sex Star. From 2005 to 2011, she was co-host of the Playboy Radio show Night Calls. As of April 2011 she was co-host of SiriusXM's Spice Sex Circus with Ginger Lynn and sole host of Sirius XM's weekly Legends of Porn.

Canyon was interviewed for the ABC News program Nightline in 2010 for the series Modern Sex in America. She co-hosted Radio Sex's You Porn on Sirius/XM Channel 102, until October 2013 when the channel went off the air. In December 2013, she became the host of The Christy Canyon Show on Vivid Radio on Sirius/XM Channel 102.

Canyon joined OnlyFans in 2017. In 2024, she collaborated on a pornographic scene with Elaina St. James. Also in 2024, Vixen Media Group announced that Canyon would make adult video content for its MILFY website.

== Recognition ==
Canyon has won several industry awards and is a member of both the XRCO Hall of Fame and AVN Hall of Fame.

She was namechecked by English electronic band Orchestral Manoeuvres in the Dark (OMD) on their 1993 track "Heaven Is", in the line: "Heaven is Christy Canyon falling in love with me".

== Personal life ==
Canyon has been married and divorced three times. She is the mother of two adopted children.

== Awards ==
- 1991 XRCO Female Performer of the Year
- 1991 F.O.X.E. Female Fan Favorite
- 1992 F.O.X.E. Female Fan Favorite
- 1995 XRCO Hall of Fame
- 1996 AVN Best Tease Performance for Comeback
- 1997 AVN Best Group Scene – Film for The Show
- 1997 Legends of Erotica Hall of Fame
- 1998 AVN Special Achievement Award
- AVN Hall of Fame
- 2004 Free Speech Coalition Lifetime Achievement Award
- 2007 Porn Block of Fame
- 2008 AEBN VOD Lifetime Achievement Award
- 2018 Vivid Hall of Fame
- 2025 XMA Best Sex Scene – Comedy Movie for American MILF

== Filmography ==
Titles listed are standalone films, not compilations.

- Bardot (1992)
- Battle of The Stars (1985)
- Behind the Scenes (1991)
- The Best of Christy Canyon (Video Exclusives) (1990)
- Big Busty 8 (1986)
- Big Busty 10 (1986)
- Big Melons Vol. 3 (1985)
- Black Throat (1985, 2000)
- Christy in the Wild (1992)
- Comeback (1995)
- The Coming of Christy (1990)
- Confessions of Christy (1990)
- Crazed (1992)
- Crazed 2 (1992)
- Diamond Collection 65 (1985)
- Diamond Collection 67 (1985)
- Dirty Letters (1985)
- Dirty Shary (2006)
- Doctor Desire (1984)
- Domination Nation (1997)
- Domination Nation Two (1997)
- The Dreams of Candace Hart (1991)
- Educating Mandy (1985)
- Electric Blue 19 (1985)
- Electric Blue 20 (1985)
- Electric Blue 28 aka Electric Blue: Beverly Hills Wives (1985)
- The Enchantress (1985)
- Erotica Jones (1985)
- Evil Angel aka Working Girls (1985)
- Fantasies Unltd. (1985)
- Fantasy in Blue (2001)
- Flesh and Ecstasy (1985)
- Gang Bangs (2002)
- Get Off with Christy Canyon aka Get Off (1990)
- Ginger on the Rocks (1985)
- Harlequin Affair (1985)
- Holly Does Hollywood (1985)
- Holly Does Hollywood 4 (1990)
- Hot in the City (1989)
- Hypnotic Sensations (1985)
- I Dream of Christy (1989)
- I Dream of Ginger (1985)
- I Like to be Watched (1984)
- It's My Body (1985)
- The Jubilee of Eroticism (1985)
- The Legends of Kama Sutra aka Kama Sutra (1992)
- Kiss of the Gypsy (1985)
- Kissin' Cousins (1984)
- The Ladies in Lace Party aka Ladies in Lace (1985)
- Like a Virgin (1985)
- Little Girls of the Streets (1984)
- Marilyn Chambers' Private Fantasies 6 (1986, 1987)
- A Mid-Slumber's Night Dream (1985)
- Spellbound / Mistress of Seduction (1990)
- NightBreed (1996)
- Night of Loving Dangerously (1984)
- On Golden Blonde (1984)
- On Trial 1: In Defense of Savannah (1991)
- On Trial 2: Oral Arguments aka On Trial 2: Witness for the Prosecution (1992)
- One Hot Night of Passion (1985)
- Oral Addiction (1996)
- Orifice Party (1985)
- Passages 1 (1991)
- Passages 2 (1991)
- Passages 3 (1991)
- Passages 4 (1991)
- Perfect Fit (1985)
- Play Christy for Me (1991)
- A Portrait of Christy (1990)
- Pretty in Peach (1992)
- Racquel in the Wild (1992)
- Savage Fury (1985)
- Savage Fury II (1989)
- Sex 2 (1993)
- Sex Asylum 4 (1991)
- Sex Fifth Avenue (1985, 1987)
- The Sex Goddess (1985)
- Sex Secrets of a Mistress (1996)
- The Show (VHS) aka The Sex Show (DVD) (1996)
- Sinfully Yours (1985)
- Sore Throat (1986)
- Star 90 (1990)
- Starlets aka Hollywood Starlets (1985)
- Swedish Erotica 57 (1984)
- Swedish Erotica 58 (1984)
- Tape Busters Vol. 1 (1985)
- 10 Questions: Christy Canyon (1991)
- Then & Now (1995)
- Tracy in Heaven (1985)
- Treasure Chest (1985)
- Twisted (1999)
- Victim of Love (1992)
- Victim of Love 2 (1992)
- Video Tramp (1984)
- Where the Boys Aren't 5 (1993)
- Where the Boys Aren't 6 (1995)
- Where the Boys Aren't 7 (1995)
- Where the Boys Aren't 9 (1997)
- Wild Things aka Alex de Renzy's Wild Things (1985, 1986)
- The Woman in Pink (1984)
- WPINK TV (1984)
- You Make Me Wet (1985)

== Works ==
- Canyon, Christy (2003). Lights, Camera, Sex!: An Autobiography. C. Canyon. ISBN 978-0-9727470-0-4.
