= Kirdy Stevens =

American pornographic film director (1920–2012)

Kirdy Stevens (1920 – October 20, 2012) was an American pornographic film director.

He was inducted into the XRCO Hall of Fame in 2001 and the AVN Hall of Fame in 2003.

Stevens died of pneumonia on October 20, 2012 at age 92. His most acclaimed movie was Taboo.
