= Jim South =

American pornography recruiter and agent

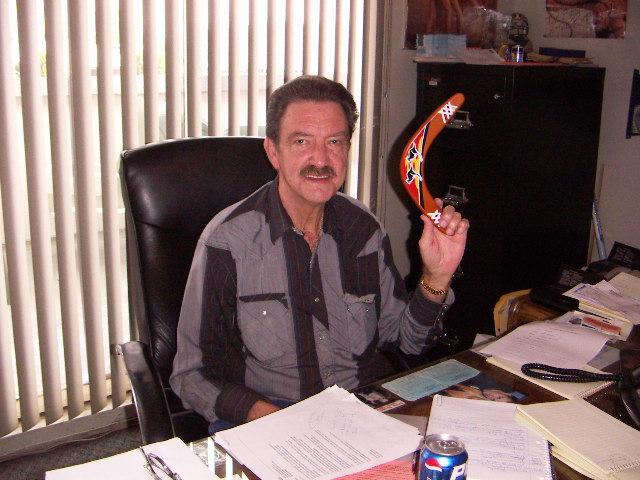
- South in 2005
- Born: James Marvin Souter, Jr. September 17, 1939; Dallas, Texas, U.S.
- Died: August 28, 2020 (aged 80); Thousand Oaks, California, U.S.
- Occupation: Talent agent
- Children: 2

James Marvin Souter, Jr. (September 17, 1939 – August 28, 2020), known professionally as Jim South, was an American recruiter and agent in the pornography industry.

== Early life ==
South sold insurance in Dallas, Texas for a few years and moved to Los Angeles, California in 1968. He opened a fashion modeling agency first, then formed World Modeling Talent Agency in Sherman Oaks, California in 1976. The agency represented many performers and models who worked in adult movies and magazines.

== Career ==
World Modeling became infamous for unknowingly representing a then underaged Traci Lords. Through South's agency, 15-year-old Lords started nude modeling. She had introduced herself with a fraudulent identification card in the name of Kristie Elizabeth Nussman, which falsely showed her age as twenty two years old. Lords became the September 1984 Penthouse "Pet of the Month," for which she earned $5,000, and first performed in pornographic movies in 1984.

Following the May 1986 revelation that most of Lords' porn work was illegal, South was arrested on March 4, 1987, and was among those later charged by the U.S. government with pandering and child pornography. The charges were eventually dismissed after the discovery that the government had issued Lords a passport under the name Kristi Nussman.

In an interview, South said, "The only reason [the charges were dropped] was that the federal government saw the very same ID I saw and gave Traci a passport to go to Europe to make an X-rated movie." That movie, Traci, I Love You, which was made in Cannes soon after Lords' 18th birthday, is her only legal porn film in the United States.

In interviews and her book, Lords held him in perpetual contempt for what she saw as the unapologetic role he and others played in her sexual exploitation. She stated that she named him "Tim North" in her autobiography not for legal reasons but as a means to protect people from him, and to avoid giving him and his company any publicity, which could draw young women into the sex industry. Lords wrote that South gave her cocaine and champagne during her first nude photo shoot at World Modeling, a charge that South denied.

In 1991, porn producers discovered that Alexandra Quinn, a World Modeling talent, had entered porn in 1990 at age 17. Quinn pretended that she was born in 1968, the same year as Traci Lords' birth. Unlike the Lords case, Quinn did not generate a scandal with media coverage, nor did anyone face legal action.

World Modeling went out of business in November 2006 because of declining profits. On December 5, 2007, South announced the reopening of World Modeling with a change of direction, as well as an intent to reduce the number of young women he would represent.

== Business model ==
South's female clients could earn up to $1,500 for a day's work (usually two scenes). Exotic acts, involving multiple partners or "bizarre fetishism" could fetch $3,500. South did not work on percentage basis, but was rather paid $65 a day per performer by the film's producer. In rare cases, when having negotiated an exclusive deal, he would get a cut from the profits.

== Personal life ==
South stated that he maintained a strict "no dating" policy with his clients, preferring his relationship with his talents to be strictly professional. South married his wife in 1975, and he had two sons. He died on August 28, 2020.
