= Howard Ziehm =

American adult film director and producer (1940–2024)

Howard Ziehm (April 7, 1940 – August 26, 2024) was an American director, director of photography, producer, and writer of adult cinema.

Ziehm is regarded as a pioneer in the porn industry. His 1970 film Mona the Virgin Nymph was the first 35mm adult feature film that was nationally released in theaters. He was inducted into the XRCO (X-Rated Critics Organization) Hall of Fame for his work in 1986.

Ziehm's best-known film is Flesh Gordon, a 1974 soft sex spoof of the Flash Gordon serials. It was nominated for a Hugo Award for "Best Dramatic Presentation" in 1975 and is now celebrated as a cult classic. The film is also notable for providing the training grounds for several now-famous special effects artists like Rick Baker, Dennis Muren and Greg Jein; animator Jim Danforth also worked on the film.

== Early life and career ==
Born on April 7, 1940, Ziehm grew up in Jewish family as the oldest of five siblings. He went to high school in Monterey, California, before enrolling at MIT to study engineering and mathematics. He dropped out of college before graduation, however.

In 1961, he moved to Berkeley and opened a folk music club called The Cabale in September 1962. He encountered marijuana and even tried his hand at smuggling drugs, hitchhiked across North America and enjoyed the sexual revolution of the 1960s. He lost his co-ownership of The Cabale and moved to Los Angeles in 1967, where he briefly worked as a carpenter and started a rock band.

He met a business-savvy young man named Bill Osco, who became the manager of Ziehm's short-lived band. Osco wanted to get involved with the movie business, so he and Ziehm founded Graffiti Productions and started making porn loops. Ziehm would direct and shoot the films, Osco would produce and sell them. Since pornography, despite still being illegal, was quickly becoming an in-demand product, Graffiti was successful enough not only to become a sought-after supplier of films, but also to start producing longer, more ambitious films.

After two feature films (What Happened to Stud Flame? and Virgin Runaway), Graffiti made Mona: The Virgin Nymph, which became the first pornographic 35mm feature film to be nationally released in regular theaters and helped start the "porno chic" of the 1970s. Ziehm co-directed the film with Michael Benveniste and served as its director of photography. The film had no credits because the filmmakers didn't want to draw attention to themselves, and since Osco was the one travelling around and selling the movie to theaters, he was sometimes thought of as the director or sole creator of Graffiti's films.

Ziehm and Osco quickly followed up with several other films, including Harlot, City of Sin and Seeds of Lust. Ziehm often credited himself as "Harry Hopper". He would later on use a variety of other names such as "Lynn Metz", "Linus Gator" or "Hans Johnson".

In 1972, Graffiti wanted to produce a more ambitious film: a porn parody of the old Flash Gordon serials called Flesh Gordon. The production was plagued by numerous problems, including a police raid where all the negatives were confiscated, and the budget quickly ballooned from $25,000 to a reported $700,000. During the making of the film, Ziehm had a falling-out with Osco over financial issues, and became the sole owner of Graffiti. Osco would later go on and produce Alice in Wonderland, a sex musical version of the Lewis Carroll tale.

While Flesh Gordon was successful, Ziehm did not want to move into regular, i.e. non-pornographic film work. He struck up a partnership with producer Peter Locke and made six more adult feature films from 1976 to 1981: Sexteen, Honey Pie, Sweet Cakes, Hot Cookies, Star Virgin and Naughty Network. By then, video had replaced film in the production of adult movies, and since Ziehm was not interested in competing with decreasing budgets, he retired from filmmaking - even though he appeared as a performer in Suze Randall's 1984 film Miss Passion.

In 1989, Ziehm returned to the director's chair one more time for a sequel to Flesh Gordon called Flesh Gordon Meets the Cosmic Cheerleaders. The film failed to perform at the box office, and Ziehm retired for good.

== Post-retirement activities ==
After making his last adult feature film Naughty Network in 1981, Ziehm began to focus on other endeavors, including a series of vocabulary training audio cassettes called Wordbank and Wordbuilders.

In the 90's, Ziehm edited two books of historic cartoons. The first, Golf in the Comic Strips, was released in 1997. It collected golf-related cartoons from 1897 to 1995 and featured a foreword by Bob Hope. Two years later, a collection called Lawyers in the Comic Strips followed.

In 2015, Ziehm published his memoirs, Take Your Shame and Shove It: My Wild Journey Through the Mysterious Sexual Cosmos. The book was first released as an ebook, a paperback followed in early 2016.

In March 2015, The Rialto Report released a 99-minute audio interview of Ziehm.

In June 2016, Ziehm started a website called howardziehm.com. The site includes his personal blog ShameBusters where he attacks prudery and prejudices.

In September 2017, director Christian Genzel began production on the documentary Finding Planet Porno, which details Ziehm's life and career. Interviewees include Ziehm himself and Flesh Gordon actors Jason Williams, William Dennis Hunt and Bruce Scott.

Ziehm died on August 26, 2024, at the age of 84.

== Filmography ==
Year	Title	Director	Director of Photography	Writer	Producer	Notes
1970	Whatever Happened to Stud Flame?	X mark				
1970	Virgin Runaway	X mark				
1970	Mona: The Virgin Nymph	X mark	X mark			(uncredited, co-directed with Michael Benveniste)
1970	Hollywood Blue		X mark		X mark	
1971	Harlot	X mark	X mark	X mark	X mark	(as Howard Zeihm, co-directed with Michael Benveniste)
1971	The Daring French Touch	X mark	X mark		X mark	(as Harry Hopper)
1971	Seeds of Lust	X mark	X mark		X mark	(as Harry Hopper and William A. Boedeker)
1971	City of Sin	X mark	X mark		X mark	(as Harry Hopper)
1971	Naked Hunter	X mark	X mark		X mark	(as Harry Hopper)
1972	The Incredible Body Snatchers	X mark	X mark		X mark	(as Harry Hopper and William A. Boedecker)
1972	Tijuana Blue	X mark	X mark		X mark	(as Harry Hopper and William A. Boedecker)
1973	Cop Killers		X mark	X mark	X mark	
1974	Flesh Gordon	X mark	X mark		X mark	(co-directed with Michael Benveniste)
1975	Sexteen	X mark	X mark	X mark	X mark	(credited as Lynn Metz)
1976	Honey Pie	X mark				
1976	Sweet Cakes	X mark			X mark	(credited as Hans Johnson)
1977	Hot Cookies	X mark			X mark	(credited as Albert Wilder)
1979	Star Virgin	X mark	X mark		X mark	(credited as Linus Gator and Thomas Jacques)
1981	Naughty Network	X mark		X mark	X mark	(credited as Linus Gator)
1990	Flesh Gordon Meets the Cosmic Cheerleaders	X mark		X mark		

== Publications ==
- 1997: Golf in the Comic Strips: A Historic Collection of Classic Cartoons. General Publishing, ISBN 1-57544-053-9.
- 1999: Lawyers in the Comic Strips. General Publishing, ISBN 978-1-575441-19-1.
- 2015: Take Your Shame and Shove It: My Wild Journey through the Mysterious Sexual Cosmos. Graffiti Productions, ISBN 978-0692593646.
