= Spelunker (video game) =

1983 video game

- Atari 8-bit box cover
- Developers: MicroGraphicImage; Tamtex & Tose (FC/NES); Irem
- Publishers: MicroGraphicImage; Broderbund; Irem
- Designer: Tim Martin
- Platforms: Atari 8-bit, Commodore 64, NES, Arcade, MSX
- Release: 1983: Atari 8-bit; NA: 1983; Commodore 64; WW: 1984 NES; JP: December 7, 1985; NA: September 1987 Arcade; JP: 1985 MSX; JP: June 10, 1986
- Genre: Platform
- Mode: Single-player

Spelunker is a platform game developed by Timothy G. Martin of MicroGraphicImage and published for Atari 8-bit computers in 1983. It is set in a cave, with the player starting at the cave's entrance at the top. The objective is to get to the treasure at the bottom.

Spelunker was ported to the Commodore 64, then re-released by Broderbund in 1984, with European publishing rights licensed to Ariolasoft. It was released as an arcade video game in 1985, on the Nintendo Entertainment System on December 7, 1985 in Japan and September 1987 in North America, and MSX in 1986. An arcade sequel was released in 1986 as Spelunker II: 23 no Kagi, and a different sequel for the NES on September 18, 1987 called Spelunker II: Yūja e no Chōsen, both by Irem and in Japan only.

== Gameplay ==
Commodore 64 version

The player must walk and jump through increasingly challenging parts of the cave, all while working with a finite supply of fresh air, which can be replenished at various points.

The cave's hazards include bats, which drop deadly guano on the player; and a ghost haunting the cave, randomly appearing to take the player to the shadow world. The player character can send a blast of air to push the ghost away, but this renders the player's character immobile for a few seconds, thus vulnerable to other dangers and further depleting their air supply. Objects to collect include sticks of dynamite, flares, and keys. Precise positioning and jumping are key factors in successfully completing the game.

The cave is divided into six levels. Although the levels connect seamlessly to each other, forming one large map, the game clearly signals a level change at certain points by showing the name of the next level and giving the player a bonus, consisting of an extra life and a varying number of points. Once a player completed all six levels, a new cave will be started with the same layout but with increasing difficulty. There are six caves total. While using the same game and scenery elements, the NES and MSX levels (which are shared with the Wii and 3DS versions) are far smaller than the Atari/C64 levels. The Arcade version uses additional game elements (such as shooting and scuba diving) and has an original level design, and the same is true for Spelunker HD.

Original music theme (Atari 8-bit)

The splash screen of the original Atari version features an excerpt of Modest Mussorgsky's Pictures at an Exhibition as title music. All other versions of the game, including the Atari re-release feature a different title theme. The NES and MSX versions have additional music during gameplay.

== Development ==
MicroGraphicImage was founded by former employees of Games by Apollo, one of the companies that had overproduced games for the Atari 2600, creating a glut of cheap games. In the pre-Christmas market of 1983, Games by Apollo became insolvent, with several games still in development for a number of platforms, including the Atari 8-bit computers. Three former programmers from this company – Tim Martin, Robert Barber, and Cash Foley – subsequently formed MicroGraphicImage. Martin had been previously worked on games for the Atari 2600 and Foley developed for Atari 8-bit computers. When Games by Apollo went into insolvency, Martin and Barber developed a game entitled Halloween, based on the film. The contract funded the founding of MicroGraphicImage. The game was released by Wizard Video Games during the video game crash of 1983 and sold poorly.

Martin and Barber's expertise was with the Atari 2600, and they were dissatisfied with the money being made through contract game development. Their strategy was to utilize the contract programming to leverage the funding of a software publishing company. Cash Foley joined as a technical specialist with Atari and Apple computer programming. At the January 1983 Consumer Electronics Show in Las Vegas, they developed a relationship with Gary Carlson, one of the founders of Broderbund. In early 1983, MicroGraphicImage developed games under contract for Broderbund, Parker Brothers, and CBS Electronics, while developing Spelunker for themselves.

Martin and Barber had been developing the Spelunker game design for some time, but it ended up being too complex for the Atari 2600. Martin was responsible for game logic, Foley developed the graphic engine and game level editor, and Barber was the graphic designer and level editor. As Spelunker was Martin's original idea and he programmed the game logic, the game was issued with his name as the lead game developer, with the intention to alternate this role for subsequent games, but the short lifespan of the company meant that this did not happen. In 1984, they turned publication over to Broderbund and developed versions of Spelunker for the Atari 8-bit computers and Commodore 64. Martin programmed both versions of the game and they are nearly identical outside minor graphical differences.

Although MicroGraphicImage was able to maintain a steady stream of contract work, the company was not profitable due to the overheads of financial business focus going into publishing. The game recession that started in the winter of 1982 deteriorated, and it was very difficult to find distributors to take games, especially from small publishers. Eventually, MicroGraphicImage ran out of money and ceased operations. Martin continued working with Broderbund on a business level and was able recover all debt through NES and coin-op versions of Spelunker.

Martin and Foley continued to work together, including at an Amiga publishing company called Inovatronics. Eventually, Martin was a co-founder of the Internet provider Internet America. As of 2007, Foley was working at Perot Systems.

== Reception ==
The game was met with positive reviews. Bryan Welch reviewed the original Atari-8 bit version of Spelunker for 1984 Antic Magazine Buyers Guide and recommended Spelunker to players who like arcade-type games and are looking for a challenge. Computer Gaming World of 1985 called Spelunker "a thoroughly enjoyable game ... a class act". Ahoy! in 1986 said that the Commodore 64 version's "graphics are amazingly intricate".

In Japan, Game Machine listed the arcade version of Spelunker on their February 15, 1986 issue as being the fourth most-successful table arcade unit of the month.

== Legacy ==
The game was re-released for Virtual Console in Japan on August 28, 2007, and in 2008 for North America on March 17, and Europe on September 5 on Wii. It was released in 2013 in Japan on April 27, and in North America and Europe on June 6 for the Wii U Virtual Console. The game was made available for the Nintendo 3DS Virtual Console in Japan on December 19, 2012, and in 2013 for North America on June 27, and Europe on July 18.

Sony Computer Entertainment of Japan released Spelunker HD for the PlayStation 3 on the PlayStation Network Store. It received the PlayStation Store best sales award in 2009 from Sony Computer Entertainment of Japan. The game is a remake of the NES port, with high definition graphics and 10 large caves with 10 levels in each.

In 2015, Square Enix released the free-to-play sequel Spelunker World for PlayStation 4 and PlayStation Vita. A new game based on Spelunker World was released in Japan for the Nintendo Switch in April 2017. It was later released as a download worldwide and physically only in Japan, as Spelunker Party! on October 19 the same year.

In 2016, a collaboration between Spelunker and the Neptunia series resulted to an unlockable minigame mode called "Neplunker" for Megadimension Neptunia VII.

An updated version of the game was announced in 2018 for the Intellivision Amico.

In Japan, the term "Speranker" is used to refer to baseball players who are frequently injured, coming from the protagonist's weak physique.

== See also ==
- Spelunky
- SteamWorld Dig
