= The Cheerleaders =

1973 film by Paul Glickler

- DVD cover
- Directed by: Paul Glickler
- Written by: Ace Baandige; Paul Glickler; Richard Lerner; Tad Richards
- Produced by: Robert Boggs; Paul Glickler; Richard Lerner
- Starring: Stephanie Fondue; Denise Dillaway; Jovita Bush; Brandy Woods; Kimberly Hyde
- Cinematography: Richard Lerner
- Edited by: Joseph Ancore; Paul Glickler; Larry Goldman; Richard Lerner
- Music by: David Herman
- Distributed by: Cinemation Industries
- Release date: March 1973
- Running time: 82 minutes
- Country: United States
- Language: English
- Budget: US$153,000 (estimated)
- Box office: $2.5 million (U.S./ Canada rentals)

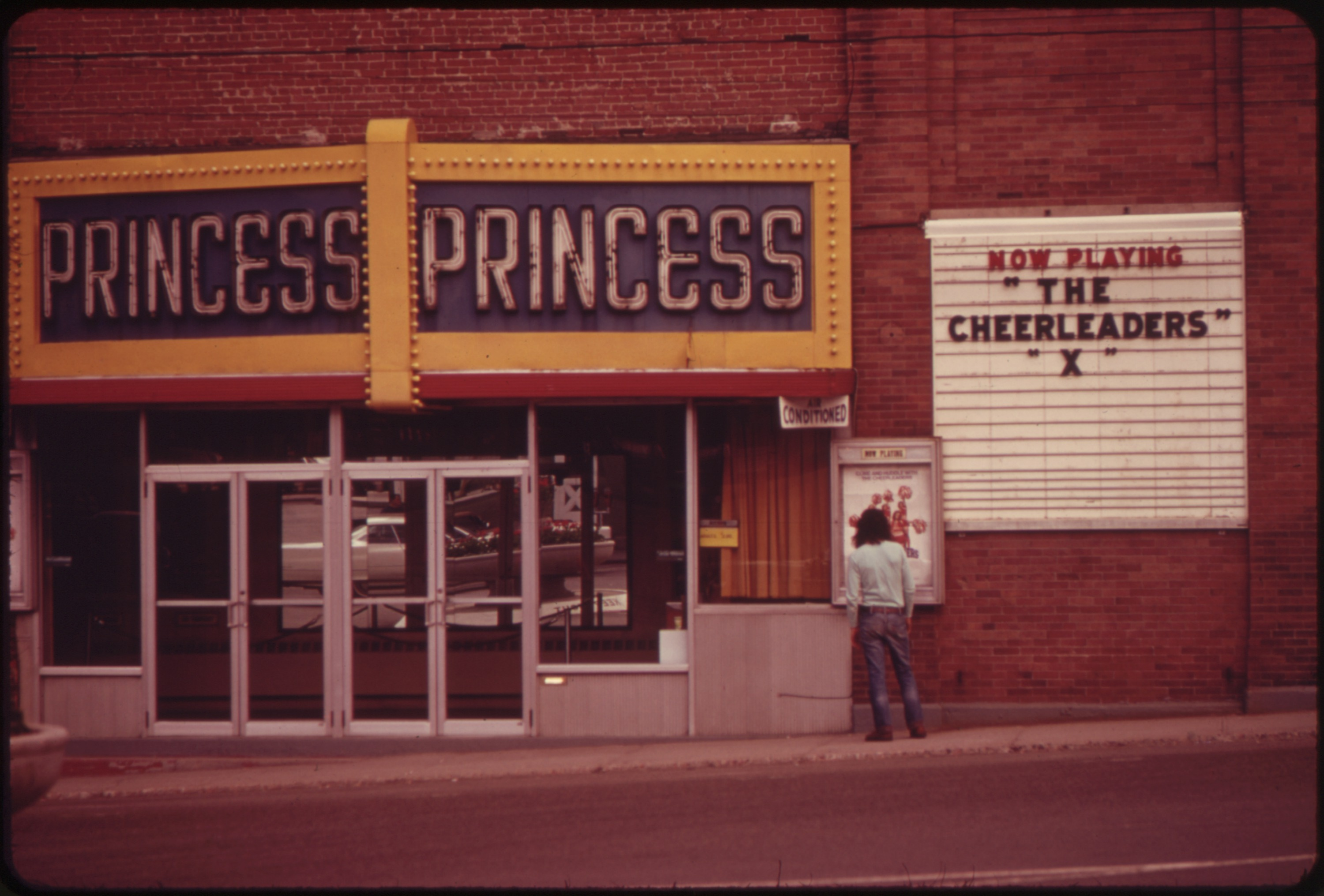
The Cheerleaders playing at a movie theater in Berlin, New Hampshire (June 1973)

The Cheerleaders is a 1973 erotic comedy film directed by Paul Glickler, starring Stephanie Fondue and Denise Dillaway.

== Plot ==
Jeannie, a spirited student at Amarosa High School, found herself at a crossroads. Encouraged by her friends Bonnie and Debbie, she decided to try out for the cheerleading squad. There was an opening due to one of the cheerleaders unexpectedly ending up in the maternity ward. The stakes were high, and Jeannie’s fate hung in the balance.

During the nerve-wracking tryouts, Jeannie’s secret was revealed. Bonnie whispered to the head cheerleader, Claudia, that Jeannie was a virgin. Claudia, always one to seize an opportunity, saw potential in Jeannie. She approached their coach, Isabel, with a proposition: perhaps Jeannie was the missing piece needed to carry the squad through the season.

And so, Jeannie was selected. But there was a twist. Claudia and Isabel made a bet: would Jeannie retain her virtue until the end of the season? It was an unusual wager, but the stakes were high. Jeannie’s mettle would be tested in ways she never imagined.

The cheerleader initiation was a rite of passage. Jeannie found herself in the boys’ locker room, ready to take a shower. The other cheerleaders waited outside, anticipation in the air. But fate had other plans. As Jeannie soaped up, the team burst in, returning from practice. Their amorous intentions were clear, but Jeannie’s virtue remained intact—thanks to the timely intervention of Norm, her steadfast boyfriend.

As the season progressed, the cheerleaders faced another challenge. Prior to the game against Central, they held a slumber party at Jeannie’s house. But the Amarosa team crashed the party, seeking their own form of celebration. The cheerleaders obliged, except for Jeannie. It was a wild night, but fairness demanded reciprocity.

Determined to level the playing field, the cheerleaders embarked on a mission. They ventured into Central City, ensuring that the opposing team faced equal fatigue during the game. However, a twist awaited them. One of the opposition players had eluded their efforts and remained fresh. He played at full strength, threatening Amarosa’s chances.

At halftime, Jeannie stepped up, devising a plan. She confronted the elusive player, revealing a hidden weakness. The opposition’s star was no longer invincible. Isabel’s bet with Claudia was won, with Jeannie’s virtue lost in the process.

In a finale, engineered by Norm, Amarosa High emerged victorious. The cheerleaders cheered, and Jeannie’s journey—from initiation to triumph—was complete. As the confetti fell, she knew that sometimes, strength came from unexpected places.

== Cast ==
- Stephanie Fondue as Jeannie
- Denise Dillaway as Claudia
- Jovita Bush as Bonnie
- Sandy Evans as Suzie
- Kim Stanton as Patty
- Brandy Woods as Debbie
- Raoul Hoffnung as Novi
- Jonathan Jacobs as Norm
- Richard Meatwhistle as Jon
- Patrick Wright as Coach Gannon
- Terri Teague as Isabel

== Production ==
The film was made in the summer of 1972 in the cities of Cupertino, Sunnyvale and Oakland, California. The high school scenes were shot at Monta Vista High School in Cupertino. The administration of Monta Vista high school claimed to not be aware of the racy elements and theme of the movie. Many of the football player extras were recent graduates of local high schools from Cupertino and Sunnyvale. The red uniforms in the film representing the home team Amarosa High School were actual uniforms of Fremont High School in Sunnyvale from that same year. The locker room scenes were filmed at Laney College, located at 900 Fallon Street in Oakland. Another location used in the film was Golfland USA in Sunnyvale. One of the identified extras is Carl Ekern, who later played professional football for the Los Angeles Rams. He was a student football player at San Jose State University when the movie was made.

=== Casting ===
Twenty-one year old Enid Finnbogason was from St. Vital, a neighborhood of Winnipeg, Manitoba, Canada, who rode the local transit system for a dime, since she looked like a sixteen year old at the time. She was in a restaurant in Los Angeles with friends, including two members of the film industry, when she was approached by a casting agent for a movie. He asked Enid to walk across the street to the Ramada Inn, where they were currently casting a movie: "The Cheerleaders". She was given a copy of the script and was asked if she was ever a cheerleader; she had never been one. She was asked to do a cheer, so she remembered one from high school and guessed at the footwork. The casting director liked what she did, so she was asked to perform one of the scenes from the script. Afterwards, even though they had already cast Jeannie, the lead, they reconsidered and thought that Enid was perfect for the part. She accepted the role and was asked what she wanted to use as a stage name; she chose "Stephanie Fondue".

== Sequels ==
The film's success spawned a series of sequels during the 1970s. It was followed by The Swinging Cheerleaders (1974), directed by Jack Hill, Revenge of the Cheerleaders (1976) (a.k.a. Caught with Their Pants Down), directed by Richard Lerner, and The Great American Girl Robbery (1979) (a.k.a. Cheerleaders' Wild Weekend), directed by Jeff Werner.

== See also ==
- List of American films of 1973
