= Cheerleaders' Wild Weekend =

Cheerleaders Wild Weekend
- Starring: Kristine DeBell; Jason Williams
- Distributed by: Dimension Pictures
- Release date: 1979
- Country: USA
- Language: English

Cheerleaders' Wild Weekend is a 1979 cheerleader comedy film. It was also known as The Great American Girl Robbery.

Roger Ebert derided the film as a "Dog of the Week" in an episode of Sneak Previews in 1979.

== Plot ==
Fifteen cheerleaders from three rival high schools travel by bus to a state competition in Sacramento. During the trip, the bus is stopped at a roadblock by a man posing as a police officer. He is part of a group of former football players led by Wayne Mathews, a former star quarterback whose career was ended by an arm injury. Wayne, his younger brother Billy, and his former teammates hijack the bus and take the cheerleaders to a secluded cabin, intending to hold them for a $2 million ransom.

Wayne tries to prevent his more aggressive accomplices from harming the girls. Their chaperone, Frankie, is revealed to be part of the kidnapping plot. While in captivity, the cheerleaders are forced to participate in a topless beauty pageant. Initially divided by rivalries among their schools, they gradually begin cooperating. Meanwhile, the governor refuses to pay the ransom, and the kidnappers use radio personality Joyful Jerome to communicate their demands.

The cheerleaders eventually devise an escape plan, tying their underwear together to make a rope. They fight back against their captors, and one of the girls uses a chainsaw to fend off a pursuing kidnapper. While the cheerleaders make their escape, Wayne and Billy go to collect the ransom. Wayne uses his former football skills to evade the police and crowds while carrying the money. The cheerleaders are ultimately rescued, while Wayne and Billy successfully complete their plan.

== Cast ==
- Kristine DeBell as Debbie Williams
- Jason Williams as Wayne Matthews
- Anthony Lewis as George Henderson
- Ann Wharton as Lisa
- Janet Blythe as Croughton
- Deslyn Bernet as Anita
- Lachelle Price as Terri
- Leslie King as Sandy
- Joan Wolff as Pam
- Elizabeth Halsey as Susan
- Tracy King as LaSalle
- Carmen Hayward as Betty
- Debbie Doherty as Lucy
- Alexis Swanigan as Louise
- Janie Squire as Donna
- Hana Byrbo as Jeanne
- Shell Kepler as Marion
- Robert Houston as Billy Mathews
- John Albert as John "Big John" Hunsacker
- Courtney Sands as Frankie
- Lee Curtis as Joyful Jerome

== Production ==
=== Development ===
The film was produced during the peak of the 1970s drive-in exploitation era by Chuck Russell, marking his debut as a film producer. Russell would later find mainstream success directing films such as The Mask (1994) and Eraser (1996). The project was financed by executive producer Bill Osco, a veteran of the "sexploitation" genre known for Flesh Gordon and the 1976 musical version of Alice in Wonderland.

The film was originally shot under the title The Great American Girl Robbery. During post-production, the title was changed to Cheerleaders' Wild Weekend to capitalize on the commercial popularity of the "cheerleader exploitation" subgenre established by films like The Swinging Cheerleaders (1974). In various international markets and television syndication, the film was released under the titles Bus 17 Is Missing and The Day the Cheerleaders Were Kidnapped.

=== Casting ===
The cast featured several mainstays of the 1970s cult film circuit. Kristine DeBell was cast as the lead cheerleader, Debbie, following her rise to fame in Osco's Alice in Wonderland. Jason Williams, who also received a co-writing credit on the screenplay, portrayed the lead antagonist, Wayne Mathews. Marilyn Joi, known for her work in the blaxploitation and women in prison genres, was cast as the leader of the rival squad from Polk High.

=== Filming and post-production ===
Principal photography took place in California on a limited budget. The production utilized cinematographer Paul Ryan, who later earned acclaim for his work on A River Runs Through It (1992).

Critics have noted that the film suffers from an inconsistent tone, fluctuating between high-stakes kidnapping drama, slapstick comedy, and "cheesecake" eroticism. According to production history documented in later home media releases, several scenes were edited or re-dubbed to mitigate the intensity of the violence and racial tension to ensure an R-rating for the domestic market.

== Critical reception ==
Upon its release, Cheerleaders' Wild Weekend received generally negative reviews from contemporary critics, many of whom found its mixture of kidnapping drama and lighthearted comedy jarring. Roger Ebert and Gene Siskel featured the film as their "Dog of the Week" on the television program Sneak Previews, with Ebert criticizing its "schizoid" tone and low production values.

Retrospective reviews have been somewhat more balanced, often viewing the film as a curiosity of the late-1970s drive-in era. Brian Albright, in his book Wild Beyond Belief!, noted that while the film lacks the polished execution of later films produced by Chuck Russell, it serves as a notable example of the "cheerleader exploitation" subgenre's transition into more thriller-oriented territory.

== Home media ==
For several decades, the film was primarily available via low-quality VHS releases under its alternate titles, such as Bus 17 Is Missing. These versions were often heavily edited for television broadcast, removing much of the film's R-rated content.

In October 2024, the film underwent a significant restoration and was released on Blu-ray by the MVD Rewind Collection. This "Special Edition" release included a high-definition transfer from the original 35mm camera negative and featured a variety of bonus materials, including interviews with cast members and a retrospective look at the production's place in exploitation cinema history.
