= Sherpix =

American film distributor, 1965–1974

Sherpix, Inc.
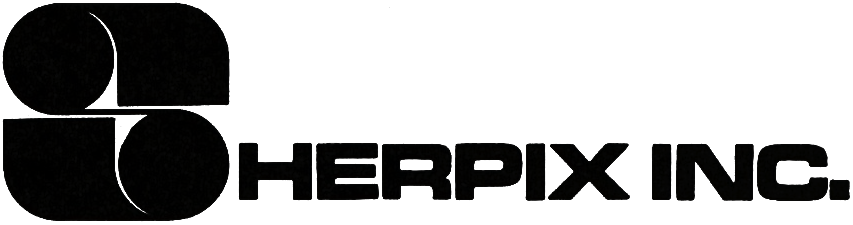
- Logo used in 1972
- Company type: Private
- Industry: Film
- Founded: April 15, 1965; 61 years ago
- Founders: Louis K. Sher
- Defunct: March 1, 1974; 52 years ago
- Headquarters: New York City, United States
- Services: Film distribution (specializing in arthouse cinema and American-produced pornography)
- Owner: Louis K. Sher
- Number of employees: 7 (1972)
- Parent: Art Theatre Guild, Inc.

Sherpix, Inc. was an American independent film distribution company that operated in the US and Canada between 1965 and 1974. Louis K. Sher founded the distributor as a subsidiary of his arthouse cinema chain Art Theatre Guild (ATG), which owned dozens of theaters throughout the United States. Sherpix specialized in art films, foreign films, erotica, and later pornographic films. The company's porn releases challenged the prevailing obscenity laws in the United States. Sherpix oriented its marketing to open-minded middle-class audiences, including young couples, rather than the "dirty old men" typically associated with adult movie theaters.

== History ==
Sherpix formally opened for business on April 15, 1965. In 1968 Sherpix distributed Flesh and Lonesome Cowboys, both directed by Andy Warhol. The company achieved a box-office success with its release of the 1969 softcore feature The Stewardesses. In 1970, the company made two major breakthroughs for pornography in the United States. First, it brought the American documentary Pornography in Denmark: A New Approach to cities beyond its premiere in San Francisco. Pornography in Denmark became the first feature-length hardcore porn film legally screened in the United States. The same year, Sherpix distributed Mona, a porn film structured around a fictional plot, which broke ground as the first non-documentary hardcore feature screened at American theaters.

Though Sherpix's early successes generated significant profits, providing the company with a major financial windfall, it was ultimately unable to capitalize on the ensuing peak years of the Golden Age of Porn. The company funded production of the surreal gay erotic film Pink Narcissus, which Sherpix released in 1971. James Bidgood, the director of Pink Narcissus, chose to remain anonymous in the film's credits due to his dissatisfaction with Sherpix's final cut, which he felt had compromised his artistic control. As a prime target for anti-obscenity prosecutors, the company faced numerous legal challenges, significantly constraining its financial resources. In 1973 Sher was convicted in Washington, D.C. of obscenity charges. Unable to sustain the company under the legal scrutiny and financial strain, in January 1974 Sher announced the company's imminent dissolution. The company disincorporated on March 1, 1974, and the following year the charges against Sher were dismissed on appeal.

== List of films distributed by Sherpix ==
For films initially released outside the United States, the listed release dates indicates the American premiere.

Release date	Title	Notes	Ref.
June 30, 1965	Crazy Paradise	Originally released in Denmark as Det tossede paradis. Sherpix's first release. Re-released in the US in 1966 by Allied Artists under the title Once Upon an Island.	
July 2, 1965	00-2 Most Secret Agents	Originally released in Italy as 00-2 agenti segretissimi. Re-released in the US in 1966 by Allied Artists under the title Oh! Those Most Secret Agents!	
July 5, 1967	Eros	Originally released in Brazil as Noite Vazia; also known in English as Men and Women.	
September 26, 1968	Flesh		
December 20, 1968	Lonesome Cowboys		
July 25, 1969	The Stewardesses		
November 16, 1969	Popcorn: An Audio/Visual Rock Thing		
November 26, 1969	Naked Zodiac		
December 24, 1969	Without a Stitch		
February 24, 1970	Pornography in Denmark: A New Approach		
March 4, 1970	Satanis: The Devil's Mass		
April 1970	Meat Rack		
August 1970	Sesso	Originally released in Italy as Nel labirinto.	
August 6, 1970	Mona the Virgin Nymph		
August 19, 1970	The Love Doll		
September 21, 1970	Not So Quiet Days	Originally released in Denmark as Stille dage i Clichy. The original English title is Quiet Days in Clichy. Grove Press distributed its original theatrical release in the United States; it was later re-released by Sherpix under the alternate title Not So Quiet Days.	
October 6, 1970	A History of the Blue Movie		
October 15, 1970	The Story of F		
October 30, 1970	Sexual Encounter Group		
November 1970	Hollywood Blue		
December 17, 1970	The Coming Thing		
May 24, 1971	Pink Narcissus		
October 11, 1971	Punishment Park		
April 3, 1972	Weed		

== Sources ==
- "Allied Artists". Section Two: Reviews. Motion Picture Exhibitor. 76 (2). Philadelphia: Jay Emanuel Publications, Inc.: 5433 August 17, 1966 – via the Internet Archive.
- Canby, Vincent (May 25, 1971). "Screen: 'Pink Narcissus': Movie at 2 Theaters Is Story of Homosexual". The New York Times. Vol. CXX, no. 41, 394. p. 44. ProQuest 119334385. Archived from the original on February 1, 2023. (subscription required)
- "Louis Sher into Distribution, Too". Variety. Vol. 238, no. 6. New York: Variety, Inc. March 31, 1965. pp. 11, 78. ProQuest 962960651.
- Jones, William E. (Summer 2019). "Against Nature". Artforum. Vol. 57, no. 10. New York: Artforum Media, LLC. Archived from the original on September 26, 2023.
- "New Sherpix to Distribute Art Films to U.S., Canada". Boxoffice. 86 (24): 6. April 5, 1965. ProQuest 1673756337.
- Sandberg, Patrik (May 23, 2022). "Elegy for a Packrat: Remembering James Bidgood". Frieze. No. 227. London: Frieze Publishing Ltd. Archived from the original on April 30, 2022.
- "Sherpix — The Unusual Company with an Unusual Future". The Independent Film Journal. 69 (11). New York: ITOA Independent Inc.: 20–21 April 27, 1972. ISSN 0019-3712. ProQuest 1014674898.
- Slide, Anthony (2013). "Sherpix". The New Historical Dictionary of the American Film Industry. New York: Routledge. p. 186. ISBN 978-1-579-58056-8 – via Google Books.
- Verrill, Addison (December 30, 1970). "Bill Osco, Boy King of L.A. Porno, Grossing over $2,000,000 Presently; 10-City Nucleus; 'Actors' A-Plenty". Variety. Vol. 261, no. 7. New York: Variety, Inc. p. 5. ProQuest 963024393.
- ——— (January 27, 1971). "TV Cassettes Bid for Sex Pix". Variety. Vol. 261, no. 11. New York: Variety, Inc. pp. 1, 54. ProQuest 963014677.
- ——— (January 16, 1974). "Sher, Found Guilty, Scrams Porno". Variety. Vol. 273, no. 10. New York: Variety, Inc. pp. 5, 41. ProQuest 1032478801.

=== From the AFI Catalog of Feature Films ===
- Krafsur, Richard P., ed. (1976). The American Film Institute Catalog. Vol. F6: Feature Films 1961–1970. New York: R. R. Bowker Company. ISBN 0-8352-0453-7 – via the Internet Archive. (registration required)
- "Punishment Park (1971)". AFI Catalog of Feature Films. Los Angeles: American Film Institute. n.d.

=== From the TCM Movie Database ===
- "00-2 Most Secret Agents (1965)". TCM Movie Database. Atlanta: Turner Classic Movies. n.d. Archived from the original on April 16, 2021.
- "Lonesome Cowboys (1968)". TCM Movie Database. Atlanta: Turner Classic Movies. n.d. Archived from the original on December 6, 2021.
- "Mona (1970)". TCM Movie Database. Atlanta: Turner Classic Movies. n.d. Archived from the original on March 21, 2017.
- "Naked Zodiac (1969)". TCM Movie Database. Atlanta: Turner Classic Movies. n.d. Archived from the original on February 24, 2024.
- "Pornography in Denmark: A New Approach (1970)". TCM Movie Database. Atlanta: Turner Classic Movies. n.d. Archived from the original on November 14, 2023.
- "Weed (1972)". TCM Movie Database. Atlanta: Turner Classic Movies. n.d. Archived from the original on June 18, 2015.
