= Mona the Virgin Nymph =

- Film poster
- Directed by: Michael Benveniste; Howard Ziehm
- Written by: Bucky Searles
- Produced by: Bill Osco
- Starring: Judy Angel; Gerard Broulard; Orrin North; Susan Stewart; Fifi Watson
- Cinematography: Howard Ziehm
- Production company: Graffiti Productions
- Distributed by: Sherpix
- Release date: August 6, 1970 (San Francisco)
- Running time: 71 minutes
- Country: United States
- Language: English
- Budget: $7,000 (est.)
- Box office: $2 million (est.)

Mona (also promoted as Mona; the Virgin Nymph) is a 1970 American pornographic film directed by Michael Benveniste and Howard Ziehm, produced by Bill Osco, and starring Judy Angel, Gerard Broulard, Orrin North, Susan Stewart and Fifi Watson. The film was screened without credits due to legal concerns. It is regarded as the second sexually explicit film to receive a general theatrical release in the United States, after Andy Warhol's Blue Movie (1969). However, unlike Blue Movie (which was shot without a script), Mona had a plot, though there was more emphasis on the action.

Mona helped pave the way for other films containing unsimulated sex scenes (both penetrative and non-penetrative) that subsequently appeared in theaters, during the Golden Age of Porn (1969–1984); and was a big influence on later films of the genre. Deep Throat (1972), for example, borrowed elements of Mona's plot.

Earnings, believed to be $2 million, helped finance the directors' 1974 film Flesh Gordon. The team also produced Harlot (1971), and Osco later backed the similarly explicit Alice in Wonderland (1976).

== Plot ==
Mona (Fifi Watson) and her fiancé Jim (Orrin North) are having a picnic, and they both strip and began to make love, but she stops him, claiming that she has promised her mother (Judy Angel) not to have intercourse until marriage. However, she joyfully performs fellatio on Jim.

When Mona gets home, her mother reminds her of her promise and that the mother was also a virgin before marrying her father, who was a good man. Mona remembers being a child and wanting to play with her father (portrayed only from the hip downwards), who urges her to perform fellatio on him. Going outside again, she again performs fellatio, this time on a complete stranger. Afterward, a prostitute (Susan Stewart) performs cunnilingus on her. Jim stops by Mona's house and has sex with her mother.

In a movie theatre, Mona masturbates and performs fellatio on a nearby male patron (Gerard Broulard). Jim catches them and tells Mona that he will punish her by calling all the people she had oral sex with. He ties Mona to a bed, and all of her previous partners surround her and engage in a long, intense oral sex party. At the end of the film, Mona and her mother confess their sexual affairs.

== Cast ==
- Judy Angel (Uncredited) as Mona's mother
- Gerard Broulard (Uncredited) as movie theater patron
- Orrin North (Uncredited) as Jim
- Susan Stewart (Uncredited) as a prostitute
- Fifi Watson (Uncredited) as Mona

== Critical reception ==
A retrospective review of the film in Salon described it as "important because it’s considered to be the first adult film with a plot to screen in American theaters. Its coherent narrative structure and 'psychological motivation' (Mona wants to remain a 'penis-in-vagina' virgin until she’s married) made it unique. Plus, it had all the sex." Writing in the film review site Cinepassion, critic Fernando F. Croce reported that the film "has a disarming directness, as when the severe widow (Judy Angel) greets her future son-in-law at the door in transparent camisole and garter belt," and noted "also intriguing is the soundtrack, especially as it drowns out dialogue with harpsichords, ukeleles, electronic dissonance, and, in a scene that brushes ever so gently against Kiarostami's Shirin, the disembodied voices of Taylor and Burton as The Taming of the Shrew unspools in a theater."
