= Larry Gelman =

American actor (1930–2021)

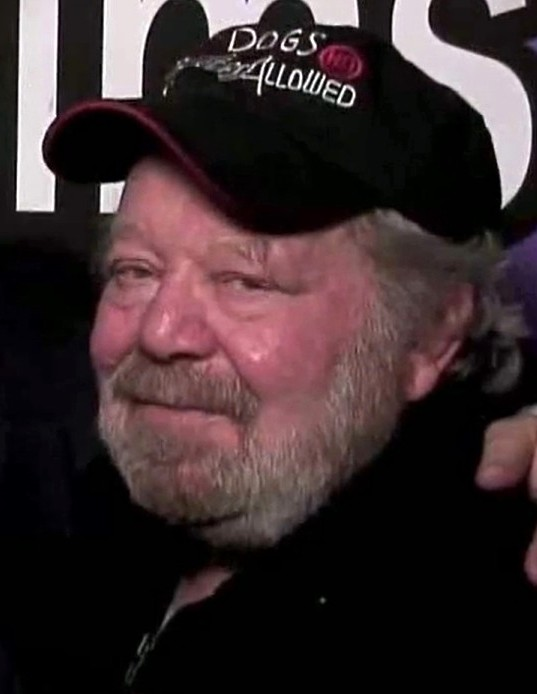
- Gelman in 2009
- Born: Lawrence Sheldon Gelman; November 3, 1930; Brooklyn, New York, U.S.
- Died: June 7, 2021 (aged 90); Los Angeles, California, U.S.
- Occupation: Actor
- Spouse: Barbara Gelman (?–his death)

Lawrence Sheldon Gelman (November 3, 1930 – June 7, 2021) was an American film and television character actor. He was known for playing Dr. Bernie Tupperman on the TV series The Bob Newhart Show and Vinnie, the poker playing friend of Oscar and Felix, in the original TV series version of The Odd Couple.

== Biography ==
Gelman was born in Brooklyn, New York, on November 3, 1930.

On television, Gelman portrayed Leo Gold in Free Country, Irv Schlosser in Grand Slam, Dr. Hubie Binder in Maude officer Bernstein on Eight Is Enough, Al Clemens on Mork & Mindy. and Max on Needles and Pins.

Gelman appeared in other American television series, including The Monkees (3 episodes), Batman, Get Smart, I Dream of Jeannie, My Three Sons, The Doris Day Show (3 episodes), The Mary Tyler Moore Show, The Carol Burnett Show, Rhoda, Kojak (2 episodes), Quincy M.E., CHiPS, The Love Boat, Laverne & Shirley, One Day at a Time (2 episodes), Barney Miller (4 episodes), The Facts of Life, Simon & Simon, Hill Street Blues, Remington Steele, Cagney & Lacey (3 episodes), Scarecrow and Mrs. King, Mr. Belvedere (2 episodes), In the Heat of the Night (2 episodes), Night Court (3 episodes), Doogie Howser, M.D., The Super Mario Bros. Super Show!, Touched by an Angel and ER. He appeared in Tales from the Darkside Love Hungry (series 4, episode 11, 1988) as Elmo. He also was nominated for a Primetime Emmy for Outstanding Single Performance by a Supporting Actor in a Comedy or Drama Series, for his guest-starring appearance on the episode "Goodbye, Mr. Fish: Part 2" of the American sitcom television series Barney Miller.

In film, Gelman appeared (credited as Larry Spelman) in the X-rated 1976 film Alice in Wonderland with Kristine DeBell, and the adult comedy Chatterbox (1977) starring Candice Rialson. He also had roles in Disney's Superdad (1973), The Strongest Man in the World (1975), Tunnel Vision (1976), Raid on Entebbe (1977), The Triangle Factory Fire Scandal (1979), The Frisco Kid (1979), O'Hara's Wife (1982), Dreamscape (1984), Girls Just Want to Have Fun (1985), The Naked Cage (1986) and Mr. Saturday Night (1992).

On Broadway, Gelman portrayed Tambi Rothman in The Roast (1980). His other stage activities included touring in a production of The Odd Couple and playing Albert Einstein in Einstein: A Stage Portrait.

Gelman also played Einstein in the real-time strategy games Command & Conquer: Red Alert 2 and Command & Conquer: Yuri's Revenge.

He died in June 2021, at the age of 90, from injuries suffered in a fall.

== Television ==
Year	Title	Role	Notes
1966	The Monkees	Director	S1:E12, "I've Got a Little Song Here"
1967	The Monkees	Stage Manager	S1:E23, "Captain Crocodile"
1967	The Monkees	Salesman	S2:E15, "The Christmas Show"
