= Pink Narcissus =

1971 film by James Bidgood

- Directed by: James Bidgood
- Written by: James Bidgood
- Produced by: James Bidgood
- Starring: Bobby Kendall; Charles Ludlam
- Cinematography: James Bidgood
- Edited by: Martin Jay Sadoff
- Music by: Martin Jay Sadoff; Gary Goch
- Distributed by: Sherpix
- Release date: May 24, 1971
- Running time: 71 minutes
- Country: U.S.
- Language: English
- Budget: $27,000 (estimated)

Pink Narcissus is a 1971 American experimental erotic art film directed by James Bidgood and starring Bobby Kendall, Don Brooks, and stage actor Charles Ludlam. It visualizes the erotic fantasies of a gay male prostitute.

== Premise ==
Between visits from his keeper, or John, a handsome male prostitute (Bobby Kendall), alone in his apartment, lounges, fantasizing about worlds where he is the central character. For example, he pictures himself as a matador, a Roman slave boy and the emperor who condemns him, and the keeper of a male harem for whom another male performs a belly dance.

== Production ==
In a 2005 interview, Bidgood enumerated some of the film's inspirations, such as the British film The Red Shoes and actress Maria Montez. Most of the film's extras were people actor Don Brooks found on the streets when he went out of the set on "talent searches".

The film is mostly shot on 8 mm film with bright, otherworldly lighting and intense colors. Aside from its last, climactic scene, which was shot in a downtown Manhattan loft, it was produced in its entirety (including outdoor scenes) in Bidgood's small New York City apartment over a seven-year (from 1963 to 1970) period and ultimately released without the consent of the director, who therefore had himself credited as Anonymous. He said in the interview, "See, why I took my name off of it was that I was protesting, which I'd heard at the time that's what you did..."

== Provenance ==
Because the name of the filmmaker was not widely known, there were rumors that Andy Warhol was behind it. In the mid-1990s, writer Bruce Benderson began a search for its maker based on several leads and finally verified that it was James Bidgood, who was still living in Manhattan and was working on a film script. In 1999, a book researched and written by Benderson was published by Taschen about Bidgood's body of photographic and filmic work.

== Music ==
- Joseph Haydn: Horn Concerto No. 1
- Modest Mussorgsky: Pictures at an Exhibition
- Modest Mussorgsky: Night on Bald Mountain
- Sergei Prokofiev: Alexander Nevsky
- Kenneth Gaburo: "Lemon Drops"
- Genaro Nunez, Banda Taurina, Rosalio Juarez: "Corazon Hispano"

== Release ==
Pink Narcissus was initially released on May 24, 1971.

In 2003, the film was re-released by Strand Releasing as the film had its 35th anniversary in 2006.

== Restoration ==
In 2025, indie distributor Strand Releasing restored the movie in 4K resolution and screened it in April 2025, as part of NewFest "So Obsessed" spring series in New York City.

== Legacy ==
Bidgood's unmistakably kitschy style was later imitated and refined by artists such as Pierre et Gilles.

== See also ==
- List of American films of 1971
