= Marc Stevens (actor) =

American pornographic actor (1943–1989)

- Born: September 2, 1943; New York City, U.S.
- Died: January 28, 1989 (aged 45)
- Cause of death: AIDS
- Other name: Mr. 10-1/2
- Years active: 1971–1988
- Spouse(s): Jill Monroe (?–1979); Miranda Stevens

Marc Stevens (September 2, 1943 – January 28, 1989) was an American erotic performer. He is sometimes credited as Mark '10½' Stevens or Mark Stevens.

== Early life ==
Marc Stevens was born Mark Kuttner in Brooklyn in 1943. He was the third of four children born to first generation Jewish parents Walter and Hannah. He attended Midwood High School in Brooklyn.

== Career ==
Stevens was a pioneering figure in the sex industry during the 1970s in New York City. He appeared in over 80 pornographic movies; he also led an erotic dance troupe titled Le Clique and performed in live sex shows. He was bisexual, and while he predominantly appeared in heterosexual films and porn loops, he made a number of gay films as well. He was a close associate of leading sex industry figures such as Jason and Tina Russell, Annie Sprinkle, Sharon Mitchell, Jamie Gillis, Georgina Spelvin, and Gloria Leonard. Tall and lean with a well-defined musculature, he had the nickname "10½" because of the supposed size of his circumcised penis. He was famously photographed by Robert Mapplethorpe.

== Notable films ==
Notable films featuring Marc Stevens include:

- The Devil in Miss Jones
- All about Gloria Leonard
- Michael, Angelo and David

== Honorable recognition ==
Stevens was posthumously inducted into the XRCO Hall of Fame on April 30, 2008. He was inducted into the AVN Hall of Fame on January 26, 2019.

== Death ==
Stevens died of AIDS on January 28, 1989, aged 45 in New York City.

He produced two memoirs (long out of print and allegedly ghost-written by his mother), titled 10½! and Making It Big.

== See also ==
- Golden Age of Porn
- List of male performers in gay porn films
