= Flesh Gordon Meets the Cosmic Cheerleaders =

1989 film by Howard Ziehm

- Region 2 DVD cover
- Directed by: Howard Ziehm
- Written by: Howard Ziehm; Doug Frisby
- Produced by: Maurice Smith; Gary Melius; Joseph Garofalo; Joe Allegro
- Starring: Vince Murdocco; Robyn Kelly; Tony Travis; William Dennis Hunt; Morgan Fox; Bruce Scott; Maureen Webb
- Cinematography: Danny Nowak
- Edited by: Joe Tomatore
- Music by: Paul Zaza
- Distributed by: New Horizons
- Release date: January 30, 1990
- Running time: 98 minutes (cut); 102 minutes (uncut)
- Country: Canada
- Language: English
- Budget: $1-3.6 million
- Box office: $1.3 million

Flesh Gordon Meets the Cosmic Cheerleaders (aka Flesh Gordon 2: Flesh Gordon Meets the Cosmic Cheerleaders) is a 1990 Canadian superhero sex comedy film, and the sequel to the sex comedy Flesh Gordon. Like the original, it spoofs the Flash Gordon serials, though the humor is more scatological than the original. Only William Dennis Hunt returns from the original cast.

== Plot ==
On Earth, Flesh is being filmed for an erotic science fiction film. A major mishap occurs on the set and the director fires the whole crew. Flesh is kidnapped by a trio of outer space cheerleaders as he is leaving the set. Dale, Flesh's fiancé, and Doctor Flexi Jerkoff take off in a spaceship to rescue him. The cheerleaders take Flesh to their planet and introduce him to their leader, Robunda Hooters. She tells him that the planet's men have been infected by Evil Presence's "Impotence Radiation". Flesh is believed to possess "The Virile Force", so he alone can stop the ray. Evil Presence and Master Bator, Presence's equally-deviant assistant, hear of Flesh's arrival. Presence plans to kidnap him, steal his penis, and become the only virile man in the universe.

Meanwhile, as Dale and Jerkoff feel the effects of the radiation, their spaceship's power reduces and lands on the cheerleaders' planet. While searching for Flesh, they spot the college, "Cosmic High", and explore it. They find Flesh being seduced into an orgy by the cheerleaders. Dale is devastated to discover Flesh is supposedly cheating on her, while Presence and his crew invade and kidnap Dale. Flesh and Jerkoff hop on a rocketship and race to her rescue.

The cheerleaders start chasing Flesh across the galaxy. Flesh and Jerkoff manage to lose them, but their soon runs out of power and crash-lands on a strange planet surrounded by "Mammary Mountains", giant lactating breast-shaped hills overdosed with silicon. Jerkoff insists that he and Flesh stay for a while, as he becomes obsessed by the breast-like relics. This changes when the hills lure them to a gay alien. As the pair flee, the cheerleaders land on the planet and spot them hiding in a cave. The alien sticks his genitalia into the cave and ejaculates inside.

Flesh and Jerkoff slide down the cave and enter the "G-Spot", a milk bar run by voluptuous lactating women, who turn their customers into overgrown babies. Bazonga Bomber, a waitress, serves Jerkoff and Flesh. Though Flesh wisely passes, Jerkoff fails to resist the temptation and gets turned into a baby. The cheerleaders catch up with Flesh and Jerkoff at the milk bar. Robunda and Flesh make amends and Bazonga points to the exit. Jerkoff, Flesh, and Robunda go through a tunnel and notice an unpleasant smell. They soon find its source: a tribe of sentient excrements, known as "The Turd People", who insist the three should join their clan. The Turd People are about to reincarnate the trio into Turds, but Jerkoff repels them with laxative chewing gum. One of the Turds, Bazonga's long-lost father, informs the trio of Dale's whereabouts and helps them escape on a rocketship he has built.

Flesh, Jerkoff, and Robunda arrive at Evil Presence's palace. Presence and Bator detain them and are about to operate on Flesh, when Robunda's cheerleaders appear. One almost kills Bater, but Flesh spares his life. Flesh then reluctantly accepts Robunda's idea of having sex with Queen Frigid, in a bid to stop the impotence ray. Presence becomes horrified at witnessing this actually happening and starts a fight with Flesh. He turns out to be Flesh's old enemy, Emperor Wang. Bator and Frigid, now sick of Wang's evil ways, help Flesh to stop the impotence ray. Wang forces Flesh into a pit, but falls in with him. They land in a spider's web, and a spider emerges. As it catches Wang, Flesh frees himself and lands on the bottom of the pit. He retrieves a jewelled chest from a Jewish sentinel, makes his way out, and presents it to Frigid. He releases an oversized condom out of the chest, which Bator applies to the phallic impotence ray-gun.

With the ray stopped and the universe's virility restored, the group celebrates. Frigid reunites with Homer, her ex-husband, while Flesh and Dale reconcile. Robunda no longer feels the urge of pursuing Flesh and finds satisfaction in Jerkoff. The heroes state their need to go back home, but Frigid and Homer invite them to their remarriage. Afterward, both parties exchange farewells. While Wang roams the palace grounds in humiliation, the heroes return to Earth.

== Cast ==
- Vince Murdocco as Flesh Gordon
- Robyn Kelly as Dale Ardor
- Tony Travis as Dr. Flexi Jerkoff
- William Dennis Hunt as Evil Presence
- Morgan Fox as Robunda Hooters
- Bruce Scott as Master Bator
- Maureen Webb as Queen Frigid
- Stevie-Lyn Ray as Babs
- Sharon Rowley as Candy Love
- Blaire Kashino as Sushi
- Melissa Mounds as Bazonga Bomber

== Reception ==
Despite gaining a cult following, and selling well on VHS and DVD, the film received very negative reviews from critics.

== Production ==
Following the success of the Flesh Gordon, Howard Ziehm began developing a sequel in the late 1970s under the working title of The Further Adventures of Flesh Gordon with the script written by Ziehm and Carol Chassen with the intention of shooting the film for an R-rating in contrast to the first film which was shot as an X-rated film until a ballooning budget necessitated securing a larger audience and editing it down to an R-rated feature. Despite the success of Flesh Gordon, Ziehm had trouble securing financing for the film. While American International Pictures was interested and offered to back the film for $1.5 million, the prospective budget for what Ziehm wanted to bring on screen was nearly double that amount. In the 1980s, Canadian producer Maurice Smith became involved with the film, now titled Flesh Gordon Meets the Cosmic Cheerleaders, and helped to secure the needed financing and secured distribution for the film in France, Japan, and the United Kingdom. The visual effects were done by the Michigan-based FX Center who had previously worked on Moontrap.

== Soundtrack ==
1. Stuck on You Baby - The Groovaholics and Ian McNeil
2. The Hero Always Gets the Girl - Bruce Scott
3. The All-American Hero - Rod Knowlan
