= Spelunker HD =

2009 video game

- English Logo
- Developer: Irem Software Engineering
- Publishers: Irem Software Engineering; Tozai Games
- Platform: PlayStation 3
- Release: JP: March 26, 2009; NA: November 23, 2010; EU: August 10, 2011; Spelunker Black: JP: January 7, 2010
- Genre: Platform

Spelunker HD (Note: Known in Japan as Minna de Spelunker (Japanese: みんなでスペランカー, Hepburn: Min'na de Superankā, lit. Everyone's Spelunker).) is a PlayStation 3 downloadable platform video game developed by and published by Irem Software Engineering and Tozai Games. It is a remake of the 1985 NES port of Irem's arcade version of Tim Martin's Spelunker and was available on the PlayStation Network's Store. While in terms of gameplay the game does not differ greatly from the original, it adds HD graphics, although the NES version can still be played, as well as 100 all-new levels over 10 different locations. A Japanese-only version titled Spelunker Black (Note: Known in Japan as Minna de Spelunker Black (Japanese: みんなでスペランカー ブラック, Hepburn: Min'na de Superankā Burakku, lit. Everyone's Spelunker Black).) was later made available on the PlayStation Store in 2010. It features Black Spelunker as the new protagonist along with a much narrower field of vision.

The game was released in Japan on March 26, 2009, the rest of Asia on July 28, in North America on November 23, 2010, and in Europe on August 10, 2011.

In 2015, Square Enix released a free-to-play sequel for the PlayStation 4 titled Spelunker World.

An enhanced remake, Spelunker HD Deluxe, was released for the PlayStation 4 and Nintendo Switch in 2021.

== PlayStation Home ==
Irem released a PlayStation Home themed space based on the remake, Minna de Spelunker, in the Japanese version of PlayStation Home on March 19, 2009, and the Asian version on July 23. This space was called the "Gathering Place for Spelunkers" and included a Message Board, a video screen, seating for the avatars, a Stone Monument which is a credits reel of the developers, eight artifact displays, three in-lounge avatars that tell the users something (Weedy Spelunker?, Wise Boy, & Muttering Old Man), and a full game launching support feature accessed by the Stone Statues of the Moon & Sun or the Stone Statues of the Wind & Rain. There were also dancing purple ghost that came out at certain times. There was also an expansion to the space, called "The Bat-infested Abandoned Mine Cave", that took users deeper into the cave of the Gathering Place for Spelunkers. They could play Flashbang Launcher where they collected the Flashband, the Underground Key (Red), and the Dynamite without getting hit by bat guano, then play Rocks that could be destroyed by dynamite and blow up rocks with the dynamite collected, then play Minecarts and ride a cart to a place where they were chased by a boulder to a room. In the room there was a shop with Minna de Spelunker related items. There was also a door called "The door to the 2nd level underground?" which when accessing, gave the users a prize, but could not be opened until a later time.

The game of Minna de Spelunker supported Home rewards such as a spelunker costume for the user avatars.

== Spelunker Black ==
Logo for Spelunker Black

An additional version, titled Minna de Spelunker Black, was released on January 7, 2010, for Japan. Although it was never localized, western media has referred to the game as Spelunker Black. The Black version is a re-release of Spelunker HD with minor changes in gameplay and a new playable character. A large portion of the player's vision is now obscured by darkness throughout the stages. A flare could be released into the air to temporarily grant the player a broader field of vision. The game's increased difficulty contributed to its low popularity compared to its original version. It was later removed from the PSN alongside Spelunker HD when Tozai Games acquired the publishing rights of the series from Irem. The base game was then republished under Tozai Games, but the Black version remains delisted to this day.

== See also ==
- List of downloadable PlayStation games
