= Spelunker II: Yūja e no Chōsen =

1987 platformer video game

- Cover art
- Developer: Now Production
- Publisher: Irem
- Platform: Family Computer
- Release: JP: September 18, 1987
- Genre: Action
- Mode: Single-player

Spelunker II: Yūja e no Chōsen (スペランカーII 勇者(ゆうじゃ)への挑戦(ちょうせん); lit. 'Spelunker II: A Challenge for the Brave') is an action platformer video game developed by Now Production and released by Irem for the Family Computer in 1987.

Despite being titled as a sequel to Spelunker, Yūja e no Chōsen features vastly different gameplay. There was a separate arcade sequel, titled Spelunker II: 23 no Kagi, which features similar gameplay to the first Spelunker game as well. The two Spelunker II games are separate entries in the series and are not related.

There is confusion about the game title, where the word "yūja" is often replaced by "yūsha". The word 勇者 (lit. 'hero' or 'brave one') in the original title is almost always read as "ゆうしゃ" (yūsha) in Japanese, not "ゆうじゃ" (yūja). However the package of the game indeed reads it as "ゆうじゃ" (yūja). (Note: This is shown by dakuten, two small dots, and easily overlooked.) Many sites cite the game by the normal reading "yūsha".

== Gameplay ==
The player dodges a fireball attack from a zombie.

Geyla has been the ruler of Fairy Land since a massive demon invasion 1,000 years ago, and continues to rule it with an iron grip. A viewpoint similar to Konami's Ganbare Goemon is utilized, allowing players to go in four different directions.

The player controls an anonymous treasure hunter who seeks treasure within Fairy Land. Unlike most video game characters, the player is an antihero who is unsure whether to liberate Fairy Land or simply become rich from all their treasures. Player decisions in the game influence how the story ends. Obstacles include lava fields, bottomless pits, and enemies. There are also bosses at the end of each respective stage.

The character's well-being in the game is charted by two metrics: a "life" meter measuring the player's stamina, and a "Toku" meter measuring the player's morality level. Killing undead creatures improves the player's "Toku" rating. Players can choose from three character classes: explorer, clergy, or esper. The explorer is a variation of the original Spelunker character, the Esper is an adept magic user with the ability to throw thunderbolts, and the clergy member can shoot fireballs at the enemy. The number of days that have elapsed in-game and the current in-game time are shown, and must be taken into account for some tasks. If a player with a high "Toku" rating falls down a pit, they are revived at a minimum cost, while those with a low "Toku" meter descend to eternal damnation in Hell, thus ending the game.

== Reception ==
In Japan, Game Machine listed the arcade version of Spelunker II: 23 no Kagi in their October 15, 1986 issue as the 17th most-successful table arcade unit of the month.
