= Alice in Wonderland (1976 film) =

American erotic musical comedy film by Bud Townsend

- Theatrical release poster
- Directed by: Bud Townsend
- Screenplay by: Bucky Searles
- Based on: Alice's Adventures in Wonderland and Through the Looking-Glass by Lewis Carroll
- Produced by: William Osco
- Starring: Kristine De Bell; Larry Gelman; Alan Novak; Terri Hall (Terry Hall); Jason Williams
- Cinematography: Joseph Bardo
- Edited by: Shaun Walsh
- Music by: Jack Stern
- Production companies: Cruiser Productions; Essex Pictures Company
- Distributed by: General National Enterprises
- Release date: June 11, 1976
- Running time: 72 minutes
- Country: United States
- Language: English
- Budget: $350,000-$500,000
- Box office: $90 million

Alice in Wonderland is a 1976 American erotic musical comedy film loosely based on Lewis Carroll's 1865 book Alice's Adventures in Wonderland. The film expands the original story to include sex and broad adult humor, as well as original songs. The film was directed by Bud Townsend, produced by William Osco, and written by Bucky Searles, based on a concept by Jason Williams.

The plot revolves around Alice (Kristine De Bell), a librarian who falls asleep reading the book Alice's Adventures in Wonderland, and dreams of the White Rabbit (Larry Gelman), whom she follows into Wonderland, where she begins to experiment with her unexplored sexuality. Through a series of sexual encounters, Alice loses her sexual inhibitions and allows herself to become sexually liberated. The film is a softcore erotic comedy with orchestrated musical numbers which move the plot forward, and contribute to the film's humor.

After premiering in a longer version, three minutes were edited from the film, and it was rated R by the MPAA, and released theatrically by General National, a company formed by producers Jason Williams and William Osco, due to other distributors being unwilling to distribute a sex film. The film grossed over $90 million at the box office. Osco later re-edited the film as hardcore, incorporating explicit sex that was not part of its original production. In 2004, Osco staged an Off-Broadway stage adaptation of the musical.

== Plot ==
After rejecting the advances of her boyfriend, William, mousy librarian Alice falls asleep reading Alice's Adventures in Wonderland. The White Rabbit appears to her in a dream and she follows him into Wonderland. Finding herself in a room and too large to fit through the small door, Alice drinks a potion which causes her to shrink while her dress remains the same size, leaving her naked. While chasing the White Rabbit, she falls into a river and begins to drown, but is saved by a group of local inhabitants. After making friends with them, Alice is given a new (albeit very revealing) dress before setting off after the White Rabbit again. While walking through the woods, she begins to experiment with her sexuality by stripping naked and masturbating. The White Rabbit happens upon her and takes her to meet the Mad Hatter.

Although initially uncomfortable when the Mad Hatter exposes himself to her, Alice performs fellatio. She is then called to assist Humpty Dumpty, who has fallen off a wall, rendering him unable to achieve an erection. The situation is rectified when Alice fellates Dumpty as well. She is then taken to meet siblings Tweedledee and Tweedledum, whom she watches having passionate, incestuous intercourse. Following this encounter, Alice, the White Rabbit, and the Mad Hatter continue on toward the King's Ball. On the way, they encounter a couple having sex in an open field; Alice chastises them, but she is ignored. At the royal court, the King of Hearts converses with Alice, speaking with her about self-empowerment and ignoring the judgements of others; he ultimately seduces her.

The Queen of Hearts appears, catching Alice and the King in bed together. A hurried trial is held and Alice is "convicted" of being a virgin. As punishment, the Queen orders Alice to have sex with her. A number of sexual escapades ensue among various characters as Alice prepares to carry out her sentence, including a brief lesbian encounter between Alice and the Queen's maids. Alice and the Queen engage in sex, but, as a result of the cunnilingus she receives from Alice, the Queen experiences an orgasm so strong, it briefly incapacitates her. The Mad Hatter and the White Rabbit assist Alice in escaping the Queen, who pursues her to no avail.

Waking from her dream and thereby returning to the real world, Alice meets William again. Having experienced a sexual awakening while in Wonderland, Alice accepts William's advances and they have sex in the library. In a closing sequence, Alice travels through Wonderland naked before she and William set off toward their new home, where they live "happily ever after".

== Cast ==
- Kristine De Bell as Alice
- Larry Gelman as the White Rabbit
- Alan Novak as the Mad Hatter
- Terri Hall (Terry Hall) as Nurse
- Jason Williams as the White Knight
- Ron Nelson as William
- Bucky Searles as Humpty Dumpty / the Queen of Hearts' Brother
- Gila Havana as the Black Knight's Girl
- J. P. Paradine as Judge / Scrugg
- Bree Anthony and Tony Richards as Tweedledum and Tweedledee
- Angel Barrett
- Nancy Dare as Nurse
- Bruce Finklesteen as the Black Knight
- Juliet Graham as the Queen of Hearts
- Astrid Hayase as Tart
- John Lawrence as the King of Hearts
- Ed Marshall
- Melvina Peoples
- Marcia Raven
- Chris Steen as Oogaloo

== Musical numbers ==
- "Whole New World"
- "(Guess I Was Just Too Busy) Growing Up"
- "If You Haven't Got Dreams, You Ain't Got Nothing (19 Going on 90)"
- "His Ding-A-Ling Is Up"
- "Tweedledee and Tweedledum's Song"
- "What's a Nice Girl Like You Doing on a Knight Like This?"
- "Cards, Cards, Cards"
- "Make Each and Every Movement Count"
- "Happy Love"
- "Whole New World" (Reprise)

== Production ==
Actor and director Jason Williams conceived the idea of producing an adult reimagining of Alice's Adventures in Wonderland by Lewis Carroll, proposing that it be an "X-rated musical" following in the style of the sex comedy Flesh Gordon, in which he had starred. Williams pitched the film to producer William Osco, who liked the idea, hired comedian Bucky Searles to write the screenplay and songs, and raised $100,000 for the production.

Production took place in New York City. Williams ran an ad in the Village Voice seeking auditions for an "X-rated musical", instructing that applicants "must be able to sing and dance". Williams was too busy with other aspects of the production to direct the picture, so Bud Townsend was hired as director. Townsend, whom Williams had met auditioning for his horror film Terror at Red Wolf Inn, was a prolific director of television commercials. Though Townsend had never directed a sex film before, he was hired to helm Alice in Wonderland, along with his wife, Patty, who served as the script supervisor. The dancing was choreographed by Buddy Schwab, a successful choreographer with Broadway credits. The film was initially going to be shot on 16mm film, but Townsend talked the producers into filming on 35mm film.

Juliet Graham auditioned for the role of Alice, but was offered the role of the Queen of Hearts instead, which she accepted. Through a modeling agency, Kristine De Bell was cast as Alice. The 20-year-old fashion model had a background in musical theater, and could sing and dance. Many of the actors were regulars of New York's porn scene, while others were prominent film and television character actors such as Larry Gelman, a friend of the screenwriter, who agreed to play the White Rabbit if he didn't have to appear nude, and if his wife and children could be flown out to New York on the production's budget. The auditions for singing and dancing performers primarily emphasized the actors' dancing abilities, as the producers planned to re-record most of the singing with professional singers.

The film was shot in just ten days in either June or July 1975. During filming, most of the actors stayed in the house used in the picture. A scratch track of the film's musical numbers was used for the actors to lip synch to during filming.

The initial plan was to produce the film as hardcore, but once filming commenced Williams said, "The vision for the film rapidly started expanding. We had these big sets, elaborate design, and we had this big opportunity. So we had this relatively short shooting schedule and we didn't have much time to go in and do a lot of close-up stuff that you need for hardcore," so the sex scenes were filmed in wide shots. De Bell performed in an unsimulated lesbian sex scene with Juliet Graham.

Cast and crew described Osco as being an intimidating figure, with Juliet Graham saying that Osco threatened not to pay her if she didn't spend an evening in his hotel room, and she did, but didn't have sex with him, telling Osco she was the girlfriend of porn actor Jamie Gillis. Osco convinced De Bell to allow him to film her performing oral sex on Osco, saying it was necessary for the film.

The film's budget was entirely spent on filming, and the production company Kaleidoscope Films provided $250,000 to $300,000 for the film's post-production. Musician and composer Peter Matz re-recorded the film's songs in full orchestral arrangements, and post-production was completed by the end of 1975.

== Release ==
The premiere was held on Times Square in 1976, at an event attended by Andy Warhol. Despite positive feedback, the producers were unable to interest a distributor due to an unwillingness to release a sex film, so Williams and Osco formed a new company for distribution, General National, explaining, "At that time, there was a company called 'National General' [...] so if we just call ourselves 'General National' everybody will think it's the same damn big company, and we'll get treated in the same way." For general release, three minutes were removed, and the MPAA gave it a R rating. In April before the film's release, De Bell appeared on the cover of Playboy. Osco sold foreign rights to multiple companies within the same territories, telling each distributor they had exclusive rights.

Because of the film's title, its poster was required to include a warning that it was not to be confused with other "traditional" Alice in Wonderland film adaptations and that this particular film could only be seen by adults.

The film grossed over $90 million globally. According to De Bell, the film grossed over $100 million, and although she told an interviewer she had 1% ownership, she did not see any of the profits.

After Alice in Wonderland was released as softcore, Osco re-edited the film as hardcore, inserting explicit penetration shots not part of the original filming, including footage of De Bell performing oral sex on Osco, which was edited into the Mad Hatter sequence. Subsequently, multiple people in the production, as well as Kaleidoscope Films, sued Osco, who had not paid some of them and had stolen money from others. Kaleidoscope ended up owning the rights as a result of the lawsuit. Osco had prints stolen so he could redistribute it without the owners' permission. The film's R-rated and hardcore versions were distributed on VHS, and in 2007, Subversive Cinema released a DVD containing both versions.

== Lawsuit ==
In October 1976, lawyers for the Taconic Park Commission threatened a lawsuit against Osco after finding out he had filmed on historical sites without permission. A month later, the film was reviewed by film critic Roger Ebert, who wrote, "Maybe because I went with low expectations, I found the movie a pleasant surprise. And its most pleasant surprise is its star, Kristine De Bell, who projects such a freshness and naivete that she charms us even in scenes where some rather alarming things are going on. I think she has a future in the movies, and not just X movies, either; there's an openness to her expression, a directness to her acting, that's genuinely appealing."

== Legacy ==
Williams and Osco planned to make an adult film based on The Wonderful Wizard of Oz as a follow-up, but it was not produced. Subsequently, Williams, Osco and De Bell made the film The Great American Girl Robbery (a.k.a. Cheerleaders' Wild Weekend). Williams and Osco also planned to produce an American Graffiti-style film, and Pee Wee Pigskin, a Bad News Bears-inspired football film with children.

== Adaptations ==
In January 2004, Osco oversaw an off-Broadway musical adaptation of Alice in Wonderland at the Kirk Theatre, New York. The production, entitled Alice in Wonderland: An Adult Musical Comedy, features an original score by TayWah and advertising that it is "for mature audiences only" and "contains full nudity". The show is set in a Weehawken, New Jersey trailer park and follows Alice's sexual awakening as she "escapes her boyfriend's advances and mother's drunken rants" into a new erotic world.

Filmmaker Ken Russell planned a remake of the 1976 film, and co-wrote a screenplay alongside Osco. However, Russell died before it could be produced. As of December 2011, Russell's widow and Osco were still moving forward with the remake's production, as a tribute to Russell.
