= A History of the Blue Movie =

- Directed by: Alex de Renzy
- Starring: Candy Barr; Bonnie Holiday
- Distributed by: Sherpix
- Release date: 1970
- Country: United States
- Language: English

A History of the Blue Movie is a 1970 documentary pornographic movie.

Directed by Alex de Renzy, this compilation of early shorts combines blue movies, dating from 1915 to 1970, with an uncredited narrator.

One of the first attempts to compile some of the oldest available American porn movies for a theater audience, A History of the Blue Movie includes scenes from Grass Sandwich (1915), which is one of the earliest known blue movies in existence, along with several classics in their entirety, such as the controversial The Nun Story, Ever Ready, The Janitor, Peeping Tom, and Smart Alec (1951) with legendary stripper Candy Barr.

== See also ==
- Blue Movie – Andy Warhol film (1969)
- Golden Age of Porn
- List of American films of 1970
