= Smart Alec (1951 American film) =

1951 pornographic film

Smart Alec, aka Smart Aleck, is a 1951 pornographic film. The silent short, which is no more than 20 minutes in length and was filmed in black-and-white, was one of the most famous and widely circulated of the early underground pornographic era. It has been called "iconographic", "the best known of all American stag films", and the "apogee of the American stag tradition". The leading actress, then known as Juanita Slusher, a buxom young woman of age 16 who appeared substantially older, later went on to fame as the stripper Candy Barr. Barr was working as a prostitute at the time, and was forced to feature in the film by one of her clients. At the time there was a rumour that the man was Gary Crosby, son of Bing Crosby. It was shot in a Dallas hotel, which was the setting for several other pornographic shorts of the period. Other sources, such as the Internet Movie Database, report that the stag film was shot in San Antonio and the young Juanita was inveigled into appearing in it by a patron of a Dallas strip club where she worked as a cigarette girl and had sex with generous tippers.

Barr herself told a men's magazine that she made the stag film because she was broke and hungry. “I went to the address a friend gave me. The man behind the desk looked me over. He told me I had a great figure. Then he explained he wanted me to act in a risqué film. Then he opened his wallet and counted a bunch of ten-dollar bills. He counted them out on the desk before me, one by one. The purse I clutched in my hands contained exactly seven cents. I made the film."

The film led to Barr being called "the first porn star". With Barr's cooperation the FBI prosecuted the producer for exploitation of a minor. Barr later sued Playboy magazine when it printed a still from the film. Luke Ford, the gossip columnist who wrote A History of X: 100 Years of Sex in Film, said of the stag film "It ruined her life. She regretted it all her days."

“Only when my hunger was gone could I think straight. But I was still too young to understand fully just what I had done," Barr told the men's magazine. "I’m still sick with shame over what I did, but when you’re (young) and all alone and your insides are crying for food, you can’t always figure out right from wrong.”

The film is included in many compilations of historic pornographic films. Smart Alec was among the films featured in Alex De Renzy's A History of the Blue Movie in 1970. It was later made available on video under the title Smokers of the Past, Vol. 1.

== Synopsis ==
A traveling salesman meets a beautiful young girl (Barr) by a motel swimming pool and picks her up. They go to his room for drinks and a good time.

They have sexual intercourse. He performs cunnilingus on her, but when he wants her to perform fellatio she refuses. When the salesman attempts to force her to perform the sex act against her will, she fights back. He jumps off the bed and sulks. She gets off the bed to comfort him, then calls a girlfriend and asks her to come over to join them. The other young woman arrives at the motel room and fellates him. Then he positions the girlfriend in the 69 position to perform cunnilingus on her while she continues to fellate him. His original lover joins them, and straddles his face while the girlfriend keeps fellating him. The man performs cunnilingus on her and seems to ejaculate in the girlfriends mouth. The women then go sit at his side while the satisfied man lies down and relaxes.
