= On the Good Ship Enterprise: My 15 Years with Star Trek =

Book written by Bjo Trimble

On the Good Ship Enterprise: My 15 Years with Star Trek is a book written by Bjo Trimble.

== Contents ==
On the Good Ship Enterprise is a book containing anecdotes and trivia about Star Trek.

== Reception ==
Dave Langford reviewed On the Good Ship Enterprise for White Dwarf #41, and stated that "the book froths with too much uncritical enthusiasm and too much exclamation marks for comfortable reading."

== Reviews ==
- Review by Steve Miller (1983) in Science Fiction Review, Summer 1983
- Review by Robert Coulson (1983) in Amazing Stories, September 1983
