= King's Ball =

Christian tradition

Coordinates: 37.97696°N 90.048672°W

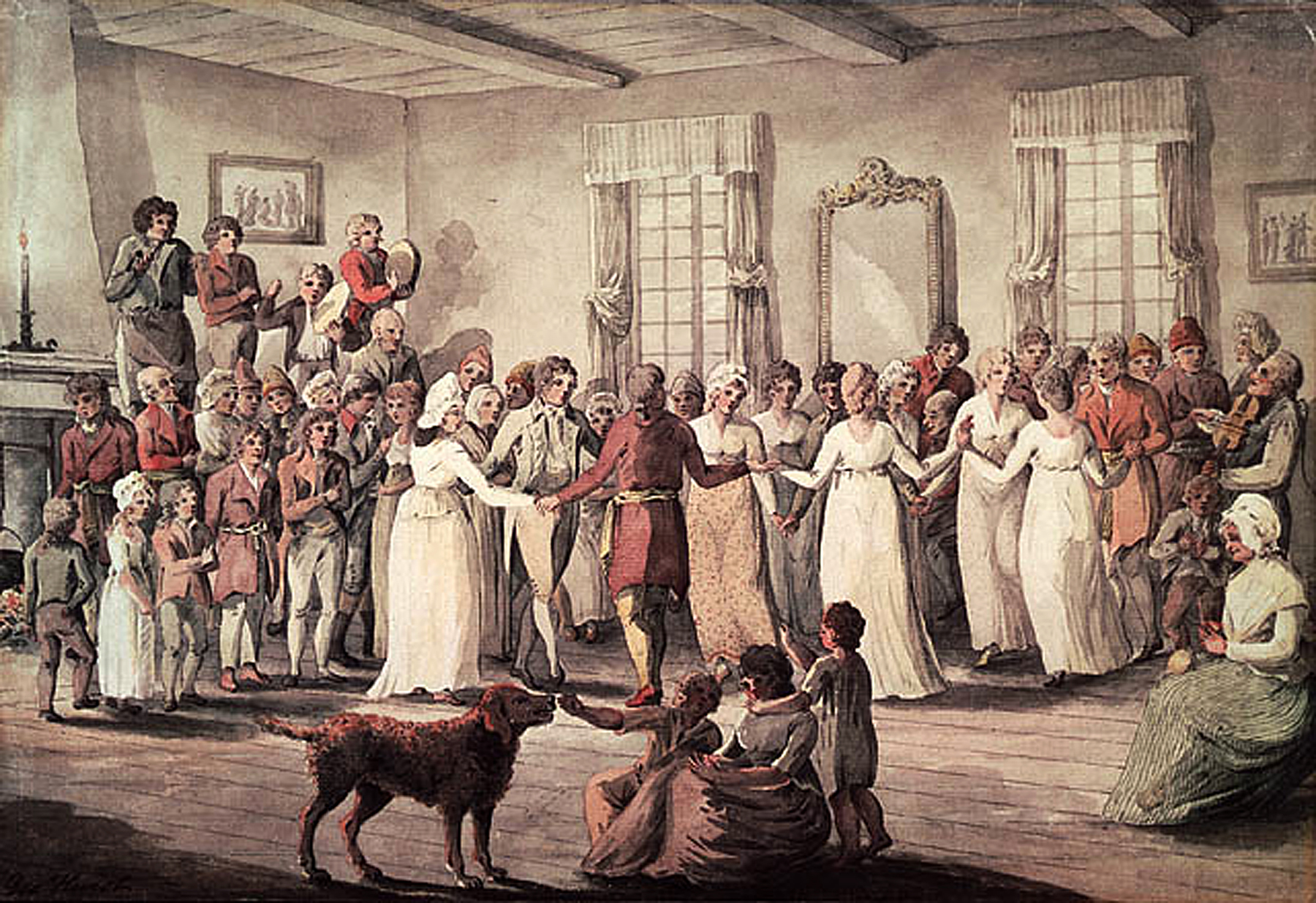
Dance in the Château St. Louis, Quebec (1801). Artist: George Heriot (ca. 1759-1839) Watercolor over pencil National Archives of Canada, Ottawa (Accession No. 1989-472-1)

In New France and in modern Missouri, a King's Ball is a celebration held on Epiphany (La fête des rois), or some later time before Lent.

The tradition was brought to the New World by Catholic émigrés. The parties lasted throughout the night and into the next day, when a late morning breakfast was served. Music, dancing and fine food were always important elements of the event. But the centerpiece of the annual celebration was the selection of the royal personage.

As in other European Epiphany celebrations, a Galette des Rois was baked, with a bean hidden in it. The man who found the bean in his slice was crowned King of the festivities; he selected his Queen, and they reigned over the year's festivities. More recently, a small Christ child trinket has been substituted for the bean.

In the old French towns of Upper Louisiana, at the feast of Epiphany, on Twelfth Night a cake was served to the ladies, into which had been kneaded, before the baking, four beans. Each lady whose slice of cake contained a bean became a queen of the revels, and she in turn chose, a gentleman to be her king, signifying her preference by presenting him a bouquet. The four kings thus chosen and duly proclaimed became the patrons of the first of a series of old-time entertainments known as the "kings' balls." At the Twelfth Night festival the time was fixed for the first of these balls, and at the close of this ball the queens selected four more kings, who, in turn, proclaimed four new queens for the next ball. The series of festivities thus inaugurated lasted until Shrove Tuesday and the carnival. All who were present at the Twelfth Night festivities were expected to attend the king's balls without further bidding.

About the 6th of January, in each year, which is called Le Jour de Rais, a party is given, and four beans are baked in a large cake; this cake is distributed amongst the gentlemen, and each one who receives a bean, is proclaimed king. These four kings are to give the next ball. These are called "king balls." These kings select each one a queen, and make her a suitable present. They arrange all things necessary for the dancing party. In these merry parties, no set supper is indulged in. They go there not to eat, but to be and make merry. They have refreshments of cake and coffee served round at proper intervals. Sometimes bouillon, as the French call it, takes the place of coffee. Toward the close of the party, the old queens select each one a new king, and kisses him to qualify him into office; then each new king chooses his new queen, and goes thro' the ceremony as before. In this manner the king balls are kept up all the carnaval.
