= Spelunker World =

2015 video game

- English Logo
- Developer: Tozai Games
- Publisher: Square Enix
- Engine: Unity
- Platforms: PlayStation 4 PlayStation Vita
- Release: PlayStation 4: JP: March 19, 2015; NA: November 11, 2015; PlayStation Vita: JP: May 21, 2015
- Genre: Platform
- Modes: Single-player, multiplayer

Spelunker World (Note: Known in Japan as Minna de Spelunker Z (Japanese: みんなでスペランカーZ, Hepburn: Min'na de Superankā Zē, lit. Everyone's Spelunker Z).) was a free-to-play platform video game developed by Tozai Games and published by Square Enix. It is a sequel to Spelunker HD with many of its gameplay elements carried over, most notably its six-player multiplayer mode. Originally released on the PlayStation 4's PlayStation Store in 2015, it was later made available for the PlayStation Vita in May of the same year. The downloadable title later received a retail release in the name of Spelunker Party!, (Note: Known in Japan as Minna de Waiwai! Spelunker (Japanese: みんなでワイワイ！スペランカー, Hepburn: Min'na de Waiwai! Superankā, lit. Everyone's Hype! or Everyone's Party! Spelunker).) for Nintendo Switch and Microsoft Windows, with the freemium elements removed. The Japanese version of Spelunker Party! had a physical release on April 20, 2017, but the worldwide release for Nintendo Switch and Microsoft Windows, on October 19 of the same year, was downloadable only.

== Gameplay ==
The players could control one of the four playable characters (Spelunker, Spelunkette, Dark Spelunker, and Spelunkette's Sister) in an attempt to discover treasures and reach the end of the expedition area for each level. There were a total of 100 stages to select from on a large world map. The map had four distinct sections with 25 levels each. Some of the stages occasionally became event stages - dropping an unusual amount of in-game currency or event items. This included collaboration events featuring equipment based on other video game franchises. Once a stage was selected, the players had to navigate through the level by walking, jumping, and using tools at their disposal. The players could go on a solo expedition or join a six-player group online.

A finite amount of energy was available to the player's character and complete depletion would lead to death. Energy could be resupplied at checkpoints scattered throughout the cave. In case of deaths, the player's character respawned at the last checkpoint they passed through. Deaths were easily caused by the hazardous environment such as traps, creatures, and ghosts. The playable characters were also known as the weakest action heroes, and they could die if they jumped or fall from a slightly higher platform. Each level allowed for two revives and a third death resulted in a game over screen. A continue could be purchased with moon gems. In multiplayer mode, other players had to revive the player at last checkpoint even after they expended own lives, but they had to reach the player before the 30 second countdown ended.

Each cave was split into multiple sections, and the player was required to progress through them in order. Once a section was cleared, the player could not return to the previous area unless the level was restarted. Treasures known as Litho-orbs could be found throughout the level alongside items required for progression, such as colored keys that opened corresponding doors. Litho-orbs went through a process known as Litho-stone evaluation at the end of the stage. The orbs were broken apart to reveal the Litho-stone fragments hidden in them. The yield was randomized, but the players not received a duplicate fragment until it was used or sold. A storage space of 999 slots was available for the fragments.

Once all the fragments for a Litho-stone were gathered, the players could complete it manually to receive the indicated equipment. Head and body equipment were available alongside accessories and pets. Equipment were used to enhance and provide new abilities for the playable characters, but some equipment were specific to certain characters. An inventory box was available for equipment that offered 30 slots initially. The players could expand the box by five slots for every 100 moon gems. Moon gem was a premium currency purchasable through microtransactions. There were also in-game methods for earning them as well. Another currency, gold, could be obtained through normal gameplay. Gold was used to upgrade equipment.

Equipment was also gained through a method known as Doggie Digging. The feature could be accessed through the menu. The players could use in-game items, such as candies and cakes, to feed an orange spotted dog named Pooch, who will then dig up a completed equipment. If those items were unavailable, the player could use moon gems instead.

== Spelunker Party! ==
Spelunker Party!
- English logo
- Developer: Tozai Games
- Publisher: Square Enix
- Engine: Unity
- Platforms: Microsoft Windows; Nintendo Switch
- Release: Microsoft Windows: WW: October 19, 2017; Nintendo Switch: JP: April 20, 2017; WW: October 19, 2017
- Genre: Platform
- Modes: Single-player, multiplayer

Spelunker Party! is a revamped re-release of Spelunker World for Nintendo Switch and Microsoft Windows with the complete removal of free-to-play elements. All 100 stages from Spelunker World were included alongside new extra stages. The protagonist of the story was Spelunkette instead of Spelunker. The overworld was redesigned and separated into a world map and five stage maps. The main menu had also seen a redesign. Pooch returned to help dig up equipment. The gameplay largely remained the same, but Litho-stone fragments were specific to stages instead of being randomized drops. Player lives were extended to five. Collaboration events and equipment were not included in this release. Multiplayer had gone from six-player to four-player, but with the addition of split-screen offline multiplayer.

== Reception ==
Reception

Aggregate score
Aggregator	Score
Metacritic	NS: 65/100
