= James Bidgood (filmmaker) =

American filmmaker (1933–2022)

- Born: James Alan Bidgood; March 28, 1933; Stoughton, Wisconsin, U.S.
- Died: January 31, 2022 (aged 88); New York City, U.S.
- Occupations: Artist; photographer; filmmaker
- Notable work: Pink Narcissus (1971)

James Alan Bidgood (March 28, 1933 – January 31, 2022), also known by the pseudonym Les Folies des Hommes, was an American filmmaker, photographer and visual and performance artist, known for his highly stylized and homoerotic works.

== Life and career ==
James Alan Bidgood was born in Stoughton, Wisconsin, and grew up in Madison, Wisconsin. He moved to New York City in 1951, and attended Parsons The New School for Design in the late 1950s. His artistic output embraced a number of media and disciplines, including music, set and window design, and drag performance. He got his start performing at East Village drag club Club 82, using the stage name Terri Howe.

His interests led him to photography and film, and it is for this work that he is most widely known. His photographs are distinguished by an aesthetic of high fantasy and camp, inspired by an early interest in Florenz Ziegfeld, Folies Bergère, and George Quaintance. He wanted to bring artistry to gay male erotic photography, believing that the genre at the time he started out had not been pushed to its limits. He explained in a 2005 interview:

[•••] one day I [asked] why are all these boys standing in front of the same frigging fireplace with the same funny little piece of jersey over their dingies? You know, why aren't there sets and Folies Bergère? Why not this glory going on around them, and why aren't they being idealized, that way, rather than in a sort of tawdry way? I had a sensitivity about it, I just felt it should be "Ziegfeld!" you know. That's what it was about, he glorified the American girls supposedly ... well I sort of tried to do that with boys in my own little tiny way.

Bidgood released the film Pink Narcissus in 1971, after filming in his small apartment from 1963 to 1970. The film is a dialogue-free fantasy centered around a young and often naked man. The film took seven years to make, and Bidgood built all the sets and filmed the entire piece in his tiny apartment. He later removed his name from the film because he felt editors had changed his original vision. Consequently, the identity of the film's creator was only a matter of speculation for nearly three decades after its release, with Andy Warhol frequently floated as a candidate. It was not until 1998 that writer Bruce Benderson decided to investigate the matter, and eventually traced them to Bidgood, then living on 14th Street in Manhattan. Through a friend who was an agent, Benderson arranged publication of Bidgood's output under his own name for the first time and also wrote the first complete monograph on Bidgood, which was published by Taschen. Bidgood's film Pink Narcissus was re-released in 2003 by Strand Releasing.

When the pornographic film industry began to blossom in the early 1970s, Bidgood signed with Hand in Hand Films, a burgeoning gay production company with only a handful of films to its name, to produce his second film.

"Beyond These Doors" was to feature Bidgood's lush and colourful photography showcased in scenes of hardcore pornography. However, for unknown reasons, the film was only partially completed and is considered lost. One excerpt of an orgy scene from the film can be seen in the 1975 porn documentary "Good Hot Stuff," which showcases the footage under the working title "Baghdad." After the negative experience, Bidgood effectively left the film industry.

When a profile on Bidgood was written by Artforum in 2019, the author noted that at the time of publishing the piece, he "lives in poverty in New York City."

Bidgood's work is characterized by a heavy reliance on invention. His photographs feature elaborate sets built ground up from the materials of the theatre, fashion, design, and fine art. In a profile of the artist published in Aperture, Philip Gefter wrote,

Necessity was the mother of invention for Bidgood, who created elaborate photographic tableaux in his small midtown Manhattan studio apartment. His first erotic series was an underwater epic called Water Colors, made in the early 1960s, in which he used a dancer from Club 82 named Jay Garvin as his subject. The underwater atmosphere is completely fabricated; the bottom of the ocean was created with silver lame spread across the floor of Bidgood's apartment; he made the arch of a cave out of waxed paper, and fashioned red lame into the shape of a lobster. He coated Garvin with mineral oil and pasted glitter and sequins to his skin so the silver fabric under photographic lights would reflect on his body like water. For weeks at a time, Bidgood would eat and sleep within the sets he constructed in his apartment.

Many contemporary themes are found even in the earliest of Bidgood's work. Camp, identity, erotica, desire, marginality, and performance all figure heavily in his portraits of nude men. Bidgood's complex references to the theatre and performance seem to presage Queer articulations of Performance. His techniques, working processes, and masterful use of illusionistic color indicate both a mature understanding of his influences and goals and an important contrast to the art movements of the time the work was first created. In 1999, the art book publisher Taschen published a monograph of his work including biographical images and stills from his film.

In 2005, Bidgood was honored with a Creative Capital grant which facilitated a return to art photography after a hiatus of nearly 40 years. His later projects include work for Christian Louboutin and Out magazine. In 2008, Taschen included an interview with Bidgood in its publication The Big Penis Book, and published his monograph in 2009. Bidgood's more recent work was featured in Out in February 2009. Bidgood was represented by ClampArt in New York City, as well as Larry Collins Fine Art in Provincetown, Massachusetts.

Bidgood died from complications of COVID-19 at a Manhattan hospital, on January 31, 2022, at age 88.

Bidgood is often credited as inspiration for photographic artists, including Pierre et Gilles and David LaChapelle. He was also an inspiration for and once collaborated with designer Christian Louboutin.

== Personal life ==
Bidgood met his partner Alan Blair in 1975. They were together for 10 years until Blair's death in 1985.
