= Halloween (video game) =

1983 video game

- Developer: MicroGraphicImage
- Publisher: Wizard Video
- Designers: Tim Martin; Robert Barber
- Platform: Atari 2600
- Release: October 1983
- Genre: Action
- Mode: Single-player

Halloween is a horror video game for the Atari 2600, released in October 1983 by Wizard Video. It is based on the 1978 horror film of the same name. The game was programmed by Tim Martin. When Games by Apollo went bankrupt, Martin and another former employee, Robert Barber, developed Halloween.

Although the game was called Halloween, and featured the film's theatrical poster as its cover art as well as the movie's main music theme, the game itself never refers to any characters, including the killer, by their names in the film.

== Gameplay ==
Screenshot showing the killer (top center), the babysitter (top right) and a child (bottom center)

In 1983, Halloween was adapted as a video game for the Atari 2600 by Wizard Video. None of the main characters in the game were named. Players take on the role of a teenage babysitter (Laurie Strode) who tries to save as many children from an unnamed, knife-wielding killer (Michael Myers) as possible. In another effort to save money, most versions of the game did not even have a label on the cartridge. It was simply a piece of tape with "Halloween" written in marker. The game contained more gore than the film, however. When the babysitter is killed, her head disappears and is replaced by blood pulsating from the neck as she runs around exaggeratedly. The game's primary similarity to the film is the theme music that plays when the killer appears onscreen.

The player obtains points in two ways: by rescuing children and taking them to "safe rooms" located at both ends of each floor of the house, and by stabbing the killer with the knife (if it can be located). The player advances a level either by rescuing five children or stabbing the killer twice. The killer gets faster with each level increase, and the game continues until all of the player's three lives are lost.

== Development ==
Film director Charles Band was in the film industry by the mid-1970s. Having difficult experiences with distributors, he created an independent home video company called Media Home Entertainment in 1978. and shortly after, Wizard Video.

Band said he saw how well Atari, Inc. had been doing during the early 1980s with their video games. Around that time, Band had already licensed home video rights to the films The Texas Chainsaw Massacre (1974) and Halloween (1978) for home video release.

== Release and reception ==
Reception

Review score
Publication	Score
AllGame	2.5/5

Wizard Video presented The Texas Chainsaw Massacre and Halloween at the Winter Consumer Electronics Show (CES) held in Las Vegas in January 1983. Both games were incomplete at the time of this presentation. Both games were initially announced to be released March 1, 1983, for the Atari 2600. Tom Shea of InfoWorld wrote in February 1983 that versions would be made for the Atari 400 and 800 computers and the Commodore's VIC-20 by June.

Halloween had a slightly better reception than their The Texas Chainsaw Massacre, although the limited number of copies sold has made both games highly valued items among Atari collectors.

In a retrospective review from the online game database AllGame, the reviewer said that most attempts at creating a mature-themed games for the Atari 2600 in the early 1980s were predominantly crude in terms of quality and handling the subject matter. They found that Halloween was among the best of these attempts despite repetitive gameplay and "cartoonish stabs at violence" it was able to create a certain level of suspense.

== Aftermath ==
Nick Montfort and Ian Bogost wrote in Racing the Beam (2009) that both Halloween and The Texas Chainsaw Massacre (1983) were designed to create controversy, the Atari 2600 was already suffering the effects of the video game crash of 1983 and both titles "didn't manage to create much of a stir."
