= The Texas Chainsaw Massacre (1983 video game) =

1983 video game

- TTCM Atari 2600 box art
- Developers: VSS, Inc.
- Publisher: Wizard Video Games
- Designer: Ed Salvo
- Platform: Atari 2600
- Release: March 14, 1983
- Genre: Action
- Mode: Single-player

The Texas Chainsaw Massacre is a video game for the Atari 2600 based on the film of the same name. The game was released in March 1983 by Wizard Video Games. It was designed and programmed by VSS, a software development company started by Ed Salvo and several other ex-Games by Apollo programmers.

== Gameplay ==
The player, Leatherface, approaching a victim

The player takes on the role of the movie's chainsaw-wielding villain, Leatherface, and attempts to murder trespassers while avoiding obstacles such as fences, wheelchairs, and cow skulls. The player controls the murderer with the objective to chase and kill victims. Each victim slain gives the player 1,000 points. The player receives additional fuel at every 5,000 points (5 victims). A life is lost when the player's chainsaw runs out of gasoline. Gameplay ends when the last tank of gas is consumed.

== Reception ==
As one of the first horror-themed video games, The Texas Chainsaw Massacre caused controversy when it was released because of the violent nature of the video game and sold poorly; many stores refused to carry it. Wizard's other commercial release, Halloween, was also not well-received.

== Reviews ==
- Electronic Fun with Computers & Games - October 1983

== See also ==
- List of controversial video games
