= Wizard Video =

American motion picture distribution company

Wizard Video Logo

Wizard Video was a home video distribution company formed by B movie producer Charles Band in the early 1980s. It was well-known for its detailed (and often lurid) box art, especially during the time that it sold videocassettes in larger individual boxes. Its VHS releases included Zombi 2, The Texas Chainsaw Massacre, and I Spit on Your Grave.

== History ==
Wizard Video was a subsidiary of Avex Pictures, a small film studio founded by Band after he left Media Home Entertainment. Wizard's videocassettes were originally duplicated by the company Sound/Video Unlimited.

From 1982 to 1983, Wizard's releases were distributed by Family Home Entertainment. Empire also distributed films under the Force Video and Cult Video labels during this time.

Subsequently, Spectrum Video became Wizard's distribution partner. In 1985, Empire revived the Force Video label, and Lightning Video, a subsidiary of Vestron Video, agreed to distribute Force Video's releases. The distribution agreement with Lightning would be extended to the Wizard label in 1986.

In 1987, Empire formed a new division, Urban Classics, which distributed films both theatrically, and subsequently on video.

Wizard also released two Atari 2600 video games, The Texas Chainsaw Massacre and Halloween, under the label Wizard Video Games. They initially also planned an unreleased video game based on Flesh Gordon, an pornographic parody of Flash Gordon. These games were intended for adults, and had violent content. Many retailers refused to sell them. Those that did often kept them behind the counter and only made them available upon request. As a result, sales were poor, and Wizard released no further games apart from a single computer game, Movie Trivia Quiz.

Empire and its video labels shuttered in 1988. Band went on to found Full Moon Productions, which would later resurrect the Wizard Video and Cult Video labels.

On February 7, 2013, Wizard claimed that a large quantity of printed but unused "big box" packages, representing 36 titles, had been found in a warehouse. The company began selling these boxes, with newly manufactured videocassettes and inner packaging, as limited-edition collector's items. Wizard would reduce the number of titles that it would offer from 36 to 32, asserting that the boxes for the remaining titles had been damaged by water, and "were in unsalvageable condition". There were allegations, however, that these boxes, sold as originals, were actually reproductions. Supposedly found along with the videocassette packages were unused boxes for Wizard's two video game titles. The company planned to release these as well, at some later date.

In 2014, the Wizard Video brand was re-launched as Wizard Studios "to spotlight rising independent filmmakers and their cutting-edge genre pictures". The first set of films, Virginia Obscura, Vampie, and Villanelle, premiered on Full Moon's subscription-based streaming service.

== List of movies released by Wizard Video ==
- L'abîme des morts vivants (a.k.a. Oasis of the Zombies) (1981)
- Auditions (1978)
- Bad Georgia Road (1977)
- The Best of Sex and Violence (1981)
- Beyond Atlantis (1973)
- The Boogeyman (1980)
- Breeders (1986)
- Il camorrista (a.k.a. The Professor) (1986)
- Carnival of Blood (1970)
- Come rubare un quintale di diamanti in Russia (a.k.a. Mission Phantom) (1967)
- Crystal Voyager (1975)
- Day of the Woman (a.k.a. I Spit on Your Grave) (1978)
- Dirty Hands (a.k.a. Innocent With Dirty Hands) (1975)
- Dixie Dynamite (1976)
- Don Juan (or, If Don Juan Were a Woman) (a.k.a. Ms. Don Juan) (1975)
- Dreamaniac (1986)
- The Driller Killer (1979)
- Elsa Fräulein SS (a.k.a. Fraulein Devil) (1977)
- Emanuelle bianca e nera (a.k.a. Emanuelle Black and White) (1976)
- Emanuelle - Perché violenza alle donne? (a.k.a. Emanuelle Around the World) (1977)
- Equinox (1970)
- Female Trouble (1974)
- Femmine infernali (a.k.a. Escape) (1980)
- The Great McGonagall (1974)
- Blood Brothers (1974)
- Gyakushu! Satsujin ken (a.k.a. The Street Fighter's Last Revenge) (1974)
- The Harrad Experiment (1973)
- The Headless Eyes (1971)
- Kung Fu Brothers in the Wild West (a.k.a. The Master Killers) (1973)
- Le Lac des Morts Vivants (a.k.a. Zombie Hunt) (1981)
- Lager SSadis Kastrat Kommandantur (a.k.s. S.S. Experiment) (1976)
- The Mafu Cage (1981)
- Mandinga (1976)
- Miss Nude America (1976)
- I misteri della giungla nera (a.k.a. The Snake Hunter Strangler) (1965)
- La montagna del dio cannibale (a.k.a. Slave of the Cannibal God) (1978)
- Mutant Hunt (1987)
- La nuit des étoiles filantes (a.k.a. A Virgin Among the Living Dead) (1973)
- Onna hissatsu ken (a.k.a. Sister Street Fighter) (1974)
- La orgia de los muertos (a.k.a. Return of the Zombies) (1973)
- Parasite (1982)
- Penitentiary (1980)
- Phenomenal and the Treasure of Tutankhamen (1968)
- Pink Flamingos (1972)
- Il plenilunio delle vergini (a.k.a. The Devil's Wedding Night) (1973)
- Psychos in Love (1987)
- Revenge in the House of Usher (1982)
- Robot Holocaust (1986)
- Rosso Sangue (a.k.a. Monster Hunter) (1982)
- The Tattooed Hitman (1977)
- Terminal Island (1977)
- The Texas Chainsaw Massacre (1974)
- Train spécial pour SS (a.k.a. Helltrain) (1977)
- La vie amoureuse de l'homme invisible (a.k.a. The Invisible Dead) (1971)
- Willie Nelson's Fourth of July Celebration (1979)
- Zombie 2 (1979)
- Zombiethon (1986)

== List of movies released by Force Video (1982–83; 1985–86) ==
Note: Films with an "FV" code are from the original 1982–83 era; the "FA" code is from the 1985–86 revival era.

- FV-1 Two Thousand Maniacs! (1964)
- FV-2 Zombies (a.k.a. I Eat Your Skin) (1964)
- FV-3 Fiend (1980)
- FV-4 Contes immoraux (a.k.a. Immoral Tales) (1973)
- FV-5 Filmgore (1983)
- FV-6 The Single Girls (a.k.a. Private School) (1974)
- FV-7 Hi-Riders (1978)
- FA-7500 I pirati della Malesia (a.k.a. Pirates of the Seven Seas) (1964)
- FA-7501 Orazi e Curiazi (a.k.a. Duel of Champions) (1961)
- FA-7502 Eroi all'inferno (a.k.a. Heroes in Hell) (1973)
- FA-7503 Karzan, il favoloso uomo della jungla (a.k.a. Jungle Master) (1972)
- FA-7504 Il boia di Venezia (a.k.a. The Executioner of Venice) (1963)
- FA-7505 Brenno il nemico di Roma (a.k.a. Battle of the Valiant) (1963)
- FA-7506 Savage Island (1985)
- FA-7507 L'arbitro (a.k.a. Playing the Field) (1974)
- FA-7508 Nefertite, regina del Nilo (a.k.a. Queen of the Nile and Nefertiti, Queen of the Nile) (1961)
- FA-7509 Les avaleuses (a.k.a. Erotic Kill) (1973)
- FA-7510 La tigre dei sette mari (a.k.a. Tiger of the Seven Seas) (1962)
- FA-7511 Isabella, Duchess of the Devils (a.k.a. Ms. Stiletto) (1969)
- FA-7512 Schiave bianche: violenza in Amazzonia (a.k.a. White Slave) (1985)
- FA-7513 Schlock (a.k.a. Banana Monster) (1973)
- FA-7514 Mister Zehn Prozent - Miezen und Moneten (a.k.a. The Psychopath) (1968)
- FA-7515 Le Orme (a.k.a. Primal Impulse) (1975)
- FA-7516 12 + 1 (a.k.a. The Thirteen Chairs) (1969)
- FA-7517 Il gladiatore Invincibile (a.k.a. The Invisible Gladiator) (1961)
- FA-7518 Comando al infierno (a.k.a. Hell Commandos) (1969)
- FA-7519 L'avventuriero della Tortuga (a.k.a. Cold Steel of Tortuga) (1965)
- FA-7524 Sandokan contro il leopardo di Sarawak (a.k.a. Throne of Vengeance) (1964)
- FA-7525 Cartagine in Fiamme (a.k.a. Carthage in Flames) (1960)

== List of movies released by Cult Video (1982–83) ==
- C01 Smooth Velvet, Raw Silk (1976)
- C02 The Twilight People (1972)
- C03 Night Creature (1978)
- C04 The Cars That Ate Paris (1974)
- C05 Snuff (1976)
- C06 Blood Feast (1963)
- C07 Drive-In Massacre (1977)
- C08 Famous T&A (1982)
- C09 Sweet Sugar (a.k.a. She Devils in Chains) (1972)
- C10 Thirst (1979)
- C11 Curse of the Headless Horseman (1972)
- C12 Beast of the Yellow Night (1971)
- C13 Nuits Rouges (a.k.a. Shadowman) (1974)
- C14 Venom (a.k.a. The Legend of Spider Forest) (1971)
