= Kristine DeBell =

American actress

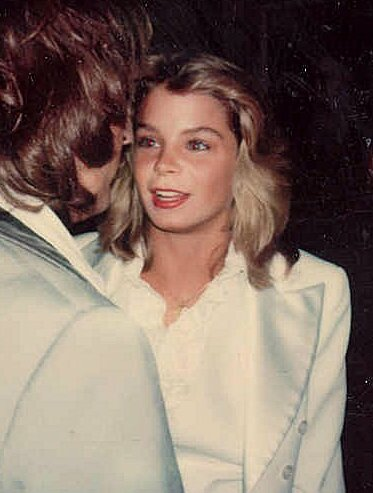
- DeBell at the premiere of the 1976 remake of A Star Is Born
- Born: December 10, 1954 (age 71); Chatham, New York, U.S.
- Other names: Kristine De Bell; Kristine De Belle
- Occupations: Actress; model
- Years active: 1976-present

Kristine DeBell (born December 10, 1954) is an American film actress.

== Career ==
Born in Chatham, New York, DeBell began her career as a fashion model with Ford Models. She later moved into acting, debuting as the star of the 1976 erotic musical comedy film Alice in Wonderland at the age of 21.

She was on the April 1976 cover of Playboy, photographed by Suze Randall. She also appeared in Playboy's classic August 1976 Helmut Newton pictorial "200 Motels, or How I Spent My Summer Vacation", from which 11 original prints were sold at auctions of the Playboy archives by Butterfields in 2002 for $21,075, and three by Christie's in December 2003 for $26,290.

Subsequently, she moved to mainstream film and television. Her most prominent film roles included playing A.L., a camp counselor, alongside Bill Murray, in the comedy Meatballs (1979) and Jackie Chan's girlfriend in The Big Brawl (1980). She appeared in a number of television pilots and individual episodes of various television series through the early 1980s. She returned to acting in 2012, appearing in a number of direct-to-video productions.

== Filmography ==
=== Film ===
Year	Title	Role	Notes
1976	Alice in Wonderland	Alice	Film debut
1977	Rooster: Spurs of Death!	Melody	
1978	I Wanna Hold Your Hand	Cindy	
1978	Bloodbrothers	Cheri	
1979	The Main Event	Lucy	
1979	Meatballs	A.L.	
1979	The Great American Girl Robbery	Debbie Williams	
1980	Willie & Phil	Rena	
1980	The Big Brawl	Nancy	
1981	Lifepod	Fiona	
1982	Tag: The Assassination Game	Nancy McCauley	
1986	Club Life	Fern	
1990	American Confidential	Katy Lynn O'Toole	Video; short
2012	1313: Night of the Widow	The Widow	Voice; video
2012	Southern dysComfort	Cousin Deb	Short
2013	Beyond Sunset and Sunrise	Norma Desmond / The Good Witch / Narrator	Short
2013	A Talking Cat!?!	Susan	Direct-to-video
2013	An Easter Bunny Puppy	Jennifer	Direct-to-video
2013	A Talking Pony!?!	Kim	Direct-to-video
2014	3 Wicked Witches	Lana	
2014	Trophy Heads	Sister Jasmine	
2015	Hunter	Capt. Goodwill	
2015	Samurai Cop 2: Deadly Vengeance	Bobbie	
2016	Offer and Compromise	Executive	
2017	Darling Nikki		
2019	Merrily	Cynthia	

=== Television ===
Year	Title	Role	Notes
1973	The Young and the Restless	Pam Warren #2	TV series
1978	Police Woman	Francine	"The Young and the Fair"
1978	Deadman's Curve	Girl at Birthday Party (uncredited)	TV movie
1978	James at 16	Cheryl	"Rebel Without a Car"
1978	B. J. and the Bear	Marcia	"The Foundlings"
1978	Katie: Portrait of a Centerfold	Sally South	TV movie
1978	Suddenly, Love	Helen Malloy	TV movie
1978	Eight Is Enough	Melanie	"Alone at Last"
1978	David Cassidy: Man Undercover	Girl	"RX for Dying"
1979	Barnaby Jones	Rita Wallace	"Man on Fire"
1979	CHiPs	Peggy	"Second Chance"
1981	The Misadventures of Sheriff Lobo	Ginger	"The French Follies Caper"
1982	Life of the Party: The Story of Beatrice	Toni Blasdell	TV movie
1983	For Members Only	Ginger Blakely	TV movie
1983	Oh Madeline	...	"All the World's a Stage"
1983	Oh Madeline	...	"To Ski or Not to Ski "
1984	Night Court	Jennifer Black	"Harry and the Rock Star"
2012	The Great Halloween Puppy Adventure	Linda	TV movie
2017	The Wrong Man	Sarah Franklin	TV-14 movie
