= William Dennis Hunt =

American actor (1944–2020)

William Dennis Hunt (March 1, 1944 – June 14, 2020) was an American actor. He was known for his role as Emperor Wang the Perverted in Flesh Gordon (1974) and Flesh Gordon Meets the Cosmic Cheerleaders (1990). He is also the only actor to appear in both Flesh Gordon films.

He portrayed the Klingon Huraga in the Star Trek: Deep Space Nine episode "The Way of the Warrior". Other television credits include: L.A. Law (1992, with Amy Benedict, Timothy Carhart, Corbin Bernsen, and Larry Drake), Wings (1994, with Steven Weber), Babylon 5 (1995, with Bill Mumy and Andreas Katsulas), Frasier (1998, with Kelsey Grammer), Seven Days (2000, with Norman Lloyd and Alan Scarfe), Alias (2003, with Ahmed Best, Christian Slater, Lindsey Ginter, Tracy Middendorf, and Terry O'Quinn) a recurring role as "Judge Edgar Byrnes" on NYPD Blue (2003, with Daniel Benzali and Don Stark).

His other film credits include Critters 3 (1991), Dr. Giggles (1992), Chaplin (1992), Lightning in a Bottle (1993), The Bacchae (2000), Dragonfly (2002), Evan Almighty (2007) and Life Inside Out (2014).

He died at 76 on June 14, 2020.
