= The Rialto Report =

Adult entertainment podcast and blog

Presentation
- Hosted by: Ashley West; April Hall
- Genre: Film
- Language: English
- Updates: Sundays
- Length: Variable

Production
- Audio format: MP3

Publication
- Original release: January 18, 2013

Related
- Website: www.therialtoreport.com

The Rialto Report is a podcast and article series documenting the Golden Age of Porn (1969–1984). It consists of oral history, audio, photo, and documentary archives. It is hosted by Ashley West and April Hall as well as guest contributors such as academics and writers with insight into the subjects covered. The series has interviewed notable golden age participants such as Ginger Lynn, Sharon Mitchell, Kay Parker, Jeff Stryker and Jennifer Welles. Starting in 2013, The Rialto Report podcast was initially released weekly but in 2015 shifted to a roughly monthly schedule.

Hosts West and Hall served as consultants to the HBO show The Deuce and as consulting producers on the Netflix show Crime Scene: The Times Square Killer.

== Format ==
The Rialto Report delivers content in three main formats:

- Podcasts are typically long-form interviews with performers, directors and distributors from the golden age of adult film. Interviews focus on the subjects' personal lives and candid memories of their experiences within the early adult industry.
- Investigative articles unearth information about the early adult industry, and the social and cultural context in which it operated.
- Photo essays of previously unpublished, rare photographs offer behind-the-scenes looks into the golden age industry and the people who were part of it.
