= Harlot (1971 film) =

- Directed by: Michael Benveniste; Howard Ziehm
- Written by: Walter R. Cichy; Howard Ziehm
- Produced by: Bill Osco
- Starring: Fran Spector; Patty Alexon; John McGaughtery
- Production company: Graffiti Productions
- Release date: 1971
- Running time: 64 minutes
- Country: United States
- Language: English

Harlot is a 1971 pornographic movie starring Fran Spector, produced by Bill Osco and directed by Michael Benveniste and Howard Ziehm. It is one of the early adult movies of the 1970s, and follows Mona (1970), the first mainstream adult film, also produced by Osco and directed by the team of Benveniste and Ziehm.

== Plot ==
The film depicts the story of a young female student involved in various sexual situations

== Home video release ==
Despite the bad quality of surviving copies, the film has been reprinted a few times also on DVD.

== See also ==
- List of American films of 1971
