= Flesh Gordon =

1974 film

- Special collector's DVD artwork by George Barr
- Directed by: Michael Benveniste; Howard Ziehm
- Written by: Michael Benveniste
- Produced by: Walter R. Cichy; Bill Osco; Howard Ziehm
- Starring: Jason Williams; Suzanne Fields; Joseph Hudgins; William Dennis Hunt; Candy Samples; Mycle Brandy; John Hoyt
- Narrated by: Robert V. Greene
- Cinematography: Howard Ziehm
- Edited by: Abbas Amin
- Music by: Ralph Ferraro
- Production company: Graffiti Productions
- Distributed by: Mammoth Films
- Release date: July 26, 1974
- Running time: 78 minutes 90 minutes (Collector's edition)
- Country: United States
- Language: English
- Budget: $470,000
- Box office: $5.3 million (US and Canadian rentals)

Flesh Gordon is a 1974 American science fiction sex comedy feature film, which is a spoof of Universal Pictures's first (of three) Flash Gordon serial films from the 1930s. The film was produced by Walter R. Cichy, Bill Osco, and Howard Ziehm. It was co-directed by Ziehm and Michael Benveniste, who also wrote the screenplay. The cast includes Jason Williams, Suzanne Fields, John Hoyt and William Dennis Hunt. It was distributed by Mammoth Films.

The storyline is reminiscent of the first Universal Pictures Flash Gordon serial Flash Gordon (1936), but written and directed with a purposely campy adult flavor. The planet Porno (in the serial: Mongo) and major characters are suggestive innuendos: the hero Flesh Gordon (Flash Gordon); his love interest Dale Ardor (Dale Arden); the evil Emperor Wang the Perverted (Ming the Merciless); scientist Dr. Flexi Jerkoff (Dr. Alexi Zarkov); seductive Amora, queen of Magic (Ming's daughter Aura); and gay Prince Precious (Prince Barin). The film features production values comparable to the original serial, but with stop-motion animation of creatures, frequent use of gratuitous nudity, and brief sex scenes.

== Plot ==
Distinguished Professor Gordon explains that Earth is being tormented by periodic "sex rays", which send people into a sexual frenzy. When one of the rays hits the passenger aircraft carrying Flesh Gordon and Dale Ardor, the pilots abandon the controls and everyone aboard has manic sex. Realizing no one is flying the plane, Flesh temporarily snaps out of the effects of the ray and tries to pilot the vehicle, to no avail. Seeing no other solution, he takes a parachute and escapes with Dale from the imminent crash. They land near the workshop of Dr. Flexi Jerkoff, who has a plan to stop the sex rays at their source.

They travel to the planet Porno aboard Jerkoff's phallic rocket ship, and are briefly hit by a sex ray, resulting in a frantic three-way orgy. After being shot down by the minions of Emperor Wang, the heroes crash land. They run away from their pursuers and enter a nearby cave, where several one-eyed Penisauruses attack them. Wang's soldiers then shoot down the creatures and imprison the earthlings. They are brought before Wang, who is presiding over a sex orgy of more than a dozen men and women. Jerkoff is sent to work in the palace's laboratory, while Wang announces his intention to marry Dale. Flesh is sentenced to death, but is saved from execution by Queen Amora, who takes him as her sex slave. To achieve this, Amora takes Flesh to her ship, which departs for the stars while she hypnotizes him and they make love.

Angry at her rebellious attitude, Wang shoots down Amora's airship, and Flesh is the only survivor. Jerkoff escapes the palace and reunites with Flesh, and they resume their efforts to defeat Emperor Wang. To aid them in their quest, Amora's spirit lends them her "power pasties", which turn out to be powerful weapons against Porno's soldiers. The heroes manage to interrupt Wang and Dale's wedding before it is fully realized, and a fight ensues. During it, Dale is kidnapped by Amazonian lesbians. Their leader, Chief Nellie, attempts to initiate Dale into their warrior sex cult. Flesh and Jerkoff save her, unexpectedly aided by Prince Precious of the Forest Kingdom.

With help from their new ally, Jerkoff builds a weapon to destroy the sex ray. During the mission, they confront Wang and trick his "rapist robots" into turning on him. However, Wang escapes, seeking the aid of the towering idol of the Great God Porno. Porno comes to life and captures Dale, doing a running commentary like a jaded hipster as they flee. Shooting the living idol, Jerkoff frees Dale and causes the god to fall on Wang. The crash destroys the sex ray and kills them both. Flesh, Dale, and Jerkoff are celebrated as heroes of the planet Porno, thank Prince Precious (the true heir of planet Porno) and return to Earth.

== Cast ==
- Jason Williams as Flesh Gordon
- Suzanne Fields as Dale Ardor
- Joseph Hudgins as Dr. Flexi Jerkoff
- William Dennis Hunt as Emperor Wang the Perverted
- John Hoyt as Professor Gordon
- Candy Samples as Chief Nellie
- Mycle Brandy as Prince Precious
- Nora Wieternik as Amora, Queen of Magic
- Lance Larsen as Guard for Emperor Wang
- Robert V. Greene (voice) as The Narrator
- Craig T. Nelson (uncredited voice) as The Great God Porno

== Production ==
Flesh Gordon was shot in 1971, and according to producer Bill Osco, cost $470,000 to make. Osco intended to hold out for a major distributor to pay a $1 million advance to secure the American release rights.

The film initially was assigned a MPAA rating of X, but was then re-edited, receiving a reclassified rating of R. The original running time was 78 minutes, but the later, unrated "collector's edition" video release runs 90 minutes.

Flesh Gordon employed special effects artists who later gained Hollywood fame, including Mike Minor, Greg Jein, and Rick Baker. Established effects artists Jim Danforth (listed backward in the credits as Mij Htrofnad) and Dave Allen also worked on the film. The low-budget special effects were achieved using old-fashioned techniques: For example, the model of Wang's palace was created using everyday objects, such as drinking glasses, and was designed to resemble Griffith Observatory so actual footage shot at the base of the observatory could be easily integrated into the scenes.

Los Angeles-area Star Trek fan and writer Bjo Trimble was a makeup artist on Flesh Gordon; she described these experiences in her book On the Good Ship Enterprise: My 15 Years with Star Trek. Other Los Angeles-area science fiction fans worked, at times, in various capacities on the film, including science fiction and fantasy artist George Barr who designed and illustrated the theatrical release poster, and Cornelius Cole III, who animated the opening title credits sequence. Longtime fan and science fiction and fantasy writer Tom Reamy served in the art department as the production's property master. He tracked down many of the screen-used props, including authentic, full-sized Ford Trimotor wicker passenger seats (matching the film's Tri-Motor aircraft miniature) used in an early scene.

The towering creature was not originally intended to speak, but it proved so expressive that dialogue was dubbed over to match its mouth movements. Addressed as the Great God Porno in this dialogue, the special effects crew named him Nesuahyrrah, a tribute to stop-motion animation master Ray Harryhausen, spelling his name backwards.

According to Ziehm's DVD audio commentary, the film was shot using scenes of straight and gay hardcore pornography. These were cut after Ziehm found himself in legal trouble: Producing pornography in Los Angeles was legally viewed as pandering at that time. The X-rated footage was surrendered to L.A. vice police. Although some explicit shots can be briefly seen during Wang's throne room orgy scenes, the "collector's edition" video, labelled "the original, uncensored version", is no more explicit than any of the earlier video releases.

Also according to Ziehm's DVD audio commentary, Universal Studios was planning to sue Graffiti Productions over the first part of Flesh Gordon being too similar to the first chapter of Universal's 1936 Flash Gordon serial film that it bordered on plagiarism. To avoid a lawsuit, Ziehm added an opening text scroll that stated that Flesh Gordon was a burlesque style parody of the Depression Era superheroes of America's past; he also added "Not to be confused with the original Flash Gordon" to all advertising materials.

== Critical reception ==
Vivian Sobchack commented that Flesh Gordon is "a skin flick hilariously molded around the Flash Gordon serials, and fully and lovingly aware of genre conventions from special effects to dialogue."

Vincent Canby of The New York Times wrote: "What wit the film possesses had gone into the physical production [...] The acting is broad, which may be as it should be, although it quickly becomes monotonous unless you have a high tolerance for contemporary camp." Variety was more pointed in its review: "Puerile is the word for this softcore spoof of the Sci-Fi serials of the 1930s. By attempting to combine sexplicity and low-level camp, pic emerges as an expensive-looking mish-mash of obvious double-entendres, idiotic characterizations and dull situations."

The film was nominated for the 1975 Hugo Award for Best Dramatic Presentation (the only indie production nominated that year), but lost to Mel Brooks' Young Frankenstein.

On Rotten Tomatoes the film has a rating of 67% based on reviews from 6 critics.

== Legacy ==
Wizard Video, notable for the Atari 2600 games Halloween and The Texas Chainsaw Massacre, planned a version for the Atari 2600 in 1983 that never released. The sequel Flesh Gordon Meets the Cosmic Cheerleaders was released in 1990. A four-issue comic book, written by Daniel Wilson and published by Aircel Comics, was published in 1992. Famous Flesh Gordon's was a strip club operating in London, Ontario. The club was closed in 2015 after the provincial government revoked its liquor license due to the owner's connection with the Hells Angels.

== See also ==
- List of American films of 1974
