= Bill Osco =

American film producer and director (born 1947)

- Born: 1947 (age 78–79); United States
- Occupations: Film producer, director, actor

Bill Osco (born William Osco in 1947) is an American film producer and director.

== Career ==
Osco's first production job (in an uncredited capacity) was the 1970 film Mona, one of the first adult films, after Andy Warhol's 1969 film Blue Movie, to receive a national theatrical release in the United States. The release of Mona is considered to be one of the watershed events that helped inaugurate the Golden Age of Porn in the United States.

That same year, Osco directed the documentary Hollywood Blue with Michael Benveniste (as Mike Lite) and Howard Ziehm. In 1971, Osco produced another adult film, Harlot, followed by the 1974 sci-fi spoof of Flash Gordon, Flesh Gordon, and the 1976 erotic musical comedy film, Alice in Wonderland. The film grossed over $90 million globally. Produced as a softcore film, Osco later re-edited it into a hardcore pornographic version, utilizing footage of Kristine de Bell not filmed during the original production. Jason Williams, who co-produced and acted in the film, criticised Osco's involvement in the film. He claims he was never paid for his involvement and that Osco overstated his involvement in the creative direction of the film.

Osco produced three films by writer/director Jackie Kong in the 1980s, starting with 1983's The Being, which also starred Osco in the lead role under the pseudonym Rexx Coltrane. This was followed by Kong's Night Patrol in 1984 and The Underachievers in 1987, both of which featured Osco in minor roles. Starting in 1987, Osco began his own directorial career with the comedy special The Unknown Comedy Show, a vehicle for stand-up comic Murray Langston, also known as The Unknown Comic.

In 2007, an Off-Broadway musical based on Osco's version of Alice in Wonderland was staged at the Kirk Theatre in New York City, to which Osco was credited with writing the book. Set in a trailer park in Weehawken, New Jersey, the show was entitled Alice in Wonderland: An Adult Musical Comedy and flyers advertising it were designated "For Mature Audiences Only."

He was also the owner of a pornography bookstore, Niks and Naks, in Garden City, Idaho, and of the Desert Skies Motel, also in Garden City. He bought his Malibu, California home in 1986.

== Style ==
The style of Osco's erotic movies has been described as awful in the sense that the dialogues are plain, the costumes of poor confection, and the sex scenes disturbingly uninspired. Vincent Canby describes Osco's style as "consistent vulgarity".
