= The World of Henry Paris =

- Directed by: Radley Metzger (as "Henry Paris")
- Produced by: Audubon Films
- Starring: Bobby Astyr; Barbara Bourbon; Eric Edwards; Jamie Gillis; Terri Hall; Annette Haven; C.J. Laing; Gloria Leonard; Sharon Mitchell; Darby Lloyd Rains; Georgina Spelvin; Mary Stuart
- Distributed by: VCA Pictures (USA)
- Release date: 1981
- Running time: minutes
- Country: USA
- Language: English

The World of Henry Paris is a 1981 American compilation film documentary of the 1970s erotic films directed by Radley Metzger, working under the alias name of "Henry Paris".

== Overview ==
The World of Henry Paris film presents highlights from the 1970s erotic films of "Henry Paris" (pseudonym of director Radley Metzger) which included Score (1974), The Private Afternoons of Pamela Mann (1974), Naked Came The Stranger (1975), The Image (1975), The Opening of Misty Beethoven (1976), Barbara Broadcast (1977), Marashino Cherry (1978) and The Tale of Tiffany Lust (1979). The "Henry Paris" films were released during the Golden Age of Porn (inaugurated by the 1969 release of Andy Warhol's Blue Movie) and the phenomenon of "porno chic" in the United States, in which adult erotic films were just beginning to be widely released, publicly discussed by celebrities (like Johnny Carson and Bob Hope) and taken seriously by film critics (like Roger Ebert).

According to one film reviewer, Metzger's films, including those made during the Golden Age of Porn (1969–1984), are noted for their "lavish design, witty screenplays, and a penchant for the unusual camera angle". Another reviewer noted that his films were "highly artistic — and often cerebral ... and often featured gorgeous cinematography". Film and audio works by Metzger have been added to the permanent collection of the Museum of Modern Art (MoMA) in New York City.

== Cast ==
- Bobby Astyr ... (archive footage)
- Barbara Bourbon ... (archive footage)
- Eric Edwards ... (archive footage)
- Jamie Gillis ... (archive footage)
- Terri Hall ... (archive footage)
- Annette Haven ... (archive footage)
- C.J. Laing ... (archive footage)
- Gloria Leonard ... (archive footage)
- Sharon Mitchell ... (archive footage)
- Darby Lloyd Rains ... (archive footage)
- Georgina Spelvin ... (archive footage)
- Mary Stuart ... (archive footage)

== See also ==
The following listing includes directors also known for artistic, adult-oriented films:

- Art film
- Erotic photography
- Fashion photography
- Glamour photography
- Golden Age of Porn

Related directors

- Andrew Blake
- Andy Warhol
- Gerard Damiano
- Michael Ninn
- Philip Mond
- Tinto Brass
