= List of American films of 1976 =

This is a list of American films released in 1976.

== Box office ==
The highest-grossing American films released in 1976, by domestic box office gross revenue as estimated by The Numbers, are as follows:

Highest-grossing films of 1976
Rank	Title	Distributor	Domestic gross
1	Rocky	United Artists	$117,235,147
2	To Fly!	IMAX Films	$86,600,000
3	A Star Is Born	Warner Bros.	$63,129,898
4	King Kong	Paramount	$52,614,445
5	Silver Streak	20th Century Fox	$51,079,064
6	All the President's Men	Warner Bros.	$51,048,435
7	The Omen	20th Century Fox	$48,570,885
8	The Enforcer	Warner Bros.	$46,200,000
9	Midway	Universal	$43,220,000
10	The Bad News Bears	Paramount	$42,349,782

== January–March ==
Opening		Title	Production company	Cast and crew	Ref.
J A N U A R Y	11	Jim the World's Greatest	Universal Pictures	Don Coscarelli (director/screenplay); Craig Mitchell (screenplay); Gregory Harrison, Reggie Bannister, Rory Guy, Marla Pennington, Robbie Wolcott, Karen McLain, David Lloyd	
J A N U A R Y	14	Killer Force	American International Pictures	Val Guest (director); Gerald Sanford, Michael Winder (screenplay); Telly Savalas, Peter Fonda, Hugh O'Brian, O. J. Simpson, Maud Adams, Christopher Lee, Ian Yule, Richard Loring, Clive Scott, Robert Drayton, Michael Mayer, Victor Melleney, Stuart Brown, Marina Christelis, Frank Shelley, Peter Van Dissel, Cocky Thlothlalemaje	
J A N U A R Y	18	Dr. Black, Mr. Hyde	Dimension Pictures Inc.	William Crain (director); Lawrence Woolner (screenplay); Bernie Casey, Rosalind Cash, Marie O'Henry, Ji-Tu Cumbuka, Milt Kogan, Stu Gilliam, Marc Alaimo, Elizabeth Robinson, Della Thomas	
J A N U A R Y	27	The Four Deuces	Embassy Pictures / AmeriEuro Pictures Corp	William H. Bushnell (director); C. Lester Franklin (screenplay); Jack Palance, Carol Lynley, Warren Berlinger, Adam Roarke, Gianni Russo, Hard Boiled Haggerty, Johnny Haymer, Martin Kove, Robert Deman, Carl Weathers, Lois Foraker, James Jeter, Robert Shayne, Cherie Latimer, E.J. Peaker, Damon Douglas, Ben Frommer, Mickey Morton, Jack O'Leary, Sierra Bandit, Isaac Goz, Lany Gustavson, David Jolliffe, Richard Molinare, Arnold Moreno, Rob Reece	
F E B R U A R Y	4	Next Stop, Greenwich Village	20th Century Fox	Paul Mazursky (director/screenplay); Lenny Baker, Shelley Winters, Ellen Greene, Lois Smith, Christopher Walken, Antonio Fargas, Mike Kellin, Lou Jacobi, Dori Brenner, Jeff Goldblum, Bill Murray, Joe Spinell, Stuart Pankin, Vincent Schiavelli, Rochelle Oliver, Rashel Novikoff, Michael Egan	
F E B R U A R Y	6	Echoes of a Summer	United Artists	Don Taylor (director); Robert L. Joseph (screenplay); Jodie Foster, Richard Harris, Lois Nettleton, Brad Savage, Geraldine Fitzgerald, William Windom	
F E B R U A R Y	9	Taxi Driver	Columbia Pictures / Bill/Phillips Productions / Italo-Judeo Productions	Martin Scorsese (director); Paul Schrader (screenplay); Robert De Niro, Jodie Foster, Albert Brooks, Harvey Keitel, Leonard Harris, Peter Boyle, Cybill Shepherd, Harry Northup, Victor Argo, Joe Spinell, Martin Scorsese, Steven Prince	
F E B R U A R Y	10	Hot Potato	Warner Bros.	Oscar Williams (director/screenplay); Jim Kelly, George Memmoli, Irene Tsu, Ron Prince, Yuen Biao, Geoffrey Binney, Judith Brown, Sam Hiona, Hardy Stockmann, Metta Rungrat, Supakorn Songssermvorakul, Somchai Meekunsut, Veerapol Pitavan, Puchong Makaraj	
F E B R U A R Y	11	Gable and Lombard	Universal Pictures	Sidney J. Furie (director); Barry Sandler (screenplay); James Brolin, Jill Clayburgh, Allen Garfield, Red Buttons, Joanne Linville, Melanie Mayron, Alice Backes, Ross Elliot, Morgan Brittany, Noah Keen, Alan Dexter, S. John Launer, William Bryant, Robert Karnes, Betsy Jones-Moreland, Aron Kincaid, Army Archerd, Frank Ashmore, Ivan Bonar, Bill Quinn	
F E B R U A R Y	11	No Deposit, No Return	Walt Disney Productions / Buena Vista Distribution	Norman Tokar (director); Arthur Alsberg, Don Nelson (screenplay); David Niven, Darren McGavin, Don Knotts, Herschel Bernardi, Charles Martin Smith, Barbara Feldon, Kim Richards, Brad Savage, John Williams, Vic Tayback, Robert Hastings, Louis Guss, Barney Phillips, James Hong, Stu Gilliam, Milt Kogan, Iris Adrian, Henry Slate, Richard O'Brien, Ruth Manning, Olive Dunbar	
F E B R U A R Y	13	Jack and the Beanstalk	Columbia Pictures / Group TAC / Nippon Herald Films	Gisaburō Sugii (director); Shūji Hirami (screenplay); Billie Lou Watt, Corinne Orr, Ray Owens, Jack Grimes	
F E B R U A R Y	15	Deadly Hero	AVCO Embassy Pictures / City Time Partners	Ivan Nagy (director); George Wislocki, Don Petersen (screenplay); Don Murray, Diahn Williams, James Earl Jones, Lilia Skala, Conchata Ferrell, George S. Irving, Ron Weyand, Treat Williams, Hank Garrett, Dick Anthony Williams, Josh Mostel, Rutanya Alda, Charles Siebert, Beverly Johnson, Chu Chu Malave, Danny DeVito, Deborah Harry	
F E B R U A R Y	15	The Killing of a Chinese Bookie	Faces Distribution	John Cassavetes (director/screenplay); Ben Gazzara, Timothy Carey, Seymour Cassel, Morgan Woodward, Azizi Johari, Robert Phillips, Meade Roberts, Haji, Val Avery, John Finnegan, James Lew, John Red Kullers, Al Ruban, Virginia Carrington, Alice Friedland, Donna Marie Gordon, Carol Warren, Derna Wong Davis, Kathalina Veniero, Soto Joe Hugh	
F E B R U A R Y	19	Grey Gardens	Portrait Films	David Maysles, Albert Maysles, Ellen Hovde, Muffie Meyer (directors); Edith "Big Edie" Bouvier Beale, Edith "Little Edie" Bouvier Beale, Norman Vincent Peale, Albert Maysles, David Maysles, Jerry Torre, Lois Wright, Brooks Hyers, Jack Helmuth	
F E B R U A R Y	27	Griffin and Phoenix	ABC Circle Films	Daryl Duke (director); John Hill (screenplay); Peter Falk, Jill Clayburgh, Sally Kirkland, George Chandler, John Harkins, Ken Sansom, John Lehne, Dorothy Tristan, Ben Hammer, Milton Parsons, Randy Faustino, Steven Rogers, Rod Haase	
M A R C H	3	The First Nudie Musical	Paramount Pictures	Mark Haggard (director); Bruce Kimmel (director/screenplay); Leslie Ackerman, Diana Canova, Bruce Kimmel, Cindy Williams, Frank Doubleday, Hy Pyke, Susan Buckner, Ron Howard, Alan Abelew, Stephen Nathan, Alexandra Morgan, Kathleen Hietata, Art Marino, Greg Finley, Herb Graham, Rene J. Hall, Susan Stewart, Jerry Hoffman, Wade Crookham, Eileen Ramsey, Claude Spence, Allison Cohen	
M A R C H	5	Black Shampoo	Dimension Pictures	Greydon Clark (director/screenplay); Alvin L. Fast (screenplay); John Daniels, Tanya Boyd, Skip E. Lowe, Joe Ortiz, Gary Allen, Anne Gaybis, William Bonner, Bruce Kerley	
M A R C H	11	Creature from Black Lake	Howco International Pictures / Cinema Shares International Distribution / Jim McCullough Productions	Joy N. Houck Jr. (director/screenplay); Jack Elam, Dub Taylor, Dennis Fimple, John David Carson, Bill Thurman, Roy Tatum	
M A R C H	11	Robin and Marian	Columbia Pictures / Rastar	Richard Lester (director); James Goldman (screenplay); Sean Connery, Audrey Hepburn, Robert Shaw, Nicol Williamson, Denholm Elliott, Ronnie Barker, Kenneth Haigh, Ian Holm, Richard Harris, Bill Maynard, Esmond Knight, Veronica Quilligan, Peter Butterworth, John Barrett, Kenneth Cranham, Victoria Abril	
M A R C H	12	I Will, I Will... for Now	20th Century Fox / Brut Productions	Norman Panama (director/screenplay); Albert E. Lewin (screenplay); Elliott Gould, Diane Keaton, Paul Sorvino, Victoria Principal, Robert Alda, Warren Berlinger, Madge Sinclair, Candy Clark, Carmen Zapata, George Tyne, Renata Vanni	
M A R C H	13	One Summer Love	American International Pictures	Gilbert Cates (director); N. Richard Nash (screenplay); Beau Bridges, Susan Sarandon, James Noble, Ann Wedgeworth, Linda Miller, Mildred Dunnock, Harriet Rogers, Martin Burke, Michael B. Miller	
M A R C H	17	Moving Violation	20th Century Fox / Santa Fe Productions	Charles S. Dubin (director); David R. Osterhout, William Norton (screenplay); Stephen McHattie, Kay Lenz, Eddie Albert, Lonny Chapman, Will Geer, Jack Murdock, John S. Ragin, Francis De Sales, Dick Miller, Paul Linke, Dennis Redfield, Michael Ross Verona	
M A R C H	18	The Man Who Fell to Earth	British Lion Films	Nicolas Roeg (director); Paul Mayersberg (screenplay); David Bowie, Rip Torn, Candy Clark, Buck Henry, Bernie Casey, Adrienne La Russa, Albert Nelson, Claudia Jennings, Jim Lovell, Jackson D. Kane, Rick Riccardo, Tony Mascia	
M A R C H	18	Mustang Country	Universal Pictures	John C. Champion (director/screenplay); Joel McCrea, Robert Fuller, Patrick Wayne, Nika Mina	
M A R C H	25	The Slipper and the Rose	Universal Pictures / David Paradine Productions	Bryan Forbes (director/screenplay); Robert B. Sherman, Richard M. Sherman (screenplay); Richard Chamberlain, Gemma Craven, Annette Crosbie, Edith Evans, Christopher Gable, Michael Hordern, Margaret Lockwood, Kenneth More, Lally Bowers, Julian Orchard, Rosalind Ayres, Sherrie Hewson, John Turner, Keith Skinner, Peter Graves, Polly Williams	
M A R C H	26	Bobbie Jo and the Outlaw	American International Pictures	Mark L. Lester (director); Vernon Zimmerman (screenplay); Lynda Carter, Marjoe Gortner, Jesse Vint, Gerrit Graham, Belinda Balaski, Peggy Stewart, Chuck Russell, Virgil Frye, James Gammon, Merrie Lynn Ross, Gene Drew, Richard Breeding, John Durren, Howard R. Kirk, Aly Yoder, Jesse Price, Jose Toledo	
M A R C H	26	Ride a Wild Pony	Walt Disney Productions / Buena Vista Distribution	Don Chaffey (director); Rosemary Anne Sisson (screenplay); Robert Bettles, Eva Griffith, Michael Craig, John Meillon, Alfred Bell, Roy Haddrick, Peter Gwynne, Melissa Jaffer, Lorraine Bayly, Wendy Playfair, Kate Clarkson, Jessica Noad, Neva Carr Glyn, Gerry Duggan	
M A R C H	26	Sky Riders	20th Century Fox	Douglas Hickox (director); Jack DeWitt, Stanley Mann, Garry Michael White (screenplay); James Coburn, Susannah York, Robert Culp, Charles Aznavour, Harry Andrews, John Beck, Zouzou, Kenneth Griffith, Werner Pochath, Barbara Trentham, Henry Brown, Anthony Antypas, Ernie F. Orsatti	
M A R C H	31	W.C. Fields and Me	Universal Pictures	Arthur Hiller (director); Bob Merrill (screenplay); Rod Steiger, Valerie Perrine, Jack Cassidy, John Marley, Bernadette Peters, Dana Elcar, Paul Stewart, Billy Barty, Allan Arbus, Milt Kamen, Louis Zorich, Andrew Parks, Linda Purl, Dennis Alwood, Selma Archerd, Donald Briggs, Frank De Vol, Eddie Firestone, Paul Mantee, Carlotta Monti, Kenneth Tobey	

== April–June ==
Opening		Title	Production company	Cast and crew	Ref.
A P R I L	1				
A P R I L	1	The Duchess and the Dirtwater Fox	20th Century Fox	Melvin Frank (director/screenplay); Barry Sandler, Jack Rose (screenplay); George Segal, Goldie Hawn, Conrad Janis, Thayer David, Jennifer Lee, Pat Ast, Dick Farnsworth, Roy Jenson, Sid Gould, E. J. André, Clifford Turknett, Bob Hoy, Bennie Dobbins, Walter Scott, Jerry Gatlin	
A P R I L	2	Lipstick	Paramount Pictures	Lamont Johnson (director); David Rayfiel (screenplay); Margaux Hemingway, Chris Sarandon, Mariel Hemingway, Anne Bancroft, Perry King, Robin Gammell, John Bennett Perry, Francesco Scavullo, Meg Wyllie, Inga Swenson, Catherine McLeod, Lauren Jones	
A P R I L	5	The Blue Bird	20th Century Fox / Lenfilm	George Cukor (director); Hugh Whitemore, Alfred Hayes, Aleksei Kapler (screenplay); Elizabeth Taylor, Jane Fonda, Cicely Tyson, Will Geer, Nadezhda Pavlova, Ava Gardner, Robert Morley, Leonid Nevedomsky, Harry Andrews, Todd Lookinland, Patsy Kensit, Mona Washbourne, George Cole, Richard Pearson, Georgiy Vitsin, Margarita Terekhova, Oleg Popov, Valentina Ganibalova, Eugene Shcherbakov, Grant Bardsley	
A P R I L	7	The Bad News Bears	Paramount Pictures	Michael Ritchie (director); Bill Lancaster (screenplay); Walter Matthau, Tatum O'Neal, Vic Morrow, Joyce Van Patten, Ben Piazza, Chris Barnes, Jackie Earle Haley, Alfred W. Lutter, Brett Marx, Brandon Cruz, Erin Blunt, Gary Lee Cavagnaro, Quinn Smith, David Stambaugh, Jaime Escobedo, George Gonzales, David Pollock, Scott Firestone	
A P R I L	7	Sparkle	Warner Bros. / RSO	Sam O'Steen (director); Joel Schumacher (screenplay); Irene Cara, Philip M. Thomas, Lonette McKee, Dwan Smith, Mary Alice, Dorian Harewood, Tony King, Beatrice Winde, Paul Lambert, Armelia McQueen, DeWayne Jessie, Norma Miller, Bob Delegall, Don Bexley, Ken Renard, Renn Woods, Joyce Easton, Talya Ferro	
A P R I L	9	All the President's Men	Warner Bros. / Wildwood Enterprises	Alan J. Pakula (director); William Goldman (screenplay); Robert Redford, Dustin Hoffman, Jack Warden, Martin Balsam, Hal Holbrook, Jason Robards, Jane Alexander, Stephen Collins, Ned Beatty, Meredith Baxter, Penny Fuller, Penny Peyser, Lindsay Crouse, Robert Walden, F. Murray Abraham, David Arkin, Richard Herd, Dominic Chianese, Ron Hale, Nicolas Coster, Joshua Shelley, Polly Holliday, James Karen, Basil Hoffman, John McMartin, Paul Lambert, Richard Venture, John Furlong, Valerie Curtin, Jess Osuna, Allyn Ann McLerie, Christopher Murray, Frank Wills, Cara Duff-MacCormick, John Randolph, Henry Calvert, Nate Esformes, Ralph Williams, Gene Lindsey, Carol Trost, Stanley Bennett Clay, John Devlin	
A P R I L	9	Family Plot	Universal Pictures	Alfred Hitchcock (director); Ernest Lehman (screenplay); Bruce Dern, Barbara Harris, William Devane, Karen Black, Cathleen Nesbitt, Ed Lauter, Katherine Helmond, Nicholas Colasanto, Edith Atwater, William Prince, Marge Redmond, Charles Tyner, Alexander Lockwood, Martin West, Elisabeth Brooks, Alan Fudge, Richard Hale, Louise Lorimer, Harriet E. MacGibbon, Fran Ryan, John Steadman, Vernon Weddle, Darrell Zwerling, Alfred Hitchcock	
A P R I L	11	Jackson County Jail	United Artists / New World Pictures	Michael Miller (director); Donald E. Stewart (screenplay); Yvette Mimieux, Tommy Lee Jones, Robert Carradine, Severn Darden, Howard Hesseman, John Lawlor, Britt Leach, Nan Martin, Mary Woronov, Cliff Emmich, Betty Thomas, Hal Needham, Donald E. Stewart	
A P R I L	11	The Sailor Who Fell from Grace with the Sea	AVCO Embassy Pictures / Haworth Productions by Martin-Poll Lewis John Carlino Production Sailor Company	Lewis John Carlino (director/screenplay); Sarah Miles, Kris Kristofferson, Earl Rhodes, Jonathan Kahn, Margo Cunningham, Paul Tropea	
A P R I L	14	The River Niger	Cine Artists Pictures / Continental Video / Reel Media International	Krishna Shah (director); Joseph A. Walker (screenplay); Cicely Tyson, James Earl Jones, Louis Gossett Jr., Glynn Turman, Jonelle Allen, Roger E. Mosley, Ralph Wilcox, Teddy Wilson, Charles Weldon, Zakes Mokae, Tony Burton	
A P R I L	23	Eat My Dust!	New World Pictures	Charles B. Griffith (director/screenplay); Ron Howard, Christopher Norris, Clint Howard, Charles Howerton, Rance Howard, Dave Madden, Robert Broyles, Paul Bartel, Corbin Bernsen, Don Brodie, Brad David, Kathy O'Dare, Peter Isacksen, Jessica Potter, Warren J. Kemmerling, Kedric Wolfe, John Kramer, W.L. Luckey	
A P R I L	23	Stay Hungry	United Artists	Bob Rafelson (director/screenplay); Charles Gaines (screenplay); Jeff Bridges, Sally Field, Arnold Schwarzenegger, R.G. Armstrong, Robert Englund, Helena Kallianiotes, Roger E. Mosley, Woodrow Parfrey, Scatman Crothers, Kathleen Miller, Fannie Flagg	
A P R I L	25	Hollywood Boulevard	New World Pictures	Allan Arkush, Joe Dante (directors); Danny Opatoshu (screenplay); Candice Rialson, Mary Woronov, Rita George, Jeffrey Kramer, Dick Miller, Richard Doran, Tara Strohmeier, Paul Bartel, John Kramer, Jonathan Kaplan, Commander Cody and His Lost Planet Airmen	
M A Y	5	Baby Blue Marine	Columbia Pictures / Spelling-Goldberg Productions	John D. Hancock (director); Stanford Whitmore (screenplay); Jan-Michael Vincent, Glynnis O'Connor, Katherine Helmond, Dana Elcar, Bert Remsen, Bruno Kirby, Richard Gere, Art Lund, Michael Conrad, Allan Miller, Will Seltzer, Kenneth Tobey, Lelia Goldoni	
M A Y	16	Escape from the Dark	Walt Disney Productions / Buena Vista Distribution	Charles Jarrott (director); Rosemary Anne Sisson (screenplay); Alastair Sim, Peter Barkworth, Maurice Colbourne, Susan Tebbs, Andrew Harrison, Chloe Franks, Benjie Bolgar, Prunella Scales, Leslie Sands, Joe Gladwin, Jeremy Bulloch, Rich Moore	
M A Y	16	Grizzly	Film Ventures International / Columbia Pictures	William Girdler (director); David Sheldon (director/screenplay); Harvey Flaxman (screenplay); Christopher George, Andrew Prine, Richard Jaeckel, Joan McCall, Mike Clifford, Joe Dorsey, Charles Kissinger	
M A Y	16	That's Entertainment, Part II	United Artists	Gene Kelly (director); Leonard Gershe (screenplay); Fred Astaire, Gene Kelly, Abbott & Costello, Eddie 'Rochester' Anderson, Louis Armstrong, Lew Ayres, John Barrymore, Lionel Barrymore, Wallace Beery, Robert Benchley, Constance Bennett, Jack Benny, Jack Buchanan	
M A Y	19	The Missouri Breaks	United Artists	Arthur Penn (director); Thomas McGuane (screenplay); Marlon Brando, Jack Nicholson, Randy Quaid, Kathleen Lloyd, Frederic Forrest, Harry Dean Stanton, John McLiam, John Ryan, Sam Gilman, Steve Franken, Richard Bradford, James Greene, Luana Anders, Danny Goldman, Hunter von Leer, Virgil Frye, Charles Wagenheim, R.L. Armstrong, Dan Ades, Dorothy Neumann, Vern Chandler	
M A Y	19	The Premonition	AVCO Embassy Pictures / Movicorp Media	Robert Schnitzer (director/screenplay); Anthony Mahon (screenplay); Sharon Farrell, Danielle Brisebois, Richard Lynch, Jeff Corey, Robert Harper, Edward Bell, Ellen Barber, Chitra Neogy, Margaret Graham, Rosemary McNamara, Thomas Williams, Roy White	
M A Y	21	1900	Paramount Pictures	Bernardo Bertolucci (director/screenplay); Franco Arcalli, Giuseppe Bertolucci (screenplay); Robert De Niro, Gérard Depardieu, Dominique Sanda, Francesca Bertini, Laura Betti, Stefania Casini, Sterling Hayden, Ellen Schwiers, Alida Valli, Romolo Valli, Stefania Sandrelli, Donald Sutherland	
M A Y	21	Embryo	Cine Artists Pictures / Plura Service Company / Sandy Howard Productions	Ralph Nelson (director); Anita Doohan, Jack W. Thomas (screenplay); Rock Hudson, Barbara Carrera, Diane Ladd, Roddy McDowall, Anne Schedeen, Vincent Baggetta, Jack Colvin, Dick Winslow, Dr. Joyce Brothers, Ken Washington, Lina Raymond	
M A Y	21	Hawmps!	Mulberry Square Releasing	Joe Camp (director/screenplay); William Bickley, Michael Warren (screenplay); James Hampton, Christopher Connelly, Slim Pickens, Denver Pyle, Mimi Maynard, Jack Elam, Lee de Broux, Herb Vigran, Jesse Davis, Frank Inn, Don Starr, Alvin Wright, Gene Conforti, Dick Drake, Larry Swartz, Mike Travis, Tiny Wells, Dick Drake, Henry Kendrick, Catherine Hearne, Larry Strawbridge, Sheba	
M A Y	26	Drive-In	Columbia Pictures / George Litto Productions	Rod Amateau (director); Bob Peete (screenplay); Lisa Lemole, Glenn Morshower, Trey Wilson, Ashley Cox, Bill McGhee, Gary Lee Cavagnaro, Billy Milliken, Lee Newsom, Regan Kee, Andy Parks, Gordon Hurst, Kent Perkins, Barry Gremillion, Gloria Shaw, Jessie Lee Fulton, Robert Valgova, Michelle Franks, Hank Stohl	
M A Y	26	Mother, Jugs & Speed	20th Century Fox	Peter Yates (director); Tom Mankiewicz (screenplay); Bill Cosby, Raquel Welch, Harvey Keitel, Allen Garfield, Larry Hagman, Michael McManus, Allan Warnick, Bruce Davison, Dick Butkus, L.Q. Jones, Ric Carrott, Severn Darden, Bill Henderson, Valerie Curtin, Milt Kamen, Barra Grant, Toni Basil, Read Morgan, Tim Reid, Queenie Smith, Vivian St. John, Mark L. Taylor	
M A Y	26	Won Ton Ton, the Dog Who Saved Hollywood	Paramount Pictures	Michael Winner (director); Arnold Schulman, Cy Howard (screenplay); Bruce Dern, Madeline Kahn, Art Carney, Phil Silvers, Ron Leibman, Teri Garr, Ronny Graham, Toni Basil, Dorothy Lamour, Joan Blondell, Virginia Mayo, Henny Youngman, Rory Calhoun, Aldo Ray, Ethel Merman, Nancy Walker, Rhonda Fleming, Dean Stockwell, Dick Haymes, Tab Hunter, Robert Alda, Victor Mature, Edgar Bergen	
M A Y	28	Leadbelly	Paramount Pictures	Gordon Parks (director); Ernest Kinoy (screenplay); Roger E. Mosley, Paul Benjamin, Madge Sinclair, Albert Hall, Art Evans, John Henry Faulk, Vivian Bonnell, Lynn Hamilton, William Wintersole, James Brodhead, Dana Manno	
M A Y	28	The Little Girl Who Lives Down the Lane (Cannes Film Festival)	Astral Films / Cinema International Corporation / American International Pictures / Claremont Productions / Zev Braun Productions / I.C.L. Industries / La Societe Filmel / Ypsilon Films	Nicolas Gessner (director); Laird Koenig (screenplay); Jodie Foster, Martin Sheen, Alexis Smith, Mort Shuman, Scott Jacoby, Connie Foster	
M A Y	28	Shoot	AVCO Embassy Pictures / Essex Enterprises / Getty Pictures Corporation	Harvey Hart (director); Dick Berg (screenplay); Cliff Robertson, Ernest Borgnine, Henry Silva, James Blendick, Leslie Carlson, Kate Reid, Helen Shaver, Larry Reynolds, Gloria Carlin, Alan McRae, Ed McNamara, Peter Langley, Helena Hart, Allan Aarons, Sydney Brown	
J U N E	1	A Clockwork Orange (re-release)	Warner Bros. / Polaris Productions / Hawk Films	Stanley Kubrick (director/screenplay); Malcolm McDowell, Patrick Magee, Michael Bates, Warren Clarke, John Clive, Adrienne Corri, Carl Duering, Paul Farrell	
J U N E	1	The Last Hard Men	20th Century Fox	Andrew V. McLaglen (director); Guerdon Trueblood (screenplay); Charlton Heston, James Coburn, Barbara Hershey, Jorge Rivero, Michael Parks, Larry Wilcox, Thalmus Rasulala, Morgan Paull, John Quade, Robert Donner, Christopher Mitchum, Riley Hill	
J U N E	2	Breaking Point	20th Century Fox	Bob Clark (director); Stanley Mann, Roger Swaybill (screenplay); Bo Svenson, Robert Culp, John Colicos, Belinda Montgomery, Linda Sorenson, Stephen Young	
J U N E	2	A Small Town in Texas	American International Pictures	Jack Starrett (director); William Norton (screenplay); Bo Hopkins, Susan George, Timothy Bottoms, John Karlen, Morgan Woodward, Art Hindle, Clay Tanner, Randee Lynne Jensen, Hank Rolike, George Buck Flower	
J U N E	4	Ode to Billy Joe	Warner Bros.	Max Baer Jr. (director); Herman Raucher (screenplay); Robby Benson, Glynnis O'Connor, Joan Hotchkis, Sandy McPeak, James Best, Terence Goodman, Becky Bowen, Simpson Hemphill, Ed Shelnut, Eddie Talr, William Hallberg, Rebecca Jernigan	
J U N E	11	The Cars That Ate Paris	British Empire Films / Australian Film Development Corporation / Royce Smeal Film Productions / Salt Pan Films	Peter Weir (director/screenplay); John Meillon, Terry Camilleri, Chris Haywood, Bruce Spence, Max Gillies, Edward Howell, Max Phipps, Melissa Jaffer, Kevin Miles, Rick Scully, Peter Armstrong, Joe Burrow, Deryck Barnes, Jack Ellerton	
J U N E	11	The Tenant	Paramount Pictures / Marianne Productions	Roman Polanski (director/screenplay); Gérard Brach (screenplay); Roman Polanski, Isabelle Adjani, Melvyn Douglas, Jo Van Fleet, Bernard Fresson, Rufus, Shelley Winters, Lila Kedrova, Josiane Balasko, Claude Dauphin, Claude Piéplu, Jacques Monod, Michel Blanc, Eva Ionesco, Albert Delpy, Patrice Alexsandre, Romain Bouteille, Jacques Rosny	
J U N E	17	Harry and Walter Go to New York	Columbia Pictures	Mark Rydell (director); John Byrum, Robert Kaufman, Don Devlin (screenplay); James Caan, Michael Caine, Elliott Gould, Diane Keaton, Charles Durning, Lesley Ann Warren, Burt Young, Kathryn Grody, Brion James, Jack Gilford, Val Avery, Dennis Dugan, Carol Kane	
J U N E	17	Silent Movie	20th Century Fox / Crossbow Productions	Mel Brooks (director/screenplay); Ron Clark, Rudy De Luca, Barry Levinson (screenplay); Mel Brooks, Marty Feldman, Dom DeLuise, Sid Caesar, Harold Gould, Ron Carey, Bernadette Peters, Burt Reynolds, James Caan, Liza Minnelli	
J U N E	18	The Food of the Gods	American International Pictures	Bert I. Gordon (director/screenplay); Marjoe Gortner, Pamela Franklin, Ralph Meeker, Jon Cypher, Ida Lupino, Belinda Balaski, Tom Stovall, John McLiam, Chuck Courtney	
J U N E	18	Midway	Universal Pictures / The Mirisch Corporation	Jack Smight (director); Donald S. Sanford (screenplay); Charlton Heston, Henry Fonda, James Coburn, Glenn Ford, Hal Holbrook, Toshiro Mifune, Robert Mitchum, Cliff Robertson, Robert Wagner, Robert Webber, Ed Nelson, James Shigeta, Christina Kokubo, Edward Albert	
J U N E	20	Once Upon a Girl	Severin Films / Concelation a Girl, Inc. / Tommy J Productions	Don Jurwich (director/screenplay); Hal Smith, Frank Welker, Richmond Johnson, Carol Piacente, Kelly Gordon	
J U N E	23	The Big Bus	Paramount Pictures	James Frawley (director); Lawrence J. Cohen, Fred Freeman (screenplay); Joseph Bologna, Stockard Channing, John Beck, Ned Beatty, José Ferrer, Ruth Gordon, Harold Gould, Larry Hagman, Sally Kellerman, Richard Mulligan, Lynn Redgrave, René Auberjonois, Bob Dishy, Richard B. Shull, Stuart Margolin, Howard Hesseman, Mary Wilcox, Walter Brooke, Vic Tayback, Murphy Dunne, Vito Scotti	
J U N E	23	The Great Scout & Cathouse Thursday	American International Pictures	Don Taylor (director); Richard Shapiro (screenplay); Lee Marvin, Oliver Reed, Robert Culp, Elizabeth Ashley, Strother Martin, Sylvia Miles, Kay Lenz	
J U N E	23	Logan's Run	Metro-Goldwyn-Mayer	Michael Anderson (director); David Zelag Goodman (screenplay); Michael York, Jenny Agutter, Richard Jordan, Roscoe Lee Browne, Farrah Fawcett-Majors, Peter Ustinov, Michael Anderson Jr., Randolph Roberts, Gary Morgan, Ashley Cox, Lara Lindsay	
J U N E	23	Murder by Death	Columbia Pictures / Rastar	Robert Moore (director); Neil Simon (screenplay); Eileen Brennan, Truman Capote, James Coco, Peter Falk, Alec Guinness, Elsa Lanchester, David Niven, Peter Sellers, Maggie Smith, Nancy Walker, Estelle Winwood, James Cromwell, Richard Narita, Fay Wray	
J U N E	24	Buffalo Bill and the Indians, or Sitting Bull's History Lesson	United Artists	Robert Altman (director/screenplay); Alan Rudolph (screenplay); Paul Newman, Burt Lancaster, Geraldine Chaplin, Kevin McCarthy, Joel Grey, Harvey Keitel, John Considine, Will Sampson, Pat McCormick, Shelley Duvall, Allan F. Nicholls, Robert DoQui, Evelyn Lear, Bert Remsen, Denver Pyle, Jerri Duce, Patrick Reynolds, Frank Kaquitts, Mike Kaplan, Bonnie Leaders, Noelle Rogers, Ken Krossa, Fred N. Larsen	
J U N E	25	The Omen	20th Century Fox / Mace Neufeld Productions	Richard Donner (director); David Seltzer (screenplay); Gregory Peck, Lee Remick, David Warner, Billie Whitelaw, Harvey Stephens, Patrick Troughton, Martin Benson, Leo McKern, Robert Rietti, John Stride, Anthony Nicholls, Holly Palance, Roy Boyd, Freda Dowie, Sheila Raynor, Robert MacLeod, Bruce Boa, Don Fellows, Patrick McAlinney, Betty McDowall, Nicholas Campbell, Tommy Duggan	
J U N E	28	Sweet Revenge	United Artists	Jerry Schatzberg (director); Marilyn Goldin, B.J. Perla, Jor Van Kline (screenplay); Stockard Channing, Sam Waterston, Franklyn Ajaye, Jan D'Arcy, Evan Lottman, Richard Daughty, Norman Matlock, Edmund Villa, Adele Burnett	
J U N E	30	The Outlaw Josey Wales	Warner Bros. / The Malpaso Company	Clint Eastwood (director); Phil Kaufman, Sonia Chernus (screenplay); Clint Eastwood, Chief Dan George, Sondra Locke, Bill McKinney, John Vernon, Paula Trueman, Sam Bottoms, Geraldine Keams, Woodrow Parfrey, Joyce Jameson, Sheb Wooley, Royal Dano, Matt Clark, Will Sampson, William O'Connell, John Quade, Buck Kartalian, Len Lesser, Doug McGrath, John Russell, Charles Tyner, Bruce M. Fischer, John Mitchum, John Chandler, Clay Tanner, Bob Hoy, John Verros, Frank Schofield, Tom Roy Lowe	

== July–September ==
Opening		Title	Production company	Cast and crew	Ref.
J U L Y	1	To Fly!	Conoco Inc. / MacGillivray Freeman Films / Francis Thompson, Inc.	Greg MacGillivray (director/screenplay); Jim Freeman, Thomas McGrath, Francis Thompson, Robert M. Young, Arthur Zegart (screenplay)	
J U L Y	1	Treasure of Matecumbe	Walt Disney Productions / Buena Vista Distribution	Vincent McEveety (director); Don Tait (screenplay); Robert Foxworth, Joan Hackett, Peter Ustinov, Vic Morrow, Johnny Doran, Billy Attmore, Jane Wyatt, Virginia Vincent, Robert DoQui, Mills Watson, Don Knight, Dub Taylor, Dick Van Patten, George Lindsey, John Myhers, Logan Ramsey, Valentin de Vargas, Jonathan Daly, John Steadman, Rex Holman, Clint Ritchie, Ken Renard, Brion James, John Hayes, David S. Cass Sr., Warde Donovan, James Brodhead, John C. Flinn III, Louie Elias, Richard Wright	
J U L Y	6	Cannonball	New World Pictures	Paul Bartel (director/screenplay); Donald C. Simpson (screenplay); David Carradine, Bill McKinney, Veronica Hamel, Belinda Balaski, Archie Hahn, Gerrit Graham, Robert Carradine, Mary Woronov, James Keach, Dick Miller, Paul Bartel	
J U L Y	7	Gus	Walt Disney Productions / Buena Vista Distribution	Vincent McEveety (director); Arthur Alsberg, Don Nelson (screenplay); Edward Asner, Don Knotts, Gary Grimes, Tim Conway, Liberty Williams, Dick Van Patten, Harold Gould, Ronnie Schell	
J U L Y	9	Mad Dog Morgan	British Empire Films / Motion Picture Productions	Philippe Mora (director/screenplay); Dennis Hopper, Jack Thompson, David Gulpilil, Frank Thring, Michael Pate, Wallas Eaton, Bill Hunter, John Hargreaves, Robin Ramsay	
J U L Y	9	The Opening of Misty Beethoven	Catalyst Productions / Joy Bear Pictures / VCA Pictures	Radley Metzger (director/screenplay); Constance Money, Jamie Gillis, Jacqueline Beudant, Gloria Leonard, Terri Hall, Calvin Culver, Mark Margolis	
J U L Y	14	Shadow of the Hawk	Columbia Pictures	George McCowan (director); Norman Thaddeus Vane, Herbert Wright (screenplay); Jan-Michael Vincent, Marilyn Hassett, Chief Dan George, Pia Shandel, Marianne Jones, Jacques Hubert	
J U L Y	15	At the Earth's Core	American International Pictures / Amicus Productions	Kevin Connor (director); Milton Subotsky (screenplay); Doug McClure, Peter Cushing, Caroline Munro, Cy Grant, Godfrey James, Keith Barron, Robert Gillespie, Sean Lynch, Helen Gill, Anthony Verner, Michael Crane, Bobby Parr, Andee Cromarty	
J U L Y	16	The Bingo Long Traveling All-Stars & Motor Kings	Universal Pictures / Motown Productions	John Badham (director); Hal Barwood, Matthew Robbins (screenplay); Billy Dee Williams, James Earl Jones, Richard Pryor, Stan Shaw, Tony Burton, Jophery Brown, Leon Wagner, John McCurry, DeWayne Jessie, Ted Ross, Mabel King, Ken Foree, Carl Gordon, Rico Dawson, Sam "Birmingham" Brison	
J U L Y	23	Lifeguard	Paramount Pictures	Daniel Petrie (director); Ron Koslow (screenplay); Sam Elliott, Anne Archer, Stephen Young, Parker Stevenson, Kathleen Quinlan, Sharon Weber, Steve Burns	
J U L Y	23	Special Delivery	American International Pictures	Paul Wendkos (director); John Melson, James Edward Grant, Gilbert Ralston, Don Gazzaniga (screenplay); Bo Svenson, Cybill Shepherd, Tom Atkins, Sorrell Booke, Gerrit Graham, Michael C. Gwynne	
J U L Y	23	A*P*E	Worldwide Entertainment / Kukje Movies / Lee Ming Film Co.	Paul Leder (director/screenplay); Richard Leder (screenplay); Rod Arrants, Joanna Kerns, Alex Nicol, Lee Nak-hoon, Paul Leder, Jules Levey, Yeon-jeong Woo, Jerry Harke	
J U L Y	28	Futureworld	American International Pictures / The Aubrey Company	Richard T. Heffron (director); Mayo Simon, George Schenck (screenplay); Peter Fonda, Blythe Danner, Arthur Hill, Stuart Margolin, John Ryan, Yul Brynner, James M. Connor, Allen Ludden, Robert Cornthwaite, Angela Greene, Darrell Larson, Nancy Bell, Bert Conroy, Dorothy Konrad, Jim Antonio	
J U L Y	29	Oz	Greater Union	Chris Löfvén (director/screenplay); Joy Dunstan, Graham Matters, Bruce Spence, Gary Waddell, Robin Ramsay, Michael Carman	
J U L Y	29	Swashbuckler	Universal Pictures	James Goldstone (director); Paul Wheeler (screenplay); Robert Shaw, James Earl Jones, Peter Boyle, Geneviève Bujold, Beau Bridges, Geoffrey Holder, Avery Schreiber, Tom Clancy, Anjelica Huston, Mark Baker, Kip Niven, Louisa Horton, Bernard Behrens, Dorothy Tristan, Tom Fitzsimmons	
J U L Y	30	Drum	United Artists / Dino De Laurentiis Company	Steve Carver (director); Norman Wexler (screenplay); Warren Oates, Isela Vega, Ken Norton, Pam Grier, Yaphet Kotto, John Colicos, Fiona Lewis, Paula Kelly, Brenda Sykes, Royal Dano, Lillian Hayman, Rainbeaux Smith, Clay Tanner, Lila Finn	
J U L Y	30	Squirm	American International Pictures / The Squirm Company	Jeff Lieberman (director/screenplay); Don Scardino, Patricia Pearcy, Jean Sullivan, William Newman, R.A. Dow, Peter MacLean, Fran Higgins, Barbara Quinn, Carl Dagenhart, Angel Sande, Carol Jean Owens, Kim Leon Iocovozzi, Walter Dimmick, Leslie Thorsen, Julia Klopp	
J U L Y	31	St. Ives	Warner Bros.	J. Lee Thompson (director); Barry Beckerman (screenplay); Charles Bronson, John Houseman, Jacqueline Bisset, Maximilian Schell, Harris Yulin, Dana Elcar, Harry Guardino, Joseph Roman, Jerome Thor, George Sawaya	
A U G U S T	1	Obsession	Columbia Pictures / Yellowbird Productions	Brian De Palma (director); Paul Schrader (screenplay); Cliff Robertson, Geneviève Bujold, John Lithgow	
A U G U S T	1	The Wackiest Wagon Train in the West	Danton Films	Jack Arnold, Earl Bellamy, Bruce Bilson, Oscar Rudolph (directors); Ron Friedman, Howard Ostroff, Brad Radnitz, Sherwood Schwartz, Elroy Schwartz (screenplay); Bob Denver, Forrest Tucker, Ivor Francis, Jeannine Riley, Lori Saunders, William Cort, Eddie Little Sky, Don 'Red' Barry, Buck Young, James Gammon, Dennis Fimple, John Quade, Dick Peabody, James Jeter, Ernesto Esparza III, Taylor Lacher	
A U G U S T	4	The Return of a Man Called Horse	United Artists / Estudios Churubusco Azteca / Sandy Howard Productions	Irvin Kershner (director); Jack DeWitt (screenplay); Richard Harris, Gale Sondergaard, Geoffrey Lewis, William Lucking, Claudio Brook, Enrique Lucero, Pedro Damián, Jorge Luke, Jorge Russek, Regino Herrera, Humberto López, Alberto Mariscal, Eugenia Dolores, Patricia Reyes Spíndola, Ana De Sade	
A U G U S T	8	From Noon till Three	United Artists	Frank D. Gilroy (director/screenplay); Charles Bronson, Jill Ireland, Douglas Fowley, Anne Ramsey	
A U G U S T	12	The Devil's Playground	Umbrella Entertainment / The Film House	Fred Schepisi (director/screenplay); Arthur Dignam, Nick Tate, Simon Burke, Charles McCallum, John Frawley, Jonathan Hardy, Gerry Duggan, Peter Cox, Thomas Keneally, Sheila Florance, John Diedrich, Alan Cinis, Richard Morgan, Jeremy Kewley	
A U G U S T	12	The Ritz	Warner Bros.	Richard Lester (director); Terrence McNally (screenplay); Jack Weston, Rita Moreno, Jerry Stiller, Kaye Ballard, F. Murray Abraham, Treat Williams, Dave King, Bessie Love, Paul B. Price, John Everson, Christopher J. Brown	
A U G U S T	18	The Great Texas Dynamite Chase	New World Pictures / Yasny Talking Pictures II	Michael Pressman (director); David Kirkpatrick (screenplay); Claudia Jennings, Tara Strohmeier, Oliver Clark, Tom Rosqui, Danny Sullivan, Bart Braverman, Jim Boles, Christopher Pennock, Priscilla Pointer, Johnny Crawford, Jocelyn Jones, Miles Watkins, Nancy Bleier, Buddy Kling, Ed Steef, Peggy Brenner	
A U G U S T	20	The Gumball Rally	Warner Bros. / First Artists	Charles Bail (director); Leon Capetanos (screenplay); Michael Sarrazin, Norman Burton, Gary Busey, John Durren, Susan Flannery, Steven Keats, Tim McIntire, Joanne Nail, J. Pat O'Malley, Nicholas Pryor, Raúl Juliá, Vaughn Taylor, Tricia O'Neil, Harvey Jason, John Morton, Linda Vaughn, John Lawlor, Lazaro Perez, Wally Taylor, Eddy Donno, Dick Karie, Alfred Shelly, Whitey Hughes, Larry Silvestri, Wes Dawn, Stephen Blood	
A U G U S T	20	The Shootist	Paramount Pictures	Don Siegel (director); Miles Hood Swarthout, Scott Hale (screenplay); John Wayne, Lauren Bacall, Ron Howard, James Stewart, Richard Boone, John Carradine, Scatman Crothers, Richard Lenz, Harry Morgan, Sheree North, Hugh O'Brian, Bill McKinney, Gregg Palmer, Alfred Dennis, Dick Winslow, Melody Thomas Scott, Kathleen O'Malley, Charles G. Martin	
A U G U S T	25	Gator	United Artists / Levy-Gardner-Laven	Burt Reynolds (director); William W. Norton (screenplay); Burt Reynolds, Jack Weston, Lauren Hutton, Jerry Reed, Alice Ghostley, Dub Taylor, Mike Douglas, Burton Gilliam, William Engesser, John Steadman, Alex Hawkins, Don Ferguson, Watson B. Duncan III, Lori Futch, Dudley Remus	
A U G U S T	25	J.D.'s Revenge	American International Pictures	Arthur Marks (director); Jaison Starkes (screenplay); Glynn Turman, Louis Gossett Jr., Joan Pringle, James Watkins, Earl Billings, Carl W. Crudup, Fred Pinkard, Jo Anne Meredith, Alice Jubert, David McKnight, Stephanie Faulkner, Fuddie Bagley, Paul Galloway	
S E P T E M B E R	1	High Velocity	Turtle Releasing / First Asian Films of California	Remi Kramer (director/screenplay); Michael Parsons (screenplay); Ben Gazzara, Britt Ekland, Paul Winfield, Keenan Wynn, Alejandro Rey, Joonee Gamboa, Liam Dunn, Richard O'Brien, Stacy Keach Sr., Victoria Racimo, Rita Gomez, Joe Andrade, James Bacon, Jojo Juan	
S E P T E M B E R	9	Vigilante Force	United Artists	George Armitage (director/screenplay); Kris Kristofferson, Jan-Michael Vincent, Victoria Principal, Bernadette Peters, Brad Dexter, Judson Pratt, David Doyle, Antony Carbone, Andrew Stevens	
S E P T E M B E R	15	In the Realm of the Senses	Surrogate / Argos Films / Oceanic / Oshima Productions / Toho-Towa	Nagisa Ōshima (director/screenplay); Eiko Matsuda, Tatsuya Fuji, Taiji Tonoyama, Aoi Nakajima, Yasuko Matsui, Meika Seri, Kanae Kobayashi, Kyôji Kokonoe, Naomi Shiraishi, Komikichi Hori	
S E P T E M B E R	15	Bugsy Malone	Paramount Pictures	Alan Parker (director/screenplay); Jodie Foster, Scott Baio, John Cassisi, Andrew Paul, Jeffrey Stevens, Dexter Fletcher, Bonnie Langford, Mark Curry, Jonathan Scott-Taylor, Louise English, Florrie Dugger, Martin Lev, Paul Murphy, Sheridan Earl Russell, Albin 'Humpty' Jenkins, Paul Chirelstein, Donald Waugh, Peter Holder, Michael Kirkby, Davidson Knight, John Williams, Sarah E. Joyce, Helen Corran, Kathy Spaulding, Sharon Noonan, Vivienne McKone, Lynn Aulbaugh, Michael Jackson	
S E P T E M B E R	17	The Front	Columbia Pictures	Martin Ritt (director); Walter Bernstein (screenplay); Woody Allen, Zero Mostel, Michael Murphy, Herschel Bernardi, Andrea Marcovicci, Remak Ramsay, Lloyd Gough, David Margulies, Joshua Shelley, Norman Rose, Charles Kimbrough, Josef Sommer, Danny Aiello	
S E P T E M B E R	22	Mad Dog Morgan	British Empire Films / Motion Picture Productions	Philippe Mora (director/screenplay); Dennis Hopper, Jack Thompson, David Gulpilil, Frank Thring, Michael Pate, Wallas Eaton, Bill Hunter, John Hargreaves, Robin Ramsay	
S E P T E M B E R	29	Norman... Is That You?	United Artists / Metro-Goldwyn-Mayer	George Schlatter (director/screenplay); Ron Clark, Sam Bobrick (screenplay); Redd Foxx, Pearl Bailey, Dennis Dugan, Michael Warren, Tamara Dobson, Vernee Watson, Jayne Meadows, George Furth, Barbara Sharma, Sergio Aragonés, Wayland Flowers	

== October–December ==
Opening		Title	Production company	Cast and crew	Ref.
O C T O B E R	3	Alex & the Gypsy	20th Century Fox	John Korty (director); Lawrence B. Marcus (screenplay); Jack Lemmon, Geneviève Bujold, James Woods, Robert Emhardt, Titos Vandis, William Cort, Frank Doubleday, Robert Miano, Al Checco, Harold Sylvester, Clyde Kusatsu, Eddra Gale, Gino Ardito, Todd Martin, Joseph X. Flaherty, Alan DeWitt, Victor Pinheiro	
O C T O B E R	7	A Matter of Time	Variety Distribution	Vincente Minnelli (director); John Gay (screenplay); Liza Minnelli, Ingrid Bergman, Charles Boyer, Isabella Rossellini, Tina Aumont, Fernando Rey, Spiros Andros, Gabriele Ferzetti, Orso Maria Guerrini, Amedeo Nazzari, Giampiero Albertini, Arnoldo Foà, Anna Proclemer	
O C T O B E R	8	Fighting Mad	20th Century Fox / Santa Fe Productions	Jonathan Demme (director/screenplay); Peter Fonda, Lynn Lowry, John Doucette, Philip Carey, Harry Northup, Noble Willingham, Kathleen Miller, Scott Glenn, Ted Markland	
O C T O B E R	8	Marathon Man	Paramount Pictures / Robert Evans-Sidney Beckerman Productions	John Schlesinger (director); William Goldman (screenplay); Dustin Hoffman, Laurence Olivier, Roy Scheider, William Devane, Marthe Keller, Fritz Weaver, Richard Bright, Marc Lawrence, Tito Goya, Jacques Marin, Allen Joseph, Ben Dova, Lou Gilbert	
O C T O B E R	8	Scorchy	American International Pictures / Hickmar Productions	Howard Avedis (director/screenplay); Connie Stevens, Cesare Danova, William Smith, Norman Burton, John Davis Chandler, Joyce Jameson, Greg Evigan, Nick Dimitri, Marlene Schmidt, Nate Long, Ingrid Cedergren, Ellen Thurston, Ray Sebastian, Mike Esky, Gene White	
O C T O B E R	15	Harlan County, USA	Cinema 5 / Cabin Creek Films	Barbara Kopple (director)	
O C T O B E R	18	Burnt Offerings	United Artists / Produzioni Europee Associati (PEA) / Dan Curtis Productions	Dan Curtis (director/screenplay); William F. Nolan (screenplay); Karen Black, Oliver Reed, Burgess Meredith, Eileen Heckart, Lee H. Montgomery, Dub Taylor, Bette Davis, Anthony James, Todd Tarquand	
O C T O B E R	18	The Killer Inside Me	Warner Bros.	Burt Kennedy (director); Edward Mann, Robert Chamblee (screenplay); Stacy Keach, Susan Tyrrell, Tisha Sterling, Keenan Wynn, Don Stroud, Charles McGraw, John Dehner, Pepe Serna, John Carradine, Royal Dano, Julie Adams	
O C T O B E R	20	Diary of the Dead	B.S. Moss Enterprises	Arvin Brown (director); I.C. Rapoport, Robert L. Fish, Ruth Rendell (screenplay); Geraldine Fitzgerald, Héctor Elizondo, Salome Jens, Joseph Maher, Austin Pendleton, Kate Wilkinson	
O C T O B E R	20	The Song Remains the Same	Warner Bros.	Peter Clifton, Joe Massot (directors); Led Zeppelin	
O C T O B E R	22	Car Wash	Universal Pictures	Michael Schultz (director); Joel Schumacher (screenplay); Franklin Ajaye, Bill Duke, George Carlin, Irwin Corey, Ivan Dixon, Antonio Fargas, Jack Kehoe, Clarence Muse, Lorraine Gary, The Pointer Sisters, Richard Pryor, Garrett Morris, Sully Boyar, Carmine Caridi	
O C T O B E R	22	God Told Me To	New World Pictures	Larry Cohen (director/screenplay); Tony Lo Bianco, Deborah Raffin, Sandy Dennis, Sylvia Sidney, Sam Levene, Robert Drivas, Mike Kellin, Richard Lynch, Sammy Williams, Harry Bellaver, Andy Kaufman	
O C T O B E R	22	Up!	RM Films International	Russ Meyer (director/screenplay); Raven De La Croix, Robert McLane, Kitten Natividad, Edward Schaaf, Candy Samples, Su Ling, Janet Wood, Linda Sue Ragsdale, Monty Bane, Marianne Marks, Larry Dean, Bob Schott, Foxy Lae, Ray Reinhardt, Elaine Collins	
O C T O B E R	24	The Seven-Per-Cent Solution	Universal Pictures / Alex Winitsky/Arlene Sellers Productions / Herbert Ross Productions	Herbert Ross (director); Nicholas Meyer (screenplay); Alan Arkin, Vanessa Redgrave, Robert Duvall, Nicol Williamson, Laurence Olivier, Joel Grey, Samantha Eggar, Charles Gray	
O C T O B E R	26	Monsieur Klein	Fox-Lira (France) / Titanus (Italy) / Lira Films / Adel Productions / Nova Films / Mondial Televisione Film	Joseph Losey (director); Franco Solinas, Fernando Morandi (screenplay); Alain Delon, Jeanne Moreau, Michael Lonsdale, Francine Bergé, Juliet Berto, Massimo Girotti, Magali Clément, Louis Seigner, Jean Bouise, Suzanne Flon, Michel Aumont, Roland Bertin, Jean Champion, Étienne Chicot, Pierre Vernier, Gérard Jugnot, Hermine Karagheuz	
O C T O B E R	31	Carry On England	The Rank Organisation	Gerald Thomas (director); David Pursall, Jack Seddon (screenplay); Kenneth Connor, Windsor Davies, Patrick Mower, Judy Geeson, Jack Douglas, Joan Sims, Peter Butterworth, Melvyn Hayes, Peter Jones, Diane Langton, Julian Holloway, David Lodge	
N O V E M B E R	1	Buffalo Rider	Starfire Films	John Fabian, Dick Robinson, George Lauris (directors); Mollie Gregory, Bill McCallum, Jim Cisler, Tom Manning, Peter Powell, Pete Cornacchia (screenplay); C. Lindsay Workman, Hal Smith, Rick Guinn, John Freeman, Rich Scheeland, George Sager, Dick Robinson, Priscilla Lauris	
N O V E M B E R	3	Carrie	United Artists / Red Bank Films	Brian De Palma (director); Lawrence D. Cohen (screenplay); Sissy Spacek, Piper Laurie, Amy Irving, William Katt, John Travolta, Nancy Allen, Betty Buckley, P.J. Soles, Priscilla Pointer, Sydney Lassick, Stefan Gierasch, Michael Talbott, Edie McClurg, Doug Cox, Harry Gold, Noelle North, Cindy Daly, Deirdre Berthrong, Anson Downes, Rory Stevens	
N O V E M B E R	5	John Carpenter's Assault on Precinct 13. (Los Angeles and New York City openings).	Turtle Releasing Organization / The CKK Corporation	John Carpenter (director/screenplay); Austin Stoker, Darwin Joston, Laurie Zimmer, Martin West, Tony Burton, Charles Cyphers, Nancy Loomis	
N O V E M B E R	10	The Next Man	Allied Artists Pictures Corporation	Richard C. Sarafian (director/screenplay); David M. Wolf, Morton S. Fine, Alan Trustman (screenplay); Sean Connery, Cornelia Sharpe, Albert Paulsen, Adolfo Celi, Marco St. John, Ted Beniades, Charles Cioffi, Jaime Sánchez	
N O V E M B E R	12				
N O V E M B E R	12	Two-Minute Warning	Universal Pictures / Filmways	Larry Peerce (director); Edward Hume (screenplay); Charlton Heston, John Cassavetes, Martin Balsam, Beau Bridges, Marilyn Hassett, David Janssen, Jack Klugman, Walter Pidgeon, Gena Rowlands, Brock Peters, David Groh, Mitchell Ryan, Joe Kapp, Pamela Bellwood	
N O V E M B E R	12	Welcome to L.A.	United Artists	Alan Rudolph (director/screenplay); Keith Carradine, Sally Kellerman, Geraldine Chaplin, Harvey Keitel, Lauren Hutton, Viveca Lindfors, Sissy Spacek, Denver Pyle, John Considine, Richard Baskin, James Remar, Tom Arnold, Diahnne Abbott, Allan F. Nicholls, Ron Silver	
N O V E M B E R	13	Alice, Sweet Alice	Allied Artists / Harristown Funding, Ltd.	Alfred Sole (director/screenplay); Rosemary Ritvo (screenplay); Linda Miller, Mildred Clinton, Brooke Shields, Jane Lowry, Louisa Horton, Antonino Rocca, Lillian Roth, Patrick Gorman	
N O V E M B E R	14	Sybil	NBC / Lorimar Productions	Daniel Petrie (director); Stewart Stern (screenplay); Sally Field, Joanne Woodward, Brad Davis, Martine Bartlett, Penelope Allen, Charles Lane, William Prince, Camila Ashland, Karen Obediear	
N O V E M B E R	19	The Last Tycoon	Paramount Pictures / Academy Pictures Corporation / Gelderse Maatschappij N.V.	Elia Kazan (director); Harold Pinter (screenplay); Robert De Niro, Tony Curtis, Robert Mitchum, Jeanne Moreau, Jack Nicholson, Donald Pleasence, Ray Milland, Dana Andrews, Ingrid Boulting, Theresa Russell, Tige Andrews, Morgan Farley, John Carradine, Jeff Corey, Diane Shalet, Seymour Cassel, Anjelica Huston	
N O V E M B E R	21	Rocky	United Artists / Chartoff-Winkler Productions	John G. Avildsen (director); Sylvester Stallone (screenplay); Sylvester Stallone, Talia Shire, Burt Young, Carl Weathers, Burgess Meredith, Thayer David, Joe Spinell, Al Silvani, George Memmoli, George O'Hanlon, Stan Shaw, Billy Sands, Pedro Lovell, DeForest Covan, Tony Burton, Shirley O'Hara, Frank Stallone, Lloyd Kaufman, Frank Stallone Jr., Joe Frazier, Michael Dorn, Arnold Johnson, Stu Nahan, Frank Pesce, Chino 'Fats' Williams	
N O V E M B E R	24	Shout at the Devil	American International Pictures / Tonav Productions	Peter R. Hunt (director); Stanley Price, Alastair Reid (screenplay); Lee Marvin, Roger Moore, Barbara Parkins, Ian Holm, Rene Kolldehoff, Horst Janson, Karl Michael Vogler, Maurice Denham, Jean Kent, Heather Wright, George Coulouris, Murray Melvin, Bernard Horsfall	
N O V E M B E R	27	Network nationwide 13 days after its previous (November 14) Los Angeles and New York City openings.	United Artists	Sidney Lumet (director); Paddy Chayefsky (screenplay); Faye Dunaway, William Holden, Peter Finch, Robert Duvall, Wesley Addy, Ned Beatty, Beatrice Straight, Jordan Charney	
D E C E M B E R	5	Bound for Glory	United Artists	Hal Ashby (director); Robert Getchell (screenplay); David Carradine, Ronny Cox, Melinda Dillon, Gail Strickland, Randy Quaid, Ji-Tu Cumbuka, Wendy Schaal, Bernie Kopell, Mary Kay Place, John Lehne, Elizabeth Macey, Susan Vaill, Guthrie Thomas	
D E C E M B E R	8	A Star Is Born	Warner Bros. / First Artists / Barwood Films	Frank Pierson (director/screenplay); John Gregory Dunne, Joan Didion (screenplay); Barbra Streisand, Kris Kristofferson, Gary Busey, Paul Mazursky, Joanne Linville, Oliver Clark, Venetta Fields, Clydie King, Sally Kirkland, Marta Heflin, Rita Coolidge, Tony Orlando, Susan Richardson, Robert Englund, Maidie Norman, Martin Erlichman, M.G. Kelly, Stephen Bruton, Donnie Fritts, Booker T. Jones, Art Munson, Charles Owens, Bobby Shew, Montrose, Sandy Helberg, Roslyn Kind	
D E C E M B E R	8	Silver Streak	20th Century Fox / Frank Yablans Presentations / Miller-Milkis Productions	Arthur Hiller (director); Colin Higgins (screenplay); Gene Wilder, Jill Clayburgh, Richard Pryor, Ned Beatty, Clifton James, Patrick McGoohan, Ray Walston, Scatman Crothers, Len Birman, Lucille Benson, Stefan Gierasch, Valerie Curtin, Richard Kiel, Fred Willard, Ed McNamara, Henry Beckman, Harvey Atkin, Bill Henderson, Robert Culp, J.A. Preston, Gordon Hurst	
D E C E M B E R	10	Alice in Wonderland	General National Enterprises / Cruiser Productions / Essex Pictures Company	Bud Townsend (director); Bucky Searles (screenplay); Kristine De Bell, Larry Gelman, Terri Hall, Gila Havana, Alan Novak, Jason Williams, Ron Nelson, Bucky Searles, J.P. Paradise, Bree Anthony, Tony Richards, Angel Barrett, Nancy Dare, Bruce Finklesteen, Juliet Graham, Astrid Hayase, John Lawrence, Ed Marshall, Melvina Peoples, Marcia Raven, Chris Steen	
D E C E M B E R	10	Queen Kong	Constantin Film / Cine-Art München / Dexter Film London	Frank Agrama (director/screenplay); Ron Dobrin, Fabio Piccioni (screenplay); Robin Askwith, Rula Lenska, Valerie Leon, Roger Hammond, Linda Hayden, John Clive, Carol Drinkwater, Vicki Michelle, Anna Bergman, Anthony Morton, Geraldine Gardner, Jeannie Collings	
D E C E M B E R	15	At the Earth's Core	American International Pictures / Amicus Productions	Kevin Connor (director); Milton Subotsky (screenplay); Doug McClure, Peter Cushing, Caroline Munro, Cy Grant, Godfrey James, Keith Barron, Robert Gillespie, Sean Lynch, Helen Gill, Anthony Verner, Michael Crane, Bobby Parr, Andee Cromarty	
D E C E M B E R	15	The Pink Panther Strikes Again	United Artists / Amjo Productions	Blake Edwards (director/screenplay); Frank Waldman (screenplay); Peter Sellers, Herbert Lom, Colin Blakely, Leonard Rossiter, Lesley-Anne Down, Burt Kwouk, André Maranne, Michael Robbins, Richard Vernon, Briony McRoberts, Dick Crockett, Byron Kane, Paul Maxwell, Gordon Rollings, Dudley Sutton, John Clive, Damaris Hayman, Deep Roy	
D E C E M B E R	15	Tracks	Trio	Henry Jaglom (director/screenplay); Dennis Hopper, Taryn Power, Dean Stockwell, Topo Swope, Alfred Ryder, Zack Norman, Frank McRae, James Frawley, Sally Kirkland, Michael Emil, Barbara Flood	
D E C E M B E R	17	The Shaggy D.A.	Walt Disney Productions / Buena Vista Distribution	Robert Stevenson (director); Don Tait (screenplay); Dean Jones, Suzanne Pleshette, Tim Conway, Keenan Wynn, Jo Anne Worley, Dick Van Patten, Vic Tayback, John Myhers	
D E C E M B E R	17	Freaky Friday	Walt Disney Productions / Buena Vista Distribution	Gary Nelson (director); Mary Rodgers (screenplay); Jodie Foster, Barbara Harris, John Astin, Patsy Kelly, Dick Van Patten, Vicki Schreck, Sorrell Booke, Kaye Ballard, Sparky Marcus, Marc McClure, Charlene Tilton, Alan Oppenheimer, Ruth Buzzi, Marie Windsor, Marvin Kaplan, Al Molinaro, Iris Adrian, Jack Sheldon, Laurie Main, Fritz Feld, Dermott Downs, James Van Patten	
D E C E M B E R	17	King Kong	Paramount Pictures / Dino De Laurentiis Corporation	John Guillermin (director); Lorenzo Semple Jr. (screenplay); Jeff Bridges, Charles Grodin, Jessica Lange, John Randolph, René Auberjonois, Ed Lauter, Julius Harris, Jack O'Halloran, Dennis Fimple, Mario Gallo, John Lone, John Agar, Sid Conrad, Garry Walberg, Corbin Bernsen, Joe Piscopo, Walt Gorney, Rick Baker, Peter Cullen, Jorge Moreno, Keny Long, George Whiteman, Wayne Heffley	
D E C E M B E R	18	The Cassandra Crossing	AVCO Embassy Pictures / ITC Entertainment / C. Cinematografica Champion s.p.a.	George P. Cosmatos (director/screenplay); Tom Mankiewicz, Robert Katz (screenplay); Sophia Loren, Richard Harris, Burt Lancaster, Ava Gardner, Martin Sheen, O. J. Simpson, Lee Strasberg, Ingrid Thulin, Lionel Stander, Ann Turkel, John Phillip Law, Alida Valli, Lou Castel, Ray Lovelock, Thomas Hunter, Carlo De Mejo, Renzo Palmer, John P. Dulaney, Stefano Patrizi, Fausta Avelli	
D E C E M B E R	20	Across the Great Divide	Pacific International Enterprises	Stewart Raffill (director/screenplay); Robert Logan, Heather Rattray, George Buck Flower, Frank Salsedo, Mark Edward Hall, Hal Bokar	
D E C E M B E R	21	Mikey and Nicky	Paramount Pictures / Castle Hill Productions	Elaine May (director/screenplay); Peter Falk, John Cassavetes, Ned Beatty, Rose Arrick, Carol Grace, William Hickey, Sanford Meisner, Joyce Van Patten, M. Emmet Walsh, Elaine May	
D E C E M B E R	21	Nickelodeon	Columbia Pictures / EMI Films / British Lion Films	Peter Bogdanovich (director/screenplay); W.D. Richter (screenplay); Ryan O'Neal, Burt Reynolds, Tatum O'Neal, Brian Keith, Stella Stevens, John Ritter, Jane Hitchcock, Brion James, Sidney Armus, Lorenzo Music, Jeffrey Byron, Priscilla Pointer, Philip Bruns, Frank Marshall, Harry Carey Jr., James Best, George Gaynes, M. Emmet Walsh, Miriam Byrd-Nethery, Les Josephson, Griffin O'Neal, Hamilton Camp, Joe Warfield, Elaine Partnow	
D E C E M B E R	22	The Enforcer	Warner Bros. / The Malpaso Company	James Fargo (director); Stirling Silliphant, Dean Riesner (screenplay); Clint Eastwood, Harry Guardino, Bradford Dillman, Tyne Daly, DeVeren Bookwalter, John Mitchum, Albert Popwell, John Crawford, Robert Hoy, Michael Cavanaugh, Dick Durock, M.G. Kelly, Terry McGovern, John Roselius, Rudy Ramos, Bill Ackridge, Jocelyn Jones, Samantha Doane	
D E C E M B E R	22	Voyage of the Damned (New York City, with its Los Angeles opening on the following day, 23rd.	AVCO Embassy Pictures / ITC Entertainment	Stuart Rosenberg (director); Steve Shagan, David Butler (screenplay); Faye Dunaway, Max von Sydow, Oskar Werner, Malcolm McDowell, Orson Welles, James Mason, Lee Grant	
D E C E M B E R	24	The Monkey Hustle	American International Pictures	Arthur Marks (director); Odie Hawkins, Charles Eric Johnson (screenplay); Yaphet Kotto, Rudy Ray Moore, Rosalind Cash, Thomas Carter, Debbi Morgan, Randy Brooks, Kirk Calloway, Lynn Harris, Donn Carl Harper	
D E C E M B E R	24	The Town That Dreaded Sundown	American International Pictures / Charles B. Pierce Film Productions, Inc.	Charles B. Pierce (director); Earl E. Smith (screenplay); Ben Johnson, Andrew Prine, Dawn Wells, Charles B. Pierce, Jimmy Clem, Jim Citty, Robert Aquino, Cindy Butler, Christine Ellsworth, Mike Hackworth, Misty West, Rick Hildreth, Steve Lyons, Bud Davis, Vern Stierman	
D E C E M B E R	24	In Search of Noah's Ark	Sunn Classic Pictures	James L. Conway (director/screenplay); Charles E. Seller Jr. (screenplay); Brad Crandall, Vern Adix	
D E C E M B E R	25	The Eagle Has Landed	Cinema International Corporation / ITC Entertainment	John Sturges (director); Tom Mankiewicz (screenplay); Michael Caine, Donald Sutherland, Robert Duvall, Jenny Agutter, Donald Pleasence, Anthony Quayle, Jean Marsh, Sven-Bertil Taube, Judy Geeson, Siegfried Rauch, John Standing, Treat Williams, Larry Hagman, Michael Byrne, Maurice Roeves, Keith Buckley, Jeff Conaway, Terry Plummer, David Gilliam, Kent Williams	

== See also ==
- List of 1976 box office number-one films in the United States
- 1976 in the United States
