= Golden Age of Porn =

Era of mainstream success for sexually explicit films (1969–1984)

- Part of the sexual revolution
- The film Blue Movie helped inaugurate the Golden Age of Porn.
- Date: 1969–1984
- Location: United States
- Participants: Porn producers, critics, porn fans, and celebrities
- Outcome: Box office success of porn; Critical appreciation of porn; Return to low-budget porn

The term "Golden Age of Porn", or "porno chic", refers to an approximate 15-year period (1969–1984) in commercial American pornography, in which sexually explicit films experienced positive attention from mainstream cinemas, movie critics, and the general public. This American period, which subsequently spread internationally, began on June 12, 1969, with the theatrical release of the film Blue Movie directed by Andy Warhol, and, somewhat later, with the release of the 1970 film Mona the Virgin Nymph produced by Bill Osco. These films were the first adult erotic films depicting explicit sex to receive wide theatrical release in the United States. Both influenced the making of films such as 1972's Deep Throat starring Linda Lovelace and directed by Gerard Damiano, Behind the Green Door starring Marilyn Chambers and directed by the Mitchell brothers, 1973's The Devil in Miss Jones also by Damiano, and 1976's The Opening of Misty Beethoven by Radley Metzger, the "crown jewel" of the Golden Age, according to author Toni Bentley. According to Andy Warhol, his Blue Movie film was a major influence in the making of Last Tango in Paris, an internationally controversial erotic drama film, starring Marlon Brando, and released in 1972, three years after Blue Movie was shown in theaters.

Following mentions by Johnny Carson on his popular Tonight Show and Bob Hope on TV as well, Deep Throat achieved major box-office success, despite being rudimentary by mainstream standards. In 1973, the more accomplished, but still low-budget, film The Devil in Miss Jones was the seventh most successful film of the year, and was well received by major media, including a favorable review by film critic Roger Ebert. The phenomenon of porn being publicly discussed by celebrities and taken seriously by critics – a development referred to, by Ralph Blumenthal of The New York Times, as "porno chic" – began for the first time in modern American culture. It became obvious that box-office returns of very low-budget adult erotic films could fund further advances in the technical and production values of porn, allowing it to compete with Hollywood films. There was concern that, left unchecked, the vast profitability of such films would lead to Hollywood being influenced by pornography.

Prior to this, thousands of U.S. state and municipal anti-obscenity laws and ordinances held that participating in the creation, distribution, or consumption of obscene films constituted criminal action. Multi-jurisdictional interpretations of obscenity made such films susceptible to prosecution and criminal liability for obscenity, thereby restricting their distribution and profit potential. Freedom in creative license, higher movie budgets and payouts, and a "Hollywood mindset" all contributed to this period.

With the increasing availability of videocassette recorders for private viewing in the 1980s, video supplanted film as the preferred distribution medium for pornography, which quickly reverted to being low-budget and openly gratuitous, ending the Golden Age.

== Background ==
Pornographic films were produced in the early 20th century as "stag" movies, intended to be viewed at male gatherings or in brothels. In the United States, social disapproval was so great that men in them sometimes attempted to conceal their face by subterfuge, such as a false mustache (used in A Free Ride) or even being masked. Very few people were ever identified as appearing in such films; and performers were often presumed to have been prostitutes or criminals. Vincent Drucci is said to have performed in a pornographic film made in 1924. Candy Barr, who appeared in the 1950s Smart Alec, was virtually unique among those appearing in stag films, having attained a degree of celebrity through her participation.

In the US, during the late 1960s, there was regular semi-underground production of pornographic films on a modest scale. After answering New York City newspaper advertisements for nude models, Eric Edwards and Jamie Gillis, among others, appeared in these films, which were silent black and white 'loops' of low quality, often intended for peep booth viewing in the proliferation of adult video arcades around Times Square. The product of the New York City porn industry was distributed nationwide by underworld figure Robert DiBernardo, who commissioned the production of much of the so-called 'Golden Age' era films made in New York City. Although not the first adult film to obtain a wide theatrical release in the US, none had achieved a mass audience, and changed public attitude toward pornography, as Deep Throat did.

== The era ==
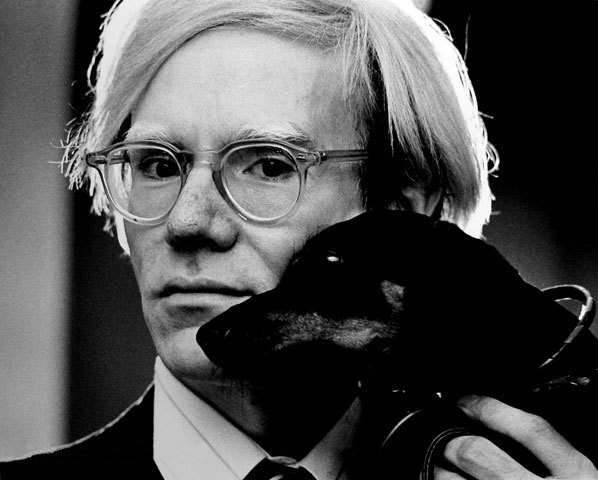
Andy Warhol

=== Beginnings ===
Blue Movie by Andy Warhol, released in June 1969, and, more freely, Mona, by Bill Osco, released afterwards in August 1970, were the first films depicting explicit sex to receive wide theatrical distribution in the United States. Blue Movie was reviewed in Variety. Although Blue Movie involved sexual intercourse, the film, starring Viva and Louis Waldon, included substantial dialogue about the Vietnam War and various mundane tasks. In comparison, the film Mona differed from Blue Movie by presenting more of a story plot: Mona (played by Fifi Watson) had promised her mother that she would remain a virgin until her impending marriage. Nonetheless, Blue Movie, besides being a seminal film in the 'Golden Age of Porn', was a major influence, according to Warhol, in the making of Last Tango in Paris (1972), an internationally controversial erotic drama film, starring Marlon Brando, and released a few years after Blue Movie was made.

Also around this time, in June 1970, the 55th Street Playhouse began showing Censorship in Denmark: A New Approach, a film documentary study of pornography, directed by Alex de Renzy. According to Vincent Canby, a New York Times film reviewer, the narrator of the documentary noted that "pornography is more stimulating and cheaper than hormone injections" and "stresses the fact that since the legalization of pornography in Denmark, sex crimes have decreased." Nonetheless, on September 30, 1970, Assistant District Attorney, Richard Beckler, had the theater manager, Chung Louis, arrested on an obscenity charge, and the film seized as appealing to a prurient interest in sex. The presiding judge, Jack Rosenberg, stated, “[The film] is patently offensive to most Americans because it affronts contemporary community standards relating to the description or representation of sexual matters.”

Nevertheless, afterwards, in October 1970, the History of the Blue Movie, another film documentary study of pornography directed by Alex de Renzy, was released and featured a compilation of early blue movie shorts dating from 1915 to 1970. Film critic Roger Ebert reviewed the film, rated it two-stars (of four), and noted that the narrator tells us "solemnly about the comic artistry of early stag movies".

In December 1971, Boys in the Sand was released and opened in theaters across the United States and around the world, and reviewed by Variety magazine. Featuring explicit all-male sex scenes, the film's title is a parodic reference to the gay-themed 1968 play by Mart Crowley, and the 1970 film adaptation The Boys in the Band. It led to the formation of several gay porn production houses, among the most notable, Falcon Studios and Hand In Hand Films.

=== Deep Throat ===
The 'Golden Age of Porn' continued in 1972 with Deep Throat. It officially premiered at the World Theater in New York City on June 12, 1972, and was advertised in The New York Times under the bowdlerized title Throat. After Johnny Carson talked about the film on his nationally top-rated TV show and Bob Hope, as well, mentioned it on TV, Deep Throat became very profitable and a box-office success, according to one of the figures behind the film. In its second year of release, Deep Throat just missed Variety's top 10. However, by then, it was often being shown in a double bill with the most successful of the top three adult erotic films released in the 1972–1973 era, The Devil in Miss Jones, which easily outperformed Deep Throat, while leaving Behind the Green Door trailing in third place.

=== The Devil in Miss Jones ===
The 1973 film The Devil in Miss Jones was ranked number seven in the Variety list of the top ten highest-grossing pictures of 1973, despite lacking the wide release and professional marketing of Hollywood and having been virtually banned across the country for half the year (see Miller v. California, below). Some critics have described the film as, along with Deep Throat, one of the "two best erotic motion pictures ever made". William Friedkin called The Devil in Miss Jones a "great film", partly because it was one of the few adult erotic films with a proper storyline. Roger Ebert referred to The Devil in Miss Jones as the "best" of the genre he had seen and gave it three-stars (of four). Ebert also suggested the film's box office receipts were inflated as a way of laundering the profits from illegal activities, although such a method would have required organized crime to be paying taxes on their illegally obtained income.

The Devil in Miss Jones was one of the first films to be inducted into the XRCO Hall of Fame. The sound-recording, cinematography, and story-line of The Devil in Miss Jones were of a considerably higher quality than any previous porn film. The lead, Georgina Spelvin, who had been in the original Broadway run of The Pajama Game, combined vigorous sex with an acting performance some thought as convincing as anything to be seen in a good mainstream production. She had been hired as a caterer, but Gerard Damiano, the film director, was impressed with her reading of Miss Jones's dialogue, while auditioning an actor for the non-sex role of 'Abaca'. According to Variety's review, "With The Devil in Miss Jones, the hard-core porno feature approaches an art form, one that critics may have a tough time ignoring in the future". The review also described the plot as comparable to Jean-Paul Sartre's play No Exit, and went on to describe the opening scene as, "a sequence so effective it would stand out in any legit theatrical feature." It finished by stating, "Booking a film of this technical quality into a standard sex house is tantamount to throwing it on the trash heap of most current hard-core fare."

=== "Porno chic" ===
An influential five-page article in The New York Times Magazine in 1973 described the phenomenon of porn being publicly discussed by celebrities and taken seriously by critics, a development referred to by Ralph Blumenthal of The New York Times as "porno chic". Some expressed the opinion that pornographic films would continue to extend their access to US theaters, and the mainstream film industry would gravitate toward the influence of porn. Several Golden Age films referred to mainstream film titles, including Alice in Wonderland (1976), Flesh Gordon (1974), The Opening of Misty Beethoven (1976) and Through the Looking Glass (1976).

=== Supreme Court's 1973 Miller v. California ===
Supreme Court's 1973 Miller v. California decision redefined obscenity from "utterly without socially redeeming value" to lacks "serious literary, artistic, political, or scientific value". Crucially, it made 'contemporary community standards' the criterion, holding that obscenity was not protected by the First Amendment; the ruling gave leeway to local judges to seize and destroy prints of films adjudged to violate local community standards. The Miller decision obstructed porn distribution. The Devil in Miss Jones, as well as Deep Throat and Behind the Green Door, were prosecuted successfully during the latter half of 1973; the Supreme Court's Miller decision closed much of America to the exhibition of adult erotic films, and often led to it being banned outright. Porn films would not feature as prominently in the mainstream movie business as they did in the Golden Age, until the emergence of the internet in the 1990s.

=== Post-1973 ===
In the aftermath of Miller v. California (1973), with the consequence of fragmenting distribution in the American film market and putting mass box office returns beyond the reach of pornographic films, the brief commercial foray into the production of pornographic films with higher artistic and cinematic production values that occurred between 1972 and 1973 was not sustained. With their relatively modest financial means, a predicted move of organized crime into Hollywood failed to materialize. Pornographic films continued to be a highly profitable business, and thrived throughout the rest of the 1970s, leading to the concept of porn "stars" gaining currency. Ostracism of porn performers meant they almost invariably used pseudonyms. Being outed as having appeared in porn usually put an end to an actor's hope of a mainstream career. An indication of the returns still possible was that a 1976 release, Alice in Wonderland: An X-Rated Musical Comedy, favorably reviewed by film critic Roger Ebert in 1976, reportedly grossed over $90 million globally. Some historians assess The Opening of Misty Beethoven, based on the play Pygmalion by George Bernard Shaw (and its derivative, My Fair Lady), and directed by Radley Metzger, as attaining a mainstream level in storyline and sets. Author Toni Bentley called the film the "crown jewel" of the Golden Age.

In general, after 1973, adult erotic films emulated mainstream filmmaking storylines and conventions, merely to frame the depictions of sexual activity to prepare an 'artistic merit' defense against possible obscenity charges. The adult film industry remained stuck at the level of 'one day wonders', finished by participants hired for only a single day. The ponderous technology of the time meant filming a simple scene would often take hours due to the need for the camera to be laboriously set up for each shot. Repeated sustained performances might be required on cue at any time over the course of a day, which could be difficult for men before the availability of Viagra and similar drugs. Production was concentrated in New York City where organized crime was widely believed to have control over all aspects of the business, and to prevent entry of competitors. Although their budgets were usually very low, a subcultural level of appreciation exists for films of this era, which were produced by a core group of around thirty performers, some of whom had other jobs. Several were actors who could handle dialogue when required. However, some participants scoffed at the idea that what they did qualified as "acting". By the early 1980s, the rise of home video had led to the end of the era when people went to movie theaters to see sex shot on 35mm film with production values, ultimately culminating with the rise of the internet in the 1990s and beyond.

== Feminist criticism ==
The 'Golden Age' was a period of interactions between pornography and the contemporaneous second wave of feminism. Radical and cultural feminists, along with religious and conservative groups, attacked pornography, while other feminists were pro-pornography, such as Camille Paglia, who defined what came to be known as sex-positive feminism in her work Sexual Personae. Paglia and other sex-positive or pro-pornography feminists accepted porn as part of the sexual revolution with its libertarian sexual themes, such as exploring bisexuality and swinging, free from government interference. The endorsement of female critics was essential for the credibility of the brief era of "porno chic".

== Golden Age stars ==
The Golden Age of Porn, between 1969 to 1984, was split into two waves: the first wave (the "porno chic" era), between the late 1960s to early 70s; and, the second wave reportedly "between the late 70s and early 80s".

Major pornographic film actors of the first part of the 'Golden Age', the "porno chic" era, included:

- Bobby Astyr
- Jack Birch
- Rene Bond
- Rebecca Brooke
- Robin Byrd
- Laura Cannon
- Rick Cassidy
- Marilyn Chambers
- Zebedy Colt
- Carol Connors
- Desireé Cousteau
- Casey Donovan
- Eric Edwards
- Samantha Fox
- Michael Gaunt
- Jamie Gillis
- Terri Hall
- Annette Haven
- John C. Holmes (a.k.a. "Johnny Wadd")
- Robert Kerman (a.k.a. "R Bolla")
- Johnny Keyes
- C. J. Laing
- Gloria Leonard
- John Leslie
- Linda Lovelace
- William Margold
- Sharon Mitchell
- Constance Money
- Wade Nichols
- Kay Parker
- George Payne
- Rhonda Jo Petty
- Darby Lloyd Rains
- Harry Reems
- Vanessa del Rio
- Candida Royalle
- Tina Russell
- Herschel Savage
- Serena
- Joey Silvera
- Fran Spector
- Georgina Spelvin
- Annie Sprinkle
- Marc Stevens
- Jessie St. James
- Paul Thomas
- Jennifer Welles
- Marlene Willoughby

== Second-wave stars ==
- Tracey Adams
- Juliet Anderson (a.k.a. "Aunt Peg")
- Colleen Brennan
- Jerry Butler
- Tom Byron
- Christy Canyon
- Désirée Cousteau
- Barbara Dare
- Billy Dee
- Lisa De Leeuw
- Debi Diamond
- Jeanna Fine
- Veronica Hart
- Nina Hartley
- Ryan Idol
- Ron Jeremy
- Angel Kelly
- Brigitte Lahaie
- Hyapatia Lee
- Traci Lords
- Amber Lynn
- Ginger Lynn
- Porsche Lynn
- Shauna Grant
- Shanna McCullough
- Kelly Nichols
- Peter North
- Seka
- Long Dong Silver
- Randy West
- Bambi Woods
- Jack Wrangler
- Ona Zee

At the time of the maturation of the second wave, movies increasingly were being shot on video for home release.

As their popularity rose, so did their control of their careers. John Holmes became the first recurring porn character in the "Johnny Wadd" film series directed by Bob Chinn. Lisa De Leeuw was one of the first to sign an exclusive contract with a major adult production company, Vivid Video, and Marilyn Chambers worked in mainstream movies, being one of the first of a small number of crossover porn actors.

== Producers ==
Major producers during the first wave of the 'Golden Age', the "Porno Chic" era, include:

- Shaun Costello
- Gerard Damiano
- Gregory Dark
- Alex de Renzy
- Radley Metzger (a.k.a. "Henry Paris")
- Andy Milligan
- Mitchell Brothers (Artie and Jim)
- Bill Osco
- Chuck Vincent
- Andy Warhol

With the rise of video, the dominant pornographic film studios of the Second Wave period were VCA Pictures and Caballero Home Video.

== Films of the period ==
Some of the best-known adult erotic films of the period include:

- Alice in Wonderland (US, 1976)
- Barbara Broadcast (US, 1977)
- Behind the Green Door (US, 1972)
- Blue Movie (US, 1969)
- Boys in the Sand (US, 1971)
- Café Flesh (US, 1982)
- Caligula (US-IT, 1979)
- Candy Stripers (US, 1978)
- Centurians of Rome (US, 1981)
- The Cheerleaders (US, 1973)
- Corruption (US, 1983)
- Dark Dreams (US, 1972)
- Debbie Does Dallas (US, 1978)
- Deep Throat (US, 1972)
- The Devil in Miss Jones (US, 1973)
- A Dirty Western (US, 1975)
- El Paso Wrecking Corp. (US, 1978)
- Femmes de Sade (US, 1976)
- Forced Entry (US, 1973)
- Harlot (US, 1971)
- Her Name Was Lisa (US, 1979)
- The Image (US, 1975)
- Insatiable (US, 1980)
- Inside Jennifer Welles (US, 1977)
- Kansas City Trucking Co. (US, 1976)
- L.A. Plays Itself (US, 1972)
- L.A. Tool & Die (US, 1979)
- Maraschino Cherry (US, 1978)
- Memories Within Miss Aggie (US, 1973)
- Mona the Virgin Nymph (US, 1970)
- Naked Came the Stranger (US, 1975)
- The New Comers (US, 1973)
- New Wave Hookers (US, 1985)
- New York City Inferno (France, 1978)
- A Night at the Adonis (US, 1978)
- Nightdreams (US, 1981)
- The Opening of Misty Beethoven (US, 1976)
- The Other Side of Aspen (US, 1978)
- Pink Narcissus (US, 1971)
- Pretty Peaches (US, 1978)
- The Private Afternoons of Pamela Mann (US, 1974)
- Reel People (US, 1984)
- Resurrection of Eve (US, 1973)
- Score (US, 1974)
- Sensations (NL, 1975)
- Spirit of Seventy Sex (US, 1976)
- The Story of Joanna (US, 1975)
- Taboo (US, 1980)
- The Tale of Tiffany Lust (US, 1979)
- Talk Dirty to Me (US, 1980)
- Through the Looking Glass (US, 1976)
- Wanda Whips Wall Street (US, 1982)
- Water Power (US, 1976)

== See also ==
- 55th Street Playhouse
- Boogie Nights – 1997 film about the Golden Age of Porn
- Dave's Old Porn − 2011 TV show discussing 1970s porn films
- The Deuce – 2017 TV show about the Golden Age of Porn
- Inside Deep Throat – 2005 documentary film
- Lovelace – 2012 film about Linda Lovelace, star of Deep Throat
- New Andy Warhol Garrick Theatre
- Ordeal – 1980 autobiography by Linda Lovelace
- Pornography in the United States
- The Rialto Report − archives of the Golden Age of Porn
- Sex in film
- Unsimulated sex

== General and cited references ==
- Lewis, Jon (2002). Hollywood v. Hard Core: How the Struggle Over Censorship Created the Modern Film Industry. NYU Press. ISBN 0-8147-5143-1.
- McNeil, Legs, Jennifer Osborne, and Peter Pavia (2005). The Other Hollywood: Uncensored Oral History of the Porn Film Industry. Regan Books. ISBN 0-06-009659-4.
- Rutledge, Leigh (1989). The Gay Fireside Companion. New York: Alyson. ISBN 1-55583-164-8.
- Spelvin, Georgina (2008). The Devil Made Me Do It. Lulu.com. ISBN 978-0-615-19907-8.
- Stevenson, Jack (2000). Fleshpot: Cinema's Sexual Myth Makers & Taboo Breakers. Critical Vision. ISBN 1-900486-12-1.
- Weitzer, Ronald John (2000). Sex for Sale: Prostitution, Pornography, and the Sex Industry. New York: Routledge. ISBN 0-415-92294-1.
