= The Vixens of Kung Fu =

1975 American pornographic exploitation film

- Promotional release poster
- Directed by: Bill Milling
- Written by: Cho En Young
- Produced by: Bill Milling
- Starring: Bree Anthony; Tony Richards; Peonies Jong; C. J. Laing
- Edited by: Texx Clevenger
- Production company: Chiang Productions
- Release date: January 1975
- Running time: 71 minutes
- Country: United States
- Language: English

The Vixens of Kung Fu (A Tale of Yin Yang) is a 1975 American pornographic martial arts exploitation film produced and directed by Bill Milling, under the pseudonym Chiang. It stars Bree Anthony, Tony Richards, Peonies Jong, and C. J. Laing, and follows a prostitute who is gang raped, and who seeks revenge against her rapists after being trained in kung fu with a clan of other women by a martial artist. The film received an X rating from the Motion Picture Association of America.

== Cast ==
- Bree Anthony as Prostitute (credited as Brie Anthony)
- Tony Richards as Monk (as Tony Blue)
- Peonies Jong as Ha Tien Sau (as Peonies Jung)
- C. J. Laing as Kung Fu Teacher
- Jamie Gillis as Hunter
- Bobby Astyr as Hunter
- Lin Chen Fu as Chao Tzu

== Critical reception ==
Brian Orndorf of Blu-ray.com called the film "a jarring viewing experience", and wrote that it "has no substance or dramatics, just a random assortment of poses from actors who don't have martial arts training". He concluded: "It should be fun, but it's a little too dark for comfort, with sex scenes more about domination than pleasure [...] It's all a big goof, and one that could use 100% less rape to be taken seriously as something light."

== Home media ==
In July 2013, The Vixens of Kung Fu was released on DVD by Vinegar Syndrome as a double feature with another 1975 film, Oriental Blue, also directed by Bill Milling. In 2018, Vinegar Syndrome released the film on Blu-ray as part of a five-disc collection titled 5 Films 5 Years - Volume #3.
