= The Opening of Misty Beethoven =

1976 pornographic film directed by Radley Metzger

- Original film poster
- Directed by: Radley Metzger (as "Henry Paris")
- Written by: Radley Metzger (as "Jake Barnes")
- Produced by: Ava Leighton (as "L. Sultana")
- Starring: Constance Money; Jamie Gillis; Jacqueline Beudant; Gloria Leonard; Terri Hall
- Cinematography: Paul Glickman (as "Robert Rochester")
- Edited by: Bonnie Karrin
- Music by: George Craig; Gioacchino Rossini
- Distributed by: Catalyst Productions; Joy Bear Pictures; VCA Pictures
- Release date: 19 March 1976
- Running time: 86 minutes
- Country: United States
- Language: English

The Opening of Misty Beethoven is a 1976 American pornographic comedy film written and directed by Radley Metzger (credited as "Henry Paris" and "Jake Barnes"). It was produced with a relatively high budget and filmed on elaborate locations in Paris, New York City and Rome with a musical score.

According to author Toni Bentley, The Opening of Misty Beethoven is considered the "crown jewel" of the Golden Age of Porn (1969–1984).

== Plot ==
In Pigalle, Seymour watches a porn film in a theater when Misty, a call girl, offers him a handjob. Once she finishes a pre-arranged handjob session with a man dressed as Napoleon, she takes Seymour to her brothel. There, his probing questionnaire irritates her, prompting her to ask him to leave. Meanwhile, Seymour overhears his friend Geraldine's voice. Mid-intercourse in the "cowgirl" position, Geraldine converses with Seymour. Geraldine and Seymour meet up with Misty, who slaps him.

Seymour offers Misty a job. After some contemplation, she agrees and accompanies Seymour to the United States. On the flight, a stewardess performs blowjob on a passenger, indicating a world where public sex is normalized.

In the U.S., Seymour begins grooming Misty to win Lawrence Layman's "Most Exciting New Girl of the Season" title in Goldenrod magazine. She is initiated into various sexual acts—receiving cum facials, anal and oral dildo training, and handjob techniques. Geraldine demonstrates a blowjob. Misty initially hesitates but gradually becomes more confident.

En route to Rome, Misty is fondled and orally pleasured by a woman. Their Roman hotel is filled with orgies; Geraldine performs fellatio on a waiter. Misty's first assignment places her in the company of Alfredo and his wife. In their car, she performs fellatio on Alfredo. Meanwhile, Seymour receives a blowjob from a waitress. At the opera, Misty fondles Alfredo and engages in anal sex with him in a restroom. The incident becomes a sensation in Rome. Misty's name spreads rapidly.

At the hotel, Seymour continues her training—having her give simultaneous blowjobs and handjobs to three unresponsive waiters. He then assigns her to seduce Jacque, a gay artist in Geneva. During his briefing—delivered while receiving a blowjob—Geraldine also performs fellatio on a waiter.

Seymour sends his ally Tanya to Geneva, where she poses as a maid and secretly photographs Jacque's home. In rehearsals, Tanya plays Misty, and Geraldine plays Jacque. They simulate seduction, including nipple sucking and oral sex. Misty observes as Seymour and Tanya engage in blowjob, missionary, and "cowgirl" sex, culminating with Seymour ejaculating on Tanya.

The next morning, Seymour encounters Geraldine receiving cunnilingus from a waiter. Misty expresses discomfort with the Geneva assignment, citing its cheating nature. Seymour persuades her by confessing his feelings for her and promising dinner afterward. In Geneva, Misty visits Jacque and follows the rehearsal steps—kissing, nipple sucking, fellatio, and intercourse in "cowgirl"—ultimately succeeding in seducing him. She continues despite ejaculation.

Seymour celebrates Misty's success with orgy. Her seduction of a gay turned her into an even bigger phenomenon, but it leaves her disillusioned. Geraldine receives a cunnilingus while Misty badmouths Seymour. Unapologetic when confronted, Misty returns to her routine—performing blowjob for three waiters. This time, she successfully arouse and bring them to ejaculate. Alone, she cries.

Later, at a party at Lawrence's studio, Misty meets Lawrence and his wife Barbara. Barbara kisses and performs cunnilingus on Misty, who reciprocates. Lawrence joins, and the trio engage in oral sex. He performs missionary intercourse with Misty while Barbara anally stimulate him. Misty dons a strap-on dildo and anally penetrates Lawrence as he penetrates Barbara.

Elsewhere, Seymour, dressed as Caesar, receives fellatio from Geraldine in an orgy. He boasts of manipulating Misty into the Geneva assignment by pretending to love her. Misty overhears this and, feeling betrayed, announces she is leaving him for Lawrence. Her new act with Lawrence becomes an overnight sensation.

Back in New York, Seymour is dejected. At home, while being fellated by a rotating line of waitresses, he reminisces about Misty. As he wonders what she might be doing, the next waitress is revealed to be Misty. She begins to suck Seymour, who remains unaware. Seymour eventually realizes it is her but pretends not to know, mockingly recalling her poor fellatio. In response, she bites his penis. They reconcile, kiss, and have vigorous sex in multiple positions—missionary, lap-sitting, cunnilingus, and nipple sucking, ending with Seymour thrusting even after ejaculation.

In the streets, people gossip about the "last Goldenrod girl" who vanished, her name already fading from memory. Misty is shown oral training new recruits, receiving cunnilingus herself, while a bound and submissive Seymour sits obediently by her side.

== Cast ==
- Constance Money as Misty Beethoven
- Jamie Gillis as Dr. Seymour Love
- Calvin Culver (aka Casey Donovan) as Jacque Beudant, art dealer
- Jacqueline Beudant as Geraldine Rich
- Gloria Leonard as Barbara Layman
- Terri Hall as Tanya
- Mark Margolis as unhappy man on plane

== Production ==
An adult erotic take on George Bernard Shaw's 1913 play Pygmalion, and its 1956 musical adaptation My Fair Lady, the film follows a sexologist who tries transforming a low-skilled prostitute into a goddess of passion. Her instruction includes seducing a gay male art dealer (played by gay porn actor Casey Donovan), pleasing three men at once, pegging a man, and similar sexual conquests. Shaw's character of Henry Higgins here becomes the sexologist Dr. Seymour Love, played by Jamie Gillis. Shaw's character of Eliza Doolittle here becomes Dolores "Misty" Beethoven, played by Constance Money. Shaw's Colonel Pickering here becomes Geraldine Rich, played by Jacqueline Beudant.

== Notes ==
The film was released during the Golden Age of Porn (inaugurated by the 1969 release of Andy Warhol's Blue Movie) and the phenomenon of "porno chic" in the United States, in which adult erotic films were just beginning to be widely released, publicly discussed by celebrities (such as Johnny Carson and Bob Hope) and taken seriously by film critics (such as Roger Ebert).

In this Golden Age era, most films of the time were expected to have at least minimal plots. Misty's plot was more elaborate than most; it was based directly on Shaw's play, Pygmalion, as well as the Broadway and Hollywood success My Fair Lady. Some historians assess The Opening of Misty Beethoven as attaining a mainstream level in storyline and sets. Author Toni Bentley called the film the "crown jewel" of the Golden Age. The film is also satirical, with many added comic touches and dialogue designed for laughs. It includes Mark Margolis's first role. The Opening of Misty Beethoven has the distinction of being the first widely released porn movie to feature female-on-male pegging.

The Italian Edition by Noctuno is an extended version of Misty Beethoven with footage not seen in the original film. Some of the extra footage was used in Barbara Broadcast (Misty's bondage sequence) and Maraschino Cherry (Misty with the matador). All other cutting room floor footage can be found in the Distribpix Misty Beethoven DVD extras. The film was initially rejected for UK cinema by the BBFC and released in a heavily pre-edited form with an additional 1 min 55 secs of censor cuts in 1983. The fully uncut hardcore print was passed with an R18 rating by the BBFC in 2005. It is rumored that the full uncut version was released in the U.S on Laser Disc by Lorimar Home Video. It was also said the Laser Disc Print runs at 87 minutes and has 1:33 ratio. The cool (softcore) version adds several scenes to pad the running time. They include: the servants celebrating at the Italian villa in cave-person outfits, Lawrence and Barbara watching Kojak on TV, Misty and Geraldine together in a tub and, last but not least, cigar guy's female partner on the plane talking to a dejected Seymour Love.

According to reviewer Steve Gallagher, Radley Metzger's films, including those made during the Golden Age of Porn (1969–1984), are noted for their "lavish design, witty screenplays, and a penchant for the unusual camera angle". Claire Simpson noted that his films were "highly artistic – and often cerebral ... and often featured gorgeous cinematography". Film and audio works by Metzger have been added to the permanent collection of the Museum of Modern Art (MoMA) in New York City.

== 2012 restoration ==
In 2012, DistribPix oversaw a complete restoration of the film, with the full cooperation of the director. The result had a limited exhibition in theaters, but the main outcome of the project was the first-ever official DVD and Blu-ray releases.

== Awards ==
Awards from the Adult Film Association of America:

- Best Picture
- Best Director (Radley Metzger as "Henry Paris")
- Best Actor (Jamie Gillis)
- Best Screenplay (Radley Metzger as "Jake Barnes")
- Best Editing (Bonnie Karrin)

=== Other awards ===
- 2002 AVN Award – "Best Classic DVD"
- The film was one of the first to be inducted into the XRCO Hall of Fame.

== Music soundtrack ==
The Opening Of Misty Beethoven Motion Picture Soundtrack

Soundtrack album by Various
- Released: 2012
- Genre: 1:10:56
- Label: Distribpix Inc.

During the 2012 restoration of the film, a fully annotated CD soundtrack was released.

No.	Title	Length
1.	"The Absolute Nadir Of Passion"	0:25
2.	"Mighty Atom"	2:55
3.	"Let's Get You Undressed"	0:45
4.	"Bourbon"	3:37
5.	"New York vs. Rome"	0:05
6.	"William Tell Overture – Finale"	3:44
7.	"Happy Landings"	0:14
8.	"Glass Tubes"	3:20
9.	"Ripe Mango, Take Two"	0:05
10.	"Confunktion"	4:33
11.	"Regarding Aquarians"	0:11
12.	"The Fuzz"	0:15
13.	"Say We Had Fun"	2:47
14.	"Heat Haze"	2:47
15.	"Hyman Mandell"	0:44
16.	"Ippica / Going Great"	2:28
17.	"Jamaican Cigars"	0:12
18.	"Giovane Flirt"	3:21
19.	"That Perilous Journey"	0:13
20.	"Rebel"	4:11
21.	"Stay! You Can Have Caesar!"	0:11
22.	"Teorma / Thin Ice"	2:04
23.	"Is That Your Real Name?"	0:11
24.	"Door To Paradise"	2:43
25.	"Birth Of A Generation"	2:44
26.	"The Big One"	4:07
27.	"Hombre Solo"	2:04
28.	"George Craig Interview"	20:00

== Remake ==
In 2004, Misty Beethoven: The Musical!, a musical remake, was released. It featured Sunset Thomas, Randy Spears, Julie Meadows, Asia Carrera, Chloe, Dave Cummings, Mike Horner, Evan Stone and Tyce Bune. It was directed by Veronica Hart. The film won the 2004 XRCO Award for "Best Comedy or Parody" and the 2005 AVN Award for "Best Sex Comedy".

== See also ==
- Andy Warhol filmography
- Erotic art
- Erotic films in the United States
- Erotic photography
- List of American films of 1976
- Sexual content in film
- Unsimulated sex
- Pretty Woman (1990)
