= Unwilling Lovers =

- Film poster
- Directed by: Zebedy Colt
- Written by: Zebedy Colt
- Produced by: Leonard Kirtman
- Starring: Terri Hall; John Bush; Holly Bush; C. J. Laing; Zebedy Colt; Rod Dumont; Jody Maxwell; Annie Sprinkle
- Cinematography: C. Davis Smith
- Edited by: C. Davis Smith
- Production company: Taurus Productions
- Release date: 1977 (United States)
- Running time: 86 minutes
- Country: United States
- Language: English

Unwilling Lovers (also known as Mama's Boy and Young Lovers) is a 1977 pornographic horror film written and directed by Zebedy Colt and starring Terri Hall, John Bush, Holly Bush, C. J. Laing, Zebedy Colt, Rod Dumont, Jody Maxwell, and Annie Sprinkle.

== Plot ==
Agnes Benson, an elderly and paraplegic recluse, hires Jenny Merlin to care for her and her adult son, Timmy. Timmy is a skilled mimic who has the mentality of a child due to witnessing the accident that disabled his mother, and killed his father. Not long after being hired by Mrs. Benson, Jenny has sex with the woman's handyman, Charlie. When Timmy catches the two of them together, Charlie tells him that he and Jenny were only "sunbathing".

Timmy leaves to run an errand, and spots a couple having sex in the woods. When the man leaves to get cigarettes, Timmy approaches the woman, who panics and tries to run away, dying when she hits her head on a rock after being tripped by Timmy, who believes that they are playing a game. Oblivious to the woman's death, Timmy engages in intercourse with her body, and leaves when he hears the girl's boyfriend approaching.

Timmy returns home, and when his mother notices that his pants are unfastened, she angrily lectures him on the evils of sex, and comforts and sedates him when he has an outburst. While Timmy sleeps, Mrs. Benson reveals to Jenny that she was paralyzed when her drunk husband, who had tried to kill her, fell off of a cliff, and dragged her down with him. Timmy awakens, spies on Charlie fondling Jenny, delivers a package to a neighbor, and notices a husband forcing himself on his wife, which causes Timmy to flash back to his father attacking his mother. Timmy bludgeons the husband with a rock, and accidentally asphyxiates the wife while trying to calm her down. Thinking that the wife is playing the same "game" as his previous female victim, Timmy sexually assaults her corpse, then eats a chocolate bar, unaware of exactly what he has done. The media dub the killings "the Candy Bar Murders" because of the discarded sweets wrapper left at the current crime scene, and the earlier one.

Jenny and Charlie discuss their relationship, and begin to make love, when Timmy walks in on them. For his own amusement, Charlie gives Timmy wine and drugs, and invites him to participate in a borderline-bisexual threeway with him and Jenny. Later, Timmy is shown approaching another couple, which is followed by a shot of a newspaper which reads, "Another Candy Bar Murder!" Afterward, Timmy goes into the city with Charlie, and they pick up a pair of prostitutes, who they treat roughly, and make it clear to them that they will not be paying. Charlie leaves Timmy with the hookers, one of whom tries to rob him at knifepoint, angered over being mistreated. A struggle ensues, ending with Timmy stabbing one woman, strangling the other, and taking the knife.

Mrs. Benson and Jenny discuss the killings, and notice the knife Timmy has, and that he is eating the same brand of candy bars whose wrappers were left at the murder sites. Jenny believes that Charlie is the killer, but when she questions Timmy, she realizes it is him. Timmy chases and sexually assaults Jenny, but before he can kill her, he is talked down by Charlie, and runs back home; Timmy has remembered that his father caught his mother having an affair, and that she was making plans to abandon him ...... and that she knocked him off of the cliff after he raped her in retaliation.

Timmy confronts his mother, who intends to fatally overdose him with sedatives. She confesses that everything he has recalled is true, and that she never wanted him. Minutes later, a police officer called by Mrs. Benson arrives, and sees Timmy tending to the garden. The officer questions Timmy about all of the people he has "played" with, and discovers that Timmy has slit his mother's throat, and raped her body. As the policeman stands there in shock, Timmy asks, "Want a candy bar?"

== Cast ==
- Jody Maxwell as Jenny Merlin
- Terri Hall as Girl with Joey
- C. J. Laing as Hooker with Purse
- Annie Sprinkle as Hooker with Stole
- John Bush as Guy Near Creek
- Holly Bush as Girl Near Creek
- Zebedy Colt as Timmy Benson/Jonathan Benson
- Rod Dumont as Charlie
- Renee Sanz as Agnes Benson
- Nancy Dare as Marcy
- Peter Andrews as Lee
- Bernie Cohan
- Manfred
- John Lawrence
- Chad Lambert as Joey

== Release ==
Unwilling Lovers premiered in 1977 and was later distributed on VHS by both Alpha Blue Archives and Wonderful World of Video. To date, the film has not received a DVD release, though scenes from it are included as a bonus feature in the DVD of Sex Wish, released in 2004 by Alpha Blue Archives.

== Reception ==
Zebedy Colt's performance as Timmy Benson was deemed "twisted and brilliant" by Mike Desert of AVN. Recarts.Movies.Erotica commended the film's acting and plot, and called it "a 70's collector's must have movie".
