= Michael H. Kenyon =

American criminal

Michael Hubert Kenyon (born c. 1944 in Elgin, Illinois), also known as the "Illinois Enema Bandit", is an American criminal. He pleaded guilty to a decade-long series of armed robberies of female victims, some of which involved sexual assaults in which he would give them enemas. He is also known as the "Champaign Enema Bandit", the "Ski Masked Bandit", and/or simply the "Enema Bandit".

== Attacks and convictions ==
The earliest attacks Kenyon was accused of having committed were on two teenage sisters in March 1966 in Champaign, Illinois. Kenyon graduated from the University of Illinois at Urbana-Champaign in 1967 and subsequently left the state. The attacks thus ended in Champaign but started anew in Manhattan, Kansas; Norman, Oklahoma; and Los Angeles, California.

Kenyon returned to Champaign, and the attacks resumed, in 1972. In May 1975, Kenyon took a job as an auditor for the Illinois Department of Revenue in Lincolnwood, Illinois. He then committed additional attacks, including those on three Cook County flight attendants. He also attacked four women in an Urbana sorority house, one of whom was administered an enema. He was involved in a minor traffic accident later that night, but was not arrested.

Kenyon was eventually apprehended in suburban Chicago a few weeks later in connection with a number of robberies there. During questioning he began to talk about the enema bandit. After his arrest he was judged to be legally sane; in December 1975, he pleaded guilty to six counts of armed robbery and was sentenced to six to twelve years in prison for each count, but was never charged for the enema assaults. He was paroled in 1981 after serving six years.

== In popular culture ==
- In the 1974 novel The Odd Woman, written by Gail Godwin, the protagonist, Jane Clifford, a professor in a Midwestern university town, fears the Enema Bandit, who represents her fears of losing control of her life.
- The crimes of which Kenyon was accused were the inspiration for the 1976 adult film Water Power, starring Jamie Gillis, which was later reissued under the title Enema Bandit. The term "enema bandit" came into wider use following the incidents.
- Kenyon became the subject of Frank Zappa's song "The Illinois Enema Bandit", that he and his group played live from September 1975, was recorded live in December 1976 and first released on Zappa in New York (1978). After the song's first live performance, Zappa made it part of the set list of every subsequent tour, including his final tour in 1988.
- Jazz composer Henry Threadgill recorded "Salute to the Enema Bandit" on the 1986 album Air Show No. 1.
- British metal band, Lawnmower Deth, recorded a song titled "The Illinois Enema Bandit" on their album "Return of the Fabulous Metal Bozo Clowns"
