= C. J. Laing =

American pornographic actress

C.J. Laing
- Born: New York City, U.S.
- Other names: Jessie Savage; C.J. Lang; Chris Jackson; Gwen Starr; Gwen Fisher; Jessy Lang
- Occupation: Adult entertainment performer

C.J. Laing is an American former adult entertainment performer, appearing in films during the Golden Age of Porn in the 1970s. She is a member of the AVN Hall of Fame and the XRCO Hall of Fame.

== Adult film career ==
C.J. Laing, a native of New York, was living in San Francisco. A fan of 1970s San Francisco music, she hitchhiked there and stayed in a communal house with the Angels of Light. To earn extra money, she auditioned for the Mitchell brothers and appeared in a "loop" as part of the series Juke Joint. In New York, the Mitchell brothers introduced Laing to the Buckley brothers who cast her in her first feature film with Jamie Gillis in 1974 under the name Gwen Starr.

Laing appeared in over 50 films and "loops" during the 1970s and is best known for her roles in Anyone But My Husband and Barbara Broadcast.

Laing is quoted in Time magazine as saying: "I purposely would not act, I despised the people in these films that said they were actors. I was like, 'You've got to be kidding me! This is about fucking and sucking!'"

During the late 1970s, Laing performed live shows at the Mitchell Brothers O'Farrell Theatre and other theaters owned by the Mitchell Brothers.

Laing was inducted into the X-Rated Critics Organization Hall of Fame as a "Film Pioneer" in 1989. In 2005, she was also inducted into the AVN Hall of Fame as "one of the most exciting stars of the so-called Golden Age of porn" and as "an energetic performer who turned in some of the strongest performances of her time."

== Partial filmography ==
- Oriental Blue (1975)
- Anyone But My Husband (1975)
- The Vixens of Kung Fu (1975)
- Sweet Punkin (1976)
- Water Power (1976)
- Barbara Broadcast (1977)
- Unwilling Lovers (1977)
- Little Orphan Sammy (1977)
- Maraschino Cherry (1978)
