= On the Prowl (film series) =

1980s and 1990s series of pornographic videos filmed by Jamie Gillis

On the Prowl is a series of pornographic videos filmed by Jamie Gillis in the late 1980s and early 1990s. The video series is considered to be a watershed entry in the pro-amateur field and is credited as one of the first gonzo videos ever shot. The series is the basis for one of the scenes in the 1997 film Boogie Nights. The basis of the films centered on Gillis approaching random men with the invitation of free sex with a professional pornographic actress or paid escort. Filming locations would range from limousines to adult bookstores and the series was noted for its degradation of the women filmed during the series, who would take part in various elements such as golden showers, anilingus, and occasionally physical violence.

The first video, shot in 1989, was set in North Beach, San Francisco and starred Gillis along with adult film actress Rene Morgan (sometimes spelled as Renee Morgan) and cameraman Duck Dumont. On the Prowl 1 was shot in one night and was sold for $20, which Gillis claimed was twice what the normal asking price was for other adult tapes. The first film received some attention for one of the male performers, a sailor that was placed in the brig and threatened with a military discharge from service.

Of the film series' depiction in the Boogie Nights series, Gillis was unhappy and dismissive, saying that he felt that they "took it and made it into a very depressing and kind of ugly thing .... I mean, I've done a lot of sleazy movies and things in my life, but I never felt dirtier than after I saw Boogie Nights. I said, Oh my god, they're taking my little joy, my little treasure, and shitting on it, making it ugly and stupid and violent."

== Filmography ==
- On the Prowl (1989)
- On the Prowl II
- Back on the Prowl 2
- Back on the Prowl 3
- Back on the Prowl 4
- On the Prowl in Paris

== Sources ==
- Sloan, Will (November 21, 2013). "The Godfather of Gonzo Porn". Hazlitt. Random House of Canada.
