= The Story of Joanna =

1975 film by Gerard Damiano

- Film poster
- Directed by: Gerard Damiano
- Screenplay by: Gerard Damiano
- Based on: Story of O by Dominique Aury
- Produced by: Gerard Damiano
- Starring: Jamie Gillis; Terri Hall; Zebedy Colt; Juliet Graham; Steven Lark
- Cinematography: Harry Flecks
- Production company: Blueberry Hill Films
- Distributed by: Gloria; Video Home Library; Adult Video Corporation; Alpha Blue Archives; TVX
- Release date: November 26, 1975 (New York)
- Running time: 84 minutes
- Country: United States
- Language: English

The Story of Joanna is a 1975 pornographic film directed by Gerard Damiano and starring Jamie Gillis and Terri Hall. The film has a sado-masochism theme influenced by Story of O (1954). It is considered one of the classics of the Golden Age of Porn (1969–1984). It has been inducted into the XRCO Hall of Fame.

== Cast ==
- Jamie Gillis as Jason
- Terri Hall as Joanna
- Zebedy Colt as Griffin
- Juliet Graham as Gena
- Steven Lark as Dancer

== Reception ==
Roger Feelbert from Pornonomy gave the film a B− rating, stating: "Technically, the film looked great - in particular, the scene between Graham and Colt would have to rank as one of the best shot hardcore scenes I can remember - but suffers from uneven pacing. It's dark in tone, but not as arresting as, say, 3 AM or Damiano's Devil in Miss Jones. I'm glad I saw it, but there's little chance I'll ever revisit (except, maybe, to check out that Graham/Colt scene.)."

== See also ==
- List of American films of 1975
