= Terri Hall =

American actress

- Born: Terri Marie Hall; January 25, 1953; Elmira, New York, U.S.
- Died: June 5, 2007 (aged 54); Elmira, New York, U.S.
- Other names: Terry Remmick; Terrie Hall; Terry Hall; Judy Holland; National Velvet
- Occupation: Erotic actress

Terri Hall (born Terri Marie Hall; January 25, 1953 – June 5, 2007) was an American erotic actress in adult films from 1974 to 1984, during the Golden Age of Porn (1969–1984). Notable films include: Alice In Wonderland (1976), The Opening of Misty Beethoven (1975), The Story of Joanna (1975), Through the Looking Glass (1976) and The World of Henry Paris (1981). Hall worked with several notable adult film directors, including Gerard Damiano, Radley Metzger (aka "Henry Paris") and Bill Osco. She was a former ballet dancer and, as well, served as a model for photographers, such as Robert Mapplethorpe, and artists, such as Sir Alex Schloss and Gloria Schloss. Hall was featured in several US magazines, including Playboy and Sir!. Her work as a model has been displayed at the Whitney Museum of American Art.

== Early life ==
Terri Hall was born in 1953 to a father of Swedish and a mother of Italian heritages. Along with a sister and two brothers, Hall grew up in Elmira, New York. Her father was an attorney. Hall began dancing lessons at the age of 5. After high school, she went to New York City and began training at the Harkness Ballet. As a trained ballerina, Hall danced with the American Ballet Theatre, Monte Carlo City Ballet and the Stuttgart Ballet Company.

== Career ==
In order to make more money than available to her in dancing, Hall decided to broaden her career into acting. An actress friend suggested she meet with several adult film directors, including Armand Weston who first gave Hall an interview. She later starred in one of Weston's films, The Taking of Christina, in 1976. Over her years as an actress, Hall worked with several notable adult film directors, including Gerard Damiano, Radley Metzger (aka "Henry Paris") and Bill Osco.

== Personal life ==
Hall left the adult industry in 1984. Later, due to ill health, she lived in a nursing home in Athens, Pennsylvania, and died of cancer in upstate New York in June 2007.

== Films (selected) ==
Some of Terri Hall's best-known adult erotic films of the period are:

- Gladys and Her All-Girl Band (1975)
- Oriental Blue (1975)
- The Story of Joanna (1975)
- Farewell Scarlet (1975)
- The Amazing Dr. Jekyll (1975)
- New Loops (1975)
- The Divine Obsession (1976)
- Honey Pie (1976)
- Ecstasy in Blue (1976)
- Once Over Nightly (1976)
- The Opening of Misty Beethoven (1976)
- Seduction (1976)
- The Taking of Christina (1976)
- Dominatrix Without Mercy (1976)
- Fantasex (1976)
- Rollerbabies (1976)
- The Honeymooners (1976)
- Alice in Wonderland: An X-Rated Musical Fantasy (1976)
- Through the Looking Glass (1976)
- The Double Exposure of Holly (1976)
- Sex Wish (1976)
- Gums (1976)
- More, More, More (1976)
- Terri's Revenge! (1976)
- Suzie's Take Out Service (1976)
- Pornocopia Sensual (1976)
- Odyssey: The Ultimate Trip (1977)
- The Devil Inside Her (1977)
- My Sex-Rated Wife (1977)
- Lustful Feelings (1977)
- Teenage Pajama Party (1977)
- Virgin Dreams (1977)
- Unwilling Lovers (1977)
- Sweetheart (1977)
- The Ganja Express (1978)
- Street Girls of New York (1981)
- Sugar Britches (1981)
- The World of Henry Paris (1981)
