= Water Power (film) =

- Theatrical poster
- Directed by: Shaun Costello
- Screenplay by: Shaun Costello
- Produced by: Shaun Costello
- Cinematography: Bill Markle
- Edited by: Shaun Costello
- Music by: Alvar Stugard
- Distributed by: Star Distributors
- Release date: 1976 (United States)
- Running time: 84 minutes
- Country: United States
- Language: English
- Budget: $18,000

Water Power is a pornographic film directed by Shaun Costello. Released circa 1976, it was loosely based on the real-life exploits of the Illinois "Enema bandit", Michael H. Kenyon, who administered forced enemas to female college students in the 1960s and 1970s. The film stars Jamie Gillis as a disturbed loner.

== Cast ==
- Jamie Gillis as Burt
- John Buco as Jack Gallagher
- C.J. Laing as Irena Murray
- Eric Edwards as The Doctor
- Marlene Willoughby as The Nurse
- Gloria Leonard as Hostess at the Garden of Eden
- Clea Carson as Stewardess
- Long Jeanne Silver as The Patient
- Crystal Sync as Barbara
- Philip Marlowe as Police Captain
- Susaye London as Ginger
- Barbara Belkin as Candy
- Craig Esposito as Police Station Cop with Typewriter
- Sharon Mitchell as Eve
- Sally O'Neil
- Shaun Costello as Police Station Cop/Man at Car Window
- Fred Keitel
- Leo Lovemore as Stewardess's Boyfriend
- Peter Christian
- Beverly Steig
- Roger Caine
