= Maraschino Cherry (film) =

1978 film by Radley Metzger

- DVD cover
- Directed by: Radley Metzger (as "Henry Paris")
- Written by: Radley Metzger (as "Jake Barnes")
- Produced by: Morton Berman
- Starring: Annette Haven; C. J. Laing; Constance Money; Eric Edwards; Gloria Leonard; Lesllie Bovee; Michael Gaunt; Susan McBain; Wade Nichols
- Cinematography: Chico Carter; Larry Revene (uncredited)
- Edited by: Harvey Katz
- Music by: Music Sound Track Service
- Distributed by: Mature Pictures Corporation (as Maturpix); Video-X-Pix (USA)
- Release date: October 20, 1978 (USA)
- Running time: 85 minutes
- Country: United States
- Language: English

Maraschino Cherry is an American hardcore pornographic film and comedy released in 1978. The film was directed by Radley Metzger (as "Henry Paris") and filmed in several locations in New York City; it was his fifth and final hardcore film.

== Plot ==
Maraschino Cherry (Gloria Leonard), the owner of a high-class escort service in New York City, teaches her younger sister, Penny Cherry (Jenny Baxter), about the business. The two sisters reflect on a series of erotic episodes related to the service and its clients, replete with humorous puns and innuendos.

== Cast ==
- Gloria Leonard as Maraschino "Mara" Cherry
- Jenny Baxter as Penny Cherry, Maraschino Cherry's younger sister
- Lesllie Bovee as Maraschino's personal assistant
- Annette Haven as the Piano Bar Girl
- C. J. Laing as a Slave
- Constance Money as an Escort
- Eric Edwards as a Client
- Michael Gaunt as a Client
- Susan McBain as an Escort
- Wade Nichols as a Boyfriend

== Background ==
Maraschino Cherry was released during the Golden Age of Porn (inaugurated by the 1969 release of Andy Warhol's Blue Movie) in the United States, at a time of "porno chic", in which adult erotic films were just beginning to be widely released, publicly discussed by celebrities (like Johnny Carson and Bob Hope) and taken seriously by film critics (like Roger Ebert).

== Reception ==
One film reviewer notes that "[Maraschino Cherry] may not be [Metzger's] finest moment", but that it is "... still a beautifully shot film ... the dialogue is well written, the humor genuinely funny ...". Another reviewer writes, "Most of Metzger’s films are known for their offbeat humor and witty dialog. Maraschino Cherry is filled [with] many amusing comedy set pieces ...".

== Notes ==
According to one film reviewer, Radley Metzger's films, including those made during the Golden Age of Porn (1969–1984), are noted for their "lavish design, witty screenplays, and a penchant for the unusual camera angle". Another reviewer noted that his films were "highly artistic — and often cerebral ... and often featured gorgeous cinematography". Film and audio works by Metzger have been added to the permanent collection of the Museum of Modern Art (MoMA) in New York City.

== Remastered version ==
In 2009, DistribPix released a complete remastering of the film, with the full cooperation of the director. The result had a limited exhibition in theaters, but the main outcome of the project was the first-ever official remastered DVD version. A listing of the music on the film soundtrack was released earlier.

== Music soundtrack ==
No.	Title	Artist	Length
1.	"A Man Alone"	Alan Hawkshaw	4:23
2.	"Disco King"	Keith Mansfield	3:01
3.	"Get Ready, Get Set, Fly!"	Alan Hawkshaw	1:58
4.	"Hombre Solo"	Simon Munting	2:08
5.	"Man Of Means"	Alan Hawkshaw	3:16

No.	Title	Artist	Length
6.	"Midnight Blue"	Simon Benson	3:17
7.	"Night Drive"	Simon Benson	3:00
8.	"Private Thoughts"	Steve Gray	2:16
9.	"Take It Steady"	Brian Bennett	2:18
10.	"Theme Maraschino Cherry"	Nick Ingman	1:59

== See also ==
- Andy Warhol filmography
- Erotic art
- Erotic films in the United States
- Erotic photography
- Golden Age of Porn
- List of American films of 1978
- Sex in film
- Unsimulated sex
