= Zebedy Colt =

American actor (1929–2004)

- Born: Edward Earle Marsh; December 20, 1929; California, United States
- Died: May 29, 2004 (aged 74); United States
- Occupations: Film director, actor, singer

Edward Earle Marsh (December 20, 1929 – May 29, 2004) was an American actor, musician, adult film director and star. He is principally known by his stage name Zebedy Colt.

== Early years ==
Born in California, Marsh began his career as a child actor in Hollywood, appearing uncredited as one of the Three Little Pigs in the 1934 Laurel and Hardy classic Babes in Toyland. Another uncredited film appearance, recalled anecdotally in his Las Vegas home a year before his death, was as a child in The Adventures of Robin Hood, with Errol Flynn.

In the late 1960s he became an innovator of 'queer cabaret' when he recorded the early gay album I’ll Sing for You with the London Philharmonic Orchestra. This was the first time he used the Zebedy Colt name. Controversial in its day, the album consisted of original gay-themed compositions (credited to his real name) or songs originally meant to be sung by women (among them George Gershwin’s "The Man I Love") but given a homosexual twist by being covered by a man.

In November 1969 Marsh wrote a letter to Time magazine, using his Zebedy Colt pseudonym and Stockton, New Jersey address, in response to an article published in its 31 October edition entitled 'Behavior: A Discussion: Are Homosexuals Sick?', in which he argued that gays were then "becoming more and more a part of the mainstream."

== Career ==
On Broadway, he used the name Edward Earle and served as Anthony Newley’s understudy in The Roar of the Greasepaint - The Smell of the Crowd, as well as performing in The Royal Family, The Dark at the Top of the Stairs and an award-winning 1976 production of Tom Stoppard's Travesties. He was also known in New Jersey and Pennsylvania for directing and performing in regional and community theater productions.

Marsh entered the pornographic film world in middle age, primarily as a means of financially supporting himself. He chose to resurrect the Zebedy Colt name from his I’ll Sing for You album for his porn work, both to conceal his true identity and as a way of separating it from his Broadway career. On more than one occasion, however, Marsh's double life was uncovered. When the Broadway company he was with went to see The Story of Joanna, they were surprised to see their co-star playing a bisexual butler. Marsh later recalled one of them telling him, "Darling, you can be my butler anytime." A similar situation occurred when Marsh was appearing in an off-Broadway play with Sandy Dennis. Dennis thought she recognized Marsh from an adult film she'd been to see with her mother, and was delighted to have this confirmed when she asked him "Are you Zebedy Colt?"

His films as a director include Farmer's Daughters (1976, starring the young Spalding Gray), White Fire (1976, as 'Roger Colmont'), the sadistic The Devil Inside Her (1977, shot at Marsh's home in Lambertville, New Jersey), Unwilling Lovers (1977) and Terri's Revenge (1977). As an actor in adult films, he starred in such pictures as Radley Metzger's Barbara Broadcast, Gerard Damiano's The Story of Joanna, Manhold (a 3D film) and the Death Wish porn rip-off Sex Wish.

Marsh retired from adult films in the early 1980s, due to concerns over the criminal element in the industry (citing the murder of Dutch businessman Navred Reef, who directed him in the film Sharon) and the drop in quality due to the change from film to video. He spent his final years in Las Vegas, entertaining friends and neighbors with scrapbooks that documented his long career.
