= Barbara Broadcast =

1977 film by Radley Metzger

- DVD cover
- Directed by: Radley Metzger (as "Henry Paris")
- Written by: Radley Metzger (as "Jake Barnes")
- Produced by: Ava Leighton
- Starring: Annette Haven; Bobby Astyr; C. J. Laing; Constance Money; Jamie Gillis; Michael Gaunt; Sharon Mitchell; Suzanne McBain; Wade Nichols; Zebedy Colt
- Cinematography: Chico Carter; Larry Revene (uncredited)
- Edited by: Gene Perry
- Music by: various (uncredited)
- Distributed by: Audubon Films (USA); VCA Pictures (USA); Distribpix (USA)
- Release date: October 27, 1977
- Running time: 82 minutes
- Country: United States
- Language: English

Barbara Broadcast is an American adult erotic film released in 1977. The film was directed by Radley Metzger (as "Henry Paris") and filmed in several elaborate locations in New York City, including the Olympia ballroom and restaurant in the Royal Manhattan Hotel.

== Plot ==
Barbara Broadcast, a world-famous liberated woman and best-selling author, is interviewed by a journalist about her successful career in an elegant Manhattan hotel restaurant, where gourmet food and erotic activities are on the menu: a surrealistic "Buñuelian" atmosphere, according to one film reviewer. Afterwards, other Manhattan moments in New York City are featured, including a corporate office encounter and a casual meeting in a busy night club.

== Cast ==
- Annette Haven as Barbara Broadcast
- Bobby Astyr as the Maitre d'
- C. J. Laing as Roberta, the interviewer
- Constance Money as a Slave
- Jamie Gillis as Curley
- Michael Gaunt as a Client
- Sharon Mitchell as a Waitress
- Susan McBain as a Diner
- Wade Nichols as a Cook
- Zebedy Colt as a Diner

== Reception ==
According to an X-Critic film reviewer, Barbara Broadcast is "... a playful, funny and beautifully made film for grownups, a celebration of carnality and earthly delights shot with an artist’s eye for composition and set to an excellent [music] score ...". Barbara Broadcast, according to another reviewer, "... is a fun, witty, and charming film ...". Another reviewer notes, " ... [the film has] plenty of electric atmosphere and [music] ... This is porno chic! ..." Paracinema film critic Heather Drain writes, "Metzger’s work is known for its eye candy and this film is no exception, with every frame looking like a perfectly composed piece of art ... Barbara Broadcast may not be heavy on plot, but is an exquisitely crafted film from one of the best American directors to have emerged [since the 1970s] ... Radley Metzger is truly one of a kind."

== History ==
Barbara Broadcast was released during the Golden Age of Porn (inaugurated by the 1969 release of Andy Warhol's Blue Movie) in the United States, at a time of "porno chic", in which adult erotic films were just beginning to be widely released, publicly discussed by celebrities (like Johnny Carson and Bob Hope) and taken seriously by film critics (like Roger Ebert).

== Notes ==
According to one film reviewer, Radley Metzger's films, including those made during the Golden Age of Porn (1969–1984), are noted for their "lavish design, witty screenplays, and a penchant for the unusual camera angle". Another reviewer noted that his films were "highly artistic — and often cerebral ... and often featured gorgeous cinematography". Film and audio works by Metzger have been added to the permanent collection of the Museum of Modern Art (MoMA) in New York City.

== Restoration ==
On July 4, 2013, DistribPix released a restoration of the film, with the cooperation of the director. The result had a limited exhibition in theaters, but the main outcome of the project was the first official DVD and Blu-ray versions. A listing of the music on the film soundtrack was released earlier.

== Awards ==
- Winner 1989 – Member of XRCO Hall of Fame.
- Nominee 2014 – AVN Award (Best DVD Extras).
- Winner 2015 – X-Rated: Greatest Adult Movies of All Time.

== Music soundtrack ==
No.	Title	Artist	Length
1.	"Azure Blue"	Simon Benson	3:50
2.	"Before Summer Ends"	Keith Mansfield	3:51
3.	"Big Haul"	Brian Bennett	2:52
4.	"Dossier"	Brian Bennett	2:42
5.	"Flying High"	Stefano Torossi	3:36
6.	"Getaway"	Alan Hawkshaw	2:37
7.	"Glittering Mud"	Steve Gray	3:54
8.	"Merry Go Round"	Alan Hawkshaw	2:05

No.	Title	Artist	Length
9.	"Reflections Misty Morning"	Brian Bennett	3:40
10.	"Tales from Vienna Woods"	Johann Strauss II	10:54
11.	"The Big One"	Alan Tew	4:05
12.	"The Blue Danube Waltz"	Johann Strauss II	10:33
13.	"The Double Take"	Steve Gray	3:47
14.	"Wallop"	Brian Bennett	3:25
15.	"White Elephant Walk"	Alan Tew	1:30
16.	"You've Got What It Takes"	Madeline Bell	3:39

== See also ==
- Andy Warhol filmography
- Erotic art
- Erotic films in the United States
- Erotic photography
- Golden Age of Porn
- List of American films of 1977
- Sex in film
- Unsimulated sex
