= Constance Money =

American pornographic actress (born 1956)

- Born: Susan Jensen; November 30, 1956 (age 69); Lebanon, Pennsylvania, U.S.
- Other names: Jennifer Baker; Christina Hoover
- Occupation: Adult film actress

Constance Money (born Susan Jensen; November 30, 1956) is an American former adult film actress. She played the lead role of Misty Beethoven in the 1976 adult classic The Opening of Misty Beethoven.

== Early life and education ==
Susan Jensen was born in Kenmore, Washington, where she was a cheerleader and acted at Inglemoor High School; she studied psychology and sociology at Mills College in Oakland, California.

== Adult film career ==
After first appearing in pornographic films while in college, under the name Jennifer Baker, as Constance Money she played the lead role of the lowly Parisian prostitute reshaped by a sexologist to reach the top tier of her profession in Henry Paris (Radley Metzger)'s 1976 pornographic parody of Shaw's Pygmalion, The Opening of Misty Beethoven. She later said in an interview that she had expected it to be an R-rated movie and that the film reflected her actual sexual education during production: "Misty is a good movie because it is real."

Following the film's success, she made several appearances as a porn star, including stays at the Playboy Mansion, and appeared in Playboy magazine in July 1977 in a photo feature on "The New Girls of Porn" and a 1978 personal photo spread, titled "Call of the Wild", which portrayed her as leading a double life starring in adult films and running a hostelry in a remote part of Alaska. Her subsequent appearances include Mary! Mary! and Obsessed (both 1977), and Taste of Money (1983), her last pornographic film, which is about her return to porn after a hiatus. Her co-star was frequently John Leslie, a friend with whom she lived for a while.

During shooting of Misty Beethoven, Jensen had objected to work she considered in excess of her contract and claimed damages for stolen possessions; she subsequently sued Metzger over his reuse of material shot for that film, particularly in Barbara Broadcast and Maraschino Cherry. The parties settled out of court in 1979. It has been reported that Metzger gave her the alias Constance Money because of her demands for money, but Metzger denied it.

She was inducted into the AVN Hall of Fame in 1998 and into the XRCO Hall of Fame as a film pioneer in 2016.

== Subsequent career ==
Encouraged by Hugh Hefner to try to cross over into mainstream film, she had a small part in Blake Edwards' 1979 film 10 and unsuccessfully sought the lead role in Frances (1982); the producers were unwilling to consider a star with a background in pornography. She retired from acting to the Pacific Northwest.
