= Toni Bentley =

Australian-German dancer and writer (born 1958)

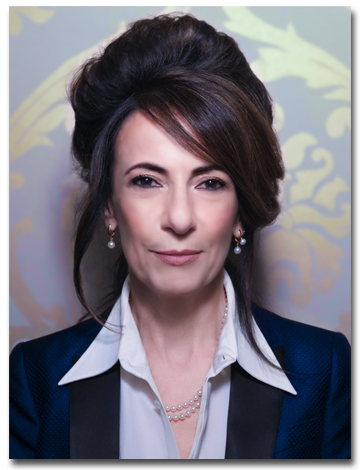
- Born: 1958 (age 67–68); Perth, Western Australia
- Occupation: Writer
- Writing career
- Period: 1982–present
- Genre: Non-fiction
- Notable awards: Guggenheim Fellowship

Toni Bentley (born 1958) is an Australian-German dancer and writer. Bentley was born in Perth, Western Australia.

== Family and early life ==
Bentley's father, P. J. Bentley, is an Australian biologist and endocrinologist. Her brother, Dr. David Bentley, is a molecular biologist at the University of Colorado Denver. She took her first ballet class at age four in Bristol, England, and entered the School of American Ballet, the official school of New York City Ballet, at age ten. At age seventeen she joined George Balanchine's New York City Ballet where she performed for ten years under his tutelage. She retired from the stage at age 26 owing to a hip injury.

== Career ==
Bentley has written five books. Winter Season, A Dancer's Journal, was published when she was 22 years old by Random House. It is a diary of her life as a corps-de-ballet dancer in the New York City Ballet. It was called "a mini-marvel" by Robert Craft in The New York Review of Books. Her other books include Holding On to the Air: the Autobiography of Suzanne Farrell (co-authored with Farrell, Simon & Schuster, 1990); Costumes by Karinska (Harry N. Abrams, 1995) about Russian costume designer Barbara Karinska; Sisters of Salome (Yale University Press, 2002), a cultural history of the femme fatale and origins of modern striptease; and The Surrender, An Erotic Memoir (ReganBooks/HarperCollins, 2004). All of her books have been named as Notable Books of the Year by The New York Times. She has written essays and reviews for The New York Times Book Review, Vogue, The New Republic, Bookforum, and CR Fashionbook. Her essay "The Bad Lion", originally published in The New York Review of Books, was selected for The Best American Essays (2010) by editor Christopher Hitchens.

She has given lectures at Harvard University, the Oscar Wilde Society, the Philadelphia Museum of Art, the Zimmerli Art Museum at Rutgers University, the University of North Florida, the Philoctetes Society, and at THiNK 2013. In 2008 she was awarded a Guggenheim Fellowship.

=== The Surrender ===
HarperCollins published Bentley's book The Surrender (2004), a memoir of her experiences with heterosexual sodomy and a celebration of female sexual submission. At the time the book caused Bentley considerable notoriety given her perceived status as part of cultured society and the taboo nature of the subject matter. The subject has since received considerable mainstream attention because of the worldwide profile gained by Fifty Shades of Grey. The book has been translated into eighteen languages. A one-woman play adaptation of The Surrender, La Rendición directed by Spanish film director Sigfrid Monleón adapted by Swiss-German actress Isabelle Stoffel had its premiere in Spanish in Madrid at the Microteatro Por Dinero in January 2012. Stoffel starred in the production. It was subsequently produced by the Spanish National Theatre (Centro Dramático Nacional) in January 2013 at the Teatro María Guerrero in Madrid. The play had its English-language world premiere at the Edinburgh Festival Fringe in August 2013, and had its American premiere at the Clurman Theatre in New York City in January 2014. It has also been performed in Buenos Aires, Barcelona, Valencia, and in a German-language version, Die Hingabe in Kiel, Germany, and Bern, Switzerland.

== Selected works ==
=== Books ===
- Winter Season: A Dancer's Journal (Random House, 1982)
- Holding On to the Air (Simon & Schuster, 1990)
- Costumes by Karinska (Harry N. Abrams, 1995)
- Sisters of Salome (Yale University Press, 2002)
- The Surrender: An Erotic Memoir (Ecco/HarperCollins, 2004)
- Serenade: A Balanchine Story (Pantheon Books, 2022)

=== Anthologies ===
- Remembering Lincoln (editor Nancy Reynolds, The Ballet Society, 2007)
- Reading Dance (editor Robert Gottlieb, Pantheon Books, 2008)
- Dirty Words, A Literary Encyclopedia of Sex (editor Ellen Sussman, Bloomsbury, 2008)
- Best American Essays 2010 (editor Christopher Hitchens, Houghton Mifflin Harcourt, 2010)
- New York Diaries 1609–2009 (editor Teresa Carpenter, Modern Library, 2012)

=== Reviews ===
- Upstairs, Downstairs: 'Vagina: A New Biography', by Naomi Wolf
- Vita and Violet: The Greatest Bloomsbury Love Story: 'A Book of Secrets' by Michael Holroyd
- Taking Flight: 'Apollo's Angels, A History of Ballet' by Jennifer Homans
- Meet, Pay, Love: 'Hos, Hookers, Call Girls, and Rent Boys' edited by David Henry Sterry and R. J. Martin Jr
- Appraising Grace: 'Ballet's Magic Kingdom' by Akim Volynsky. Edited and translated by Stanley J. Rabinowitz
- Bentley, Toni (29 May 2005). "'Vindication': Mary Wollstonecraft's Sense and Sensibility". The New York Times.
- Two-Step: ‘The Astaires' by Kathleen Riley
- Faithless Love: 'Jealousy' by Catherine Millet Translated by Helen Stevenson
- Casanova, The Man Who Loved Women: 'Casanova' by Ian Kelly
- The Brando of Ballet: 'Nureyev' by Julie Kavanagh
- Life, and My Evil Ex-Boyfriend: 'Learning to Drive' by Katha Pollitt
- Nip and Tuck: 'Beauty Junkies' by Alex Kuczynski
- The Master: 'George Balanchine: The Ballet Maker' by Robert Gottlieb, 'All in the Dances: A Brief Life of George Balanchine' by Terry Teachout
- 'Margot Fonteyn': Leaping Beauty by Meredith Daneman
- The Rage of Joe: Lars von Trier’s 'Nymphomaniac' and the Female Scream by Lars von Trier
- 'Zumanity' heralds a burlesque revival
- A Picture of Passion: 'The Company' by Robert Altman
- Shutters and Shudders: 'Lee Miller, A Life' by Carolyn Burke
- The Girl Can't Help It: 'The Female Thing' by Laura Kipnis
- Bound for Glory: 'Writer of O' by Pola Rapaport
- Sex and the 'Girls' Woman: Lena Dunham
- Butchery at the Ballet: 'Black Swan'
- I Feel Bad About My Neck: And Other Thoughts on Being a Woman by Nora Ephron

=== Essays ===
- The Ghost Hovering Over ‘Giselle’
- Related, by Devotion, to Balanchine
- Dancers: The Agony And The Ecstasy
- Reaching For Perfection – The Life And Death of a Dancer
- The Bad Lion
- A Ballerina, Inside Out
- Boxers and Ballerinas
- The Ballet That Changed Everything
- Darci Kistler Exits the Stage
- A Chart-Topping Cave Dweller
- The Thin End of the Whip
- The Legend of Henry Paris
- Critic's Argument for Heftier Dancers Is Thin
- The Vagina Fallacy
