= Jamie Gillis =

American pornographic actor & director (1943–2010)

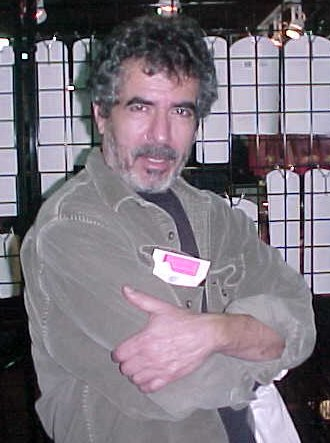
- Gillis at the CES in Las Vegas, 1999
- Born: Jamey Ira Gurman; April 20, 1943; New York City, U.S.
- Died: February 19, 2010 (aged 66); New York City, U.S.
- Other names: Al Cianelli, Jamie Kantor, Jamier Kantor, Jaime Gillis, Jaimie Gillis, Jaimi Gillis, Jamey Gillis, Jamie Grill, Buster Hymen, Jamey, James Kleeman, Cotton Mathers, Ronny Morgan, Barry Gillis, Sir Jamie Gillis, James Rugman (gay)
- Partner(s): Serena, Zarela Martinez, Juliet Graham

Jamie Gillis (born Jamey Ira Gurman; April 20, 1943 – February 19, 2010) was an American pornographic actor, director and member of the AVN Hall of Fame. He was married to the porn actress Serena.

== Early life ==
Gillis was born Jamey Ira Gurman in New York City. He was named after the Tyrone Power character in the film The Black Swan (1942), and he took the name Gillis from the girlfriend he was living with when he made his first films. Gillis later attended Columbia University and graduated magna cum laude. While supporting himself driving a cab, he answered an ad in The Village Voice.

== Career ==
He appeared in more than 470 movies as an actor. He also directed several adult movies. While appearing mostly in heterosexual pornography, Gillis was bisexual and occasionally performed in gay porn, including a sex scene with Zebedy Colt in the 1975 Gerard Damiano BDSM-themed film The Story of Joanna. Gillis appeared in the mainstream Hollywood film Nighthawks (1981) as the boss of Lindsay Wagner's character (he's credited as 'Designer'). He also made his name in two Radley Metzger films, The Opening of Misty Beethoven (1976) and Barbara Broadcast (1977); the former is considered by author Toni Bentley to be the "crown jewel" of the Golden Age of Porn.

According to Al Goldstein, Gillis was always described as "sexually the wildest, most decadent, off-the-wall guy in the business." He was a pioneer in the pornographic style known as Gonzo. In addition to starring in the first Buttman film, he also created the influential On the Prowl series. Featuring a porn star who rides in a limo looking for regular guys to have sex with, the video series was very popular and inspired a scene in the movie Boogie Nights. He also co-produced the popular Dirty Debutante series with fellow director and performer Ed Powers. In the early 1990s, he directed a series of low-budget videos called Jamie Gillis: The Private Tapes, meant for a niche market and sometimes for private customers, which focused on fetish themes such as BDSM but also on some occasions golden showers and coprophilia.

== Death ==
Gillis died on February 19, 2010, in New York City from melanoma, which was diagnosed four to five months earlier. In an audio interview given to The Rialto Report shortly before his death, Gillis stated that in the 1970s he had wanted his ashes to be scattered in Times Square, but years later he changed his mind, stating that the cleaned up Times Square that emerged in the 1990s would contaminate his ashes.

== Partial filmography ==
=== As an actor ===
- Die You Zombie Bastards! (2005)
- Potty Mouth (2004)
- Luv Generation (2004)
- Sunset Stripped (2002)
- New Wave Hookers 5 (1997)
- Bobby Sox (1996)
- Taboo XI (1993)
- Taboo IX (1991)
- Play My Flute (1991)
- Uncle Jamie's Double Trouble (1991)
- Playin' Dirty (1990)
- Jamie Gillis and Africa (1990)
- Taboo VII (1989)
- Alien Space Avenger (1989)
- Adventures of Buttman (1989)
- Pretty Peaches (1989)
- Head Lock (1989)
- Pretty Peaches 2 (1987)
- Babyface 2 (1986)
- Taboo V (1986)
- Taboo IV (1985)
- Ten Little Maidens (1985)
- Love Mexican Style (1985)
- Too Naughty to Say No (1985)
- New Wave Hookers (1984)
- Trinity Brown (1984)
- A Little Bit of Hanky Panky (1984)
- Corruption (1983)
- Night of the Zombies (1981)
- Roommates (1981)
- Neon Nights (1981)
- Amanda by Night (1981)
- Wanda Whips Wall Street (1981)
- Nighthawks (1981)
- Blonde Ambition (1981)
- Dracula Exotica (1980)
- The Seduction of Cindy (1980)
- 800 Fantasy Lane (1979)
- The Ecstasy Girls (1979)
- Sensual Fire (1979)
- Heavenly Desire (1979)
- Hot Honey (1978)
- Dracula Sucks (aka Lust At First Bite) (1978)
- A Coming of Angels (1977)
- Barbara Broadcast (1977)
- Lustful Feelings (1977)
- Obsessed (1977)
- Captain Lust and the Pirate Women (1977)
- Through the Looking Glass (1976)
- Winter Heat (1976)
- Water Power (1976)
- The Opening of Misty Beethoven (1976)
- Oriental Blue (1976)
- Saturday Night Special (1976)
- Boy 'Napped (1975)
- Sometime Sweet Susan (1975)
- Abigail Lesley is Back in Town(1975)
- The Seduction of Lyn Carter (1974)
- Fantasy Girls (1974)
- Deep Throat Part II (1974)

=== As a director ===
- Devious Old Gillis (1998)
- Back on the Prowl 2 (1998)
- Back on the Prowl (1998)
- Punished Sex Offenders (1990)
- Takeout Torture (1990)
- On the Prowl (1989)

== Awards ==
- 1976 AFAA Award – Best Actor (The Opening of Misty Beethoven)
- 1977 AAFA Award – Best Actor (Coming of Angels)
- 1979 AAFA Award – Best Actor (Ecstasy Girls)
- 1982 AFAA Award – Best Supporting Actor (Roommates)
- 1984 XRCO Award – Best Kinky Scene (Insatiable II)
- 1985 XRCO Award – Best Kinky Scene (Nasty)
- 1987 XRCO Award – Best Actor (Deep Throat 2)
- 1987 XRCO Award – Best Supporting Actor (Babyface 2)
- 1987 XRCO Award – Best Kinky Scene (Let's Get It On With Amber Lynn)
- 1989 AVN Award – Best Supporting Actor – (Pretty Peaches 2)
- 1989 XRCO Award – Best Actor (Second Skin)
- 1997 AVN Award – Best Actor – Film (Bobby Sox)
- 1999 AVN Award – Best Supporting Actor – Video (Forever Night)
- AVN Hall of Fame
- XRCO Hall of Fame

== See also ==
- Golden Age of Porn
- List of male performers in gay porn films

== Sources ==
- Nicolas Barbano: Verdens 25 hotteste pornostjerner (Rosinante, Denmark 1999) ISBN 87-7357-961-0: Features a chapter on him.
- The Rialto Report: Jamie Gillis: New York Beginnings, audio interview with Jamie Gillis, November 17, 2013
- Sloan, Will (November 21, 2013). "The Godfather of Gonzo Porn". Hazlitt. Random House of Canada.
