= Bobby Astyr =

American pornographic actor

- Born: November 14, 1937; New York, U.S.
- Died: April 7, 2002 (aged 64); Manhattan, New York, U.S.
- Occupation: Pornographic film actor
- Partner: Samantha Fox (1978–2002; his death)

Bobby Astyr (November 14, 1937 – April 7, 2002) was an American pornographic film actor.

Prior to becoming involved in pornography, Astyr was a musician. He made his debut in porn in 1974 and appeared in many films, including Barbara Broadcast in 1977, where he performed as the Maitre d' in an elegant New York City hotel restaurant. Usually cast in comedic roles, he was dubbed "The Clown Prince of Porno". Astyr retired in the mid-1980s. He often performed with Samantha Fox, with whom he was in a long-term relationship. Later in his life, Astyr served on the board of directors of a housing project in New York's East Village. After battling lung cancer on and off for five or six years, Astyr died in April 2002.

== Awards ==
- 1979 AFAA Best Supporting Actor for People
- 1999 XRCO Hall of Fame inductee
