= Resurrection of Eve =

- Film poster
- Directed by: Jon Fontana & Artie Mitchell
- Written by: Jon Fontana; Artie Mitchell
- Produced by: Alex R. Benton; Artie Mitchell & Jim Mitchell
- Starring: Marilyn Chambers
- Cinematography: Jon Fontana
- Edited by: Mark Bradford; Jon Fontana
- Music by: Richard D.F. Wynkoop
- Distributed by: Mitchell Brothers Film Group
- Release date: September 13, 1973
- Running time: 85 minutes
- Country: United States
- Language: English

Resurrection of Eve is a 1973 American feature-length pornographic film produced by the Mitchell brothers and starring Marilyn Chambers, who had become a star in the Mitchell Brothers' previous picture, Behind the Green Door. Resurrection of Eve was directed and written by Jon Fontana and Artie Mitchell. Though less successful commercially and critically than Behind the Green Door, it is considered one of the films of The Golden Age of Porn. Like Behind the Green Door, it featured interracial sex, including a reprise of Chambers' coupling with her Green Door co-star Johnnie Keyes, but broke new ground in a film targeting a heterosexual audience by included shots of gay fellatio.

== Plot ==
Eve, a victim of childhood sexual abuse, and her lover Frank, a disc jockey, live in the San Francisco Bay Area. They have a fight triggered by Frank's jealous nature. Frank is dismayed that Eve has gone to a boxing match featuring African American pugilist Johnnie Keyes. Eve tries to console Frank with sex, but they fight and he tells her, “Perhaps you need some of that black stuff.” Eve leaves the house, gets into her car, and has a terrible accident whilst driving, winding up in the hospital, wrapped in bandages. After the bandages are taken off, she surprisingly is much prettier. This is her first resurrection.

After Eve returns home, Frank suggests they attend a swinger's party, and she reluctantly agrees. At the ensuing orgy, Frank happily enjoys the charms of a friend's wife, but Eve is horrified by the hedonism and they fight afterwards. Frank berates her for harboring sexual inhibitions and blamed for trying to make him feel guilty. The brow-beaten Eve decides to try swinging again.

After attending a couple more swing parties, a role-reversal begins to take place. Eve becomes an enthusiastic swinger, and Frank's jealousy comes out at a party in a 1950s themed party in which he sees his wife fellating an African American. Frank becomes the reticent partner as Eve becomes unfettered sexuality, and he loses his control over her. At an orgy featuring all manners of sex, gay, straight and interracial, Eve couples with an African American gentleman while the jealous Frank watches. She announces after coitus that she is leaving Frank. The second resurrection of Eve is complete.

== Themes ==
Resurrection of Eve has a more detailed plot than is normal for the era. The film touches on issues of sexual politics and race-based sexual envy. There is less sex than would be expected from the Mitchell Brothers, after viewing Behind the Green Door, a basically plotless sextravaganza.

The Supreme Court's 1973 Miller v. California decision, which was decided on 21 June 1973, adversely affected the mainstream release of porn films, including Behind the Green Door. The Miller decision redefined obscenity from that of “utterly without socially redeeming value” to that that lacks "serious literary, artistic, political, or scientific value" and substituted contemporary community standards for national standards, as some prior tests required. Miller continued to hold that obscenity was not protected by the First Amendment, which gave leeway to local judges to seize and destroy prints of films adjudged to violate local community standards.

When Behind the Green Door opened in Suffolk County, New York in 1973, it was successfully prosecuted, as it was in New York City along with the 1973 porn film The New Comers. In addition to New York, Behind the Green Door was banned in California, Colorado, and Georgia. Resurrection of Eve, which was released in the United States on 13 September 1973,

== See also ==
- List of American films of 1973

== Sources ==
- Michelson, Peter (1993). Speaking the unspeakable: a poetics of obscenity. SUNY Press. ISBN 0-7914-1223-7.
- Williams, Linda (2004). Porn studies. Duke University Press. ISBN 0-8223-3312-0.
