= Behind the Green Door: the Sequel =

1986 film by Mitchell brothers

Behind the Green Door: The Sequel
- Videotape box cover
- Directed by: Artie Mitchell; Sharon McNight
- Written by: Sharon McNight; Artie Mitchell
- Produced by: Jim Mitchell
- Starring: Missy Manners
- Cinematography: Jon Fontana
- Edited by: Lawrence Legume
- Distributed by: Mitchell Brothers Pictures
- Release date: 1986
- Running time: 90 minutes
- Country: United States
- Language: English

Behind the Green Door: the Sequel is a 1986 American pornographic film and the sequel to Behind the Green Door. It was produced by the Mitchell brothers and starred Missy Manners. It had a "safe sex" theme as a response to the AIDS crisis. Hence, all sexual contact between performers featured the use of condoms, dental dams and medical exam gloves.

== Plot ==
At a 1980s safe sex themed sex club in San Francisco, Gloria, a beautiful young woman, experiences several safe sexual adventures.

== Cast ==
- Missy Manners ... Gloria
- James Martin ... Barry
- Lulu Reed ... Flight Attendant / Maenad
- Marie ... Flight Attendant / Maenad
- Fallon ... Flight Attendant / Maenad
- Candi ... Flight Attendant / Maenad
- Friday Jones ... Co-pilot / Maenad
- Aubec Kane ... Pilot / Herm 1
- Andrew Young ... Captain / Pan
- Ja Kinncaide ... Trapeze 2
- Lane Ross ... Trapeze 3
- Tony Cargo ... Herm 2
- Brock Roland ... Club / Apartment Doorman
- Squirt ... Club Host
- Claudine Wims ... Waitress
- D.W. Wachnight ... Bartender
- Sharon McNight ... Wanda / Club Singer
- Pepper ... Woman with Dog
- Bobby Mack ... Limo Driver
- Wallace Barry ... Notetaker
- Yank Levine ... Barry's Friend
- Ron James ... Naked Man with Water
- Jeff Larson ... Lorry Driver
- Erica Idol ... Bride / Airport
- Tau Stephenson ... Groom / Airport
- Rita Ricardo ... Lady in Red Gown
- Noel Juar ... Tattooed Lady
- Wednesday Will ... Slow Dancer 1
- Sixten Bjorline ... Slow Dancer 2
- Jackie ... Lady in Leopard Costume
- Susie Bright ... Club Patron
- Lola Carter ... Airline Passenger
- Jane Castellon ... Airline Passenger
- Danny Daniels
- Rocky Gieger ... Airline Passenger
- Debi Sundahl ... Club Patron
- Jack Wrangler
- Marilyn Chambers ... Gloria Saunders (archive footage, uncredited)

== Production ==
Missy Manners, née Elisa Florez was formerly a United States Senate Page, receptionist for Utah Republican Senator Orrin Hatch, and daughter of the Undersecretary of Education during the administration of George H. W. Bush.

Though Manners was in a relationship with producer Artie Mitchell, she maintains that she auditioned for the lead role in the film, a claim which many who were significantly involved in the project disputed. Her links to Republican party officials were emphasized in publicity for the film in much the same fashion as her predecessor, Marilyn Chambers, having modeled for Ivory Snow.

== Reception ==
Behind the Green Door: The Sequel was a critical and commercial disaster; Jim and Artie Mitchell ended up losing hundreds of thousands of dollars in that venture.
