= Rated X (film) =

2000 Showtime television

- Unrated DVD cover
- Genre: Biographical; Drama
- Based on: X-Rated by David McCumber
- Screenplay by: David Hollander; Norman Snider
- Directed by: Emilio Estevez
- Starring: Charlie Sheen; Emilio Estevez
- Theme music composer: Tyler Bates
- Country of origin: United States
- Original language: English

Production
- Producer: Allan Marcil
- Cinematography: Paul Sarossy
- Editor: Craig Bassett
- Running time: 115 minutes
- Production company: District

Original release
- Network: Showtime
- Release: January 25, 2000

Rated X is a 2000 American television film starring brothers Charlie Sheen and Emilio Estevez, with the latter also directing. Based on the nonfiction book X-Rated by David McCumber, the film chronicles the story of the Mitchell brothers, Jim and Artie, who were pioneers in the pornography and strip club businesses in San Francisco in the 1970s and 1980s. The film focuses on the making of their most profitable film, Behind the Green Door. It also portrays Artie's descent into drug addiction.

== Cast ==
- Charlie Sheen as Artie Jay Mitchell
  - Robert Clark as Teenage Artie Mitchell
- Emilio Estevez as James Lloyd "Jim" Mitchell
  - Taylor Estevez as Teenage Jim Mitchell
- Geoffrey Blake as Michael Kennedy
- Rafer Weigel as Lionel
- Tracy Hutson as Marilyn Chambers
- Royce Hercules as Johnnie Keyes
- Megan Ward as Meredith Bradford
- Danielle Brett as Adrienne
- Terry O'Quinn as J.R. Mitchell
- Nicole de Boer as Karen Mitchell
- Deborah Grover as Georgia Mae Mitchell
- Kim Poirier as Jamie, The Actress

== Production ==
The film was shot in Hamilton, Ontario, and Toronto, Ontario.

== Release ==
Rated X was first screened at the 2000 Sundance Film Festival on January 25, 2000 before making its network debut on May 13.

== Reception ==
Rated X received mixed-to-negative critical reviews. The film holds a 33% rating on Rotten Tomatoes based on nine reviews.

== Bibliography ==
- David McCumber (2000). X-Rated. Pinnacle Books. ISBN 9780786011131.
