= Mitchell brothers =

American businessmen in the field of adult entertainment

Brothers James Lloyd Mitchell (November 30, 1943 in Stockton, California – July 12, 2007 in Petaluma, California) and Artie Jay Mitchell (December 17, 1945 in Lodi, California – February 27, 1991 in Marin County, California) were American entrepreneurs. They operated in the pornography and striptease club business in San Francisco and other parts of California from 1969 until 1991 when Jim was convicted of killing Artie.

They opened the O'Farrell Theatre in 1969 as an adult cinema and at one time operated eleven such businesses. They produced and directed many adult films, including Behind the Green Door in 1972. They were also successful as defendants in many obscenity cases. Their notoriety significantly increased with Jim's fratricide and they became the subject of three books, X-Rated, Bottom Feeders, and 9½ Years Behind the Mitchell Brothers' Green Door and the movie Rated X.

== Early life ==
The Mitchells' father Robert (known as Bob), from Oklahoma, was a professional gambler. He and his wife Georgia Mae settled in Antioch, California, near San Francisco. According to the Mitchell brothers' biographers, they had a relatively stable childhood; the boys were popular, and some of their childhood friends became important members of their porn empire. Both attended public schools and graduated from Antioch High School.

Jim, a part-time filmmaking student at San Francisco State University in the mid-1960s, aspired to become an "important" director like Roman Polanski and headed a clique of classmates with similar ambitions. While in school, he worked at the Follies, a cinema showing brief, plotless films featuring naked performers, and observed that each night the theater was filled with masturbators who arrived simply for the onscreen nudity. He therefore perceived pornography as a potentially lucrative career opportunity for himself and Artie, who had been discharged from the United States Army.

== Moviemaking and the O'Farrell Theatre ==
In 1969, with the help of Artie's Ivy League-educated wife Meredith Bradford, the brothers fulfilled their ambitions by leasing and renovating a dilapidated two-story building at 895 O'Farrell Street, which they converted into the O'Farrell Theatre, a movie theater with a makeshift film studio upstairs. They also rented a larger facility at 991 Tennessee Street in which to shoot some of their films; nevertheless, even their fans conceded that the Mitchells' movies ranged in quality from mediocre to atrocious. Jim Mitchell once quipped, "The only Art in [porn] is my brother."

The Mitchells opened the O'Farrell Theatre on July 4, 1969, and were confronted almost immediately by the authorities. They would open other X-rated movie houses in California over the years, spending much time in court and money on lawyers to stay open as the local residents and officials repeatedly tried to shut them down.

They became incorporated as Cinema 7 (headquartered in the managers' offices at the O'Farrell Theatre), and in 1972 produced one of the world's first famous feature-length pornographic movies, Behind the Green Door, starring an unknown Ivory Snow girl Marilyn Chambers in her porn debut. The movie, produced for $60,000, grossed over $25 million.

The Mitchells rode the porno chic wave, using some of their Green Door profits to produce fairly lavish hardcore movies including Resurrection of Eve in 1973, Sodom and Gomorrah: The Last Seven Days in 1975, C.B. Mamas (1976), The Autobiography of a Flea (1976), Never a Tender Moment (1979), and Beyond De Sade (1979).

One of their last big-budget movies was The Grafenberg Spot (1985), featuring Traci Lords, who had entered the adult-video industry underaged using fake identification. The Mitchell brothers were the first to transfer film titles to videotape and market them via ads in national sex magazines. The brothers were inducted into the AVN Hall of Fame.

In 1985, the brothers made the sequel to Behind the Green Door that had been long-awaited—and often postponed. They hired Sharon McNight, a cabaret singer and frequent movie collaborator, to direct the picture and, uncharacteristically, chose to cast the film exclusively with amateur performers. The Mitchell brothers auditioned virtually every newcomer who responded to their advertisements, which appeared in Variety and Bay Area sex tabloids. A handful of O'Farrell dancers accepted small roles; one of them asked to be cast as Gloria, the female lead, reprising the role originally played by Chambers, who did not participate in the sequel. While McNight considered the house dancer for that part, Artie Mitchell's girlfriend, who then called herself Missy Manners, cast herself as Gloria. Filming of the sequel occurred mainly in the O'Farrell Theatre, and took only one day.

Missy, inexperienced at acting and public sex, reportedly had much difficulty performing in front of the film crew; the set was so tense that at one point Jim Mitchell harangued one of his O'Farrell managers in front of everyone because their catered lunch was inadequate. The Green Door sequel was also the world's first safe-sex film, in which all the men wore condoms, and self-protection advice was given to the audience by one of the characters. Highly over-budgeted at $250,000, Behind the Green Door: the Sequel, according to adult magazines, was one of the worst porn pictures ever made, mainly due to the absence of a professional cast.

== Lawsuits ==
In the mid 1970s, low-level organized crime began making unauthorized copies of the Mitchells' movies, and the brothers retaliated in the courts. When one judge ruled that obscene material could not receive copyright protection, the brothers eventually prevailed in the 5th Circuit Court of Appeals, leading to the FBI copyright warnings now found at the start of videos.

The O'Farrell Theatre was frequently raided on obscenity and related charges, leading to over 200 cases against its proprietors. According to Artie's daughter Liberty Bradford Mitchell, the brothers were arrested and jailed more than 180 times each; the family euphemistically referred to those episodes as "business trips". They were defended by attorneys who included Michael Kennedy and civil rights specialist, Joseph Rhine.

== Friends and activities outside of porn ==
The Mitchells were popular on the fringes of San Francisco's diverse society. Their friends included a who's-who of pornography plus San Francisco personalities and celebrities from outside the city: Warren Hinckle, Herb Gold, Aerosmith, Black Panther Huey "Doc" Newton, and Jack Palladino. Palladino would come to be considered the world's most expensive private investigator. The late journalist Hunter S. Thompson was a close friend of the brothers, and frequently visited the O'Farrell Theatre. In 1988, the Mitchells made a 30-minute documentary about him, Hunter S. Thompson: The Crazy Never Die.

Thompson claimed in his 2003 book Kingdom of Fear that he had worked for a while in 1985 as night manager at the club, an assertion repeated by some news articles. Thompson also claimed that the Mitchell brothers smuggled guns to the IRA.

Jim and Artie Mitchell supported various cartoonists, Dan O'Neill among them. During the 1984 Democratic National Convention, they opened the upper floor of the O'Farrell to a group of underground cartoonists, including Victor Moscoso, Robert Crumb, Spain Rodriguez, Ted Richards, S. Clay Wilson, Gary Hallgren and Phil Frank, to cover the convention for the San Francisco Chronicle.

Jim launched the publication War News to protest the first Gulf War; journalist Warren Hinckle was hired as editor, Robert Crumb designed the logo, and Art Spiegelman and Winston Smith were paid contributors. Other contributors included Daniel Ellsberg, Michael Moore, Paul Krassner, Ron Turner, Bob Callahan, Peter Bagge, Jim Woodring, Trina Robbins, S. Clay Wilson, and Hunter S. Thompson. The publication drew little support, and folded shortly after the defeat of Iraq.

== Personal lives ==
Twice-divorced Jim cohabitated for years with Lysa Thatcher (real name Lisa Adams), a pornographic film actress (The Satisfiers of Alpha Blue) and O'Farrell Theatre dancer. He and his second wife Mary Jane had four children and were married for seven years, until 1986; one of them, Meta, was the O'Farrell's general manager.

Artie was the father of six, three with his first wife, Meredith Bradford (who retained her maiden name and insisted that their children go by Bradford), and the others with Karen Hassall, whom he divorced in the mid-1980s. Meredith attended law school at her husband's expense and, upon graduating, represented the Mitchells until Jim fired her over a conflict involving his children's manners at her family's Massachusetts vacation home.

In 2011, Jim's son James "Rafe" Mitchell was convicted of first degree murder for the 2009 death of his ex-girlfriend Danielle Keller in Novato, who was killed with a baseball bat. He was sentenced to 35 years to life for the crime. In May 2014, Artie's daughter Jasmine, was arrested for her alleged participation in an identity theft ring. In his book, Bottom Feeders, John Hubner characterizes the Mitchells as frequently quarreling with each other and everyone else, alternately stingy and profligate, and often misogynistic. In Hubner's book, the O'Farrell Theatre is a mirrored house of sleaze, filled with bikini-clad predators hustling money from men too insecure or ugly to get girls any other way.

== Killing of Artie and trial ==
On February 27, 1991, Jim, in response to demands by friends and associates to "do something" about alcoholic, cocaine-addled Artie, drove to Artie's house in Corte Madera with a .22 rifle that he had inherited from his father. He fatally shot the younger Mitchell three times, in the head, abdomen and right arm. O'Farrell dancer Julie Bajo, who was Artie's lover at the time, was in the house but didn't witness the shooting. She immediately called 911 when she heard shots and the police arrived and arrested Jim minutes later. Marilyn Chambers spoke at Artie's funeral, and he was then buried at Cherokee Memorial Park in Lodi.

After a highly publicized trial in which Jim was represented by an old friend, Michael Kennedy (by then a prominent attorney), the jury rejected a murder charge and found him guilty of voluntary manslaughter. Before Jim's sentencing, numerous people spoke on his behalf (presumably appealing for clemency), including former Mayor Frank Jordan, Sheriff Michael Hennessey and former Police Chief Richard Hongisto. Jim Mitchell was sentenced to six years in prison.

One of the outcomes of Jim's trial was that the California Courts allowed, in a precedent-setting decision, a computer-animation reenactment of the murder to be entered into evidence. The animation was produced by Alexander Jason, a crime scene analyst who had first planned to make a video to show the complex series of events that ended with Artie's fatal shooting. The animation showed the positions of Jim, Artie, the bullet impact points, and the path taken by bullets as they entered Artie's body. This was the first use of a 3D computer animation in a criminal trial. In his final argument before the jury, Michael Kennedy had attempted to mock the virtual reality reenactment. The method's success led to its use in other trials.

== After release from prison ==
After he served three years in San Quentin, Jim was released in 1997 and returned to run the O'Farrell Theatre. Jim established the "Artie Fund" to collect money for a local drug rehabilitation center and for the Surf Rescue Squad of the San Francisco Fire Department. (In 1990, Artie had been caught in a riptide off Ocean Beach in San Francisco, Jim had paddled out to help, and the Surf Rescue Squad had aided in the rescue of both of them; the Mitchells, out of gratitude, issued lifetime O'Farrell passes to the squad members.) Artie's children have denounced the fund, claiming that it is intended to whitewash Artie's murder. On their website, they describe their father's murder as premeditated and motivated by greed and jealousy, and claim that the depictions of Artie in the books and movie are inaccurate. Shortly before his death, Jim wanted to change California's nickname to "the Prison State" and design a license plate saying so. He intended to protest the efforts of law enforcement officers and prison guards to lobby for longer prison sentences.

== Death of Jim ==
Jim Mitchell died at his ranch in Sonoma County, California on July 12, 2007, from an apparent heart attack. The funeral in Jim's boyhood town of Antioch, California on July 19 was attended by around 300 people, including Mayor Willie Brown, former District Attorney Terence Hallinan, and many O'Farrell strippers. He was buried next to his brother.

== In popular culture ==
Biographies of the brothers are X-Rated by David McCumber (1992, ISBN 0-671-75156-5) and Bottom Feeders: From Free Love to Hard Core by John Hubner (1993, ISBN 0-385-42261-X).

In 2000, their story was dramatized in the movie Rated X starring real-life brothers Charlie Sheen and Emilio Estevez as Artie and Jim, with Estevez directing. The film was shot in Toronto, Ontario, although the entire story occurred in the San Francisco Bay Area.

In 2001, the TV series Forensic Files aired an episode titled "Sibling Rivalry", which documented Artie's murder and the use of forensic animation and sound analysis at Jim's trial.

The 2007 book 9½ Years Behind the Green Door (ISBN 1934248622) by Simone Corday describes the brothers from the perspective of a dancer at the O'Farrell who was a girlfriend of Artie.
