= Clementina's Baybrick =

Lesbian bar in San Francisco, California (1982–1987)

- Location: 1190 Folsom Street, San Francisco, California, U.S.
- Coordinates: 37.775368°N 122.409917°W
- Active dates: September 1982 – October 4, 1987

Clementina's Baybrick, was a lesbian bar, dance club, and hostel in operation from September 1982 to October 1987 in the SoMA neighborhood at 1190 Folsom Street in San Francisco, California. It went by many name variations, including Clementina's Baybrick Inn, Clementina's Bay Brick Inn, The Baybrick, The Bay Brick, and The Brick.

Since 1993, the former Clementina's Baybrick space is known as the Cat Club.

== History ==
The building is located in part of the historic Leather and LGBTQ Cultural District; and was the former location of The Waiting Arms / Earthquake Ethel's (1974), The Hungry Hole (1976–1977), and Brown's Pub (1980–1983). Clementina's was a bar and dance club, and it was inside the basement of the Baybrick Inn building, a hotel. Clementina's was named after the alley it was near. Lauren Hewitt was the owner and manager, she also was a co-organizer of the Gay/Lesbian Freedom Band Festival, and helped plan the 1984 Folsom Street Fair.

Clementina's Baybrick hosted a variety of entertainment events including comedy open mic nights, cabaret nights, a variety of musical performances, dance parties, tea dances, and lesbian-centered strip shows. On October 23, 1983, the Asian Women's Group (AWG) sponsored a dance event, "A Sunday Bash" which was attended by some 125 women. Les Nickelettes, a feminist satirical performance art troupe had a six-week run (around 1983) during the Clementina's Baybrick Wednesday night cabaret series.

The hostel/inn portion closed in 1984. The bar and dance club closed on October 4, 1987.

The GLBT Historical Society in San Francisco holds the archive of records for Clementina's Baybrick.

== See also ==
- List of lesbian bars
