= Sidney S. Liufau =

American actor

Sidney Liufau
- Born: November 22, 1963 (age 62); Kahuku, Hawaii, United States
- Occupation: Director/Actor/Stuntman

Sidney S. Liufau (born 22 November 1963) is an American actor best known for the role of Lt. Manuele Atoa in the Star Trek: Deep Space Nine episode "You Are Cordially Invited". Liufau also appeared in Hawaii Five-O, Street Warrior, Blade, Faster, Planet of the Apes and You, Me and Dupree.

== Career ==
Liufau made his acting debut in the 1995 film Batman Forever, which also featured co-star René Auberjonois. The same year, he appeared in the Baywatch movie Forbidden Paradise. Liufau went on to have small roles in the films A Very Brady Sequel (1996), Bloodsport III (1997, starring John Rhys-Davies), Marvel Comics' Blade (1998, with Judson Scott, Andray Johnson), Dirt Merchant (1999, with Lee Arenberg) and Code of the Dragon (2001, with Brad Dourif and Cary-Hiroyuki Tagawa). More recently, he had a supporting role in the 2006 comedy You, Me and Dupree, which also featured Star Trek: Enterprise guest star Todd Stashwick.

In addition to his film work, Liufau also had a role in an unsold TV pilot called Red Skies (as did Leonard Kelly-Young), TV Pilot Honolulu CRU starring Russell Wong, Michael Rooker and Lori Petty, also guest-starred on an episode of The District, starring Roger Aaron Brown and Ernest Borgnine. He most recently had a recurring role on the short-lived CBS action series Smith, working with series regular Virginia Madsen and fellow guest actors Ray Liotta and Simon Baker. He also appeared in Alex Kurtzman's and Roberto Orci's remake of Hawaii Five-O in the episode "Malama Ka Aina" as Daniel Dae Kim's character's cousin.

== Filmography ==
=== Film ===
Year	Title	Role	Notes
1985	Sword of Heaven	Martial arts fighter	
1990	Joe Versus the Volcano	Waponi	Uncredited
1995	Batman Forever	Harvey's Thug	
1995	Baywatch: Forbidden Paradise	Mako	Direct-to-video
1996	A Very Brady Sequel	Security Guard	
1996	Bloodsport III	Kimo Lima Lama	
1997	Fire Down Below	Bodyguard	Uncredited
1998	Deadly Ransom	Bruno	
1998	Blade	Japanese Doorman	
1999	Dirt Merchant	El Nino	
2000	The Testaments: Of One Fold and One Shepherd	Judge hunter 1	
2001	The Ghost	Wu's Thug No.1	
2006	You, Me and Dupree	Paco	
2010	Faster	Kenny	
2012	The Girl from the Naked Eye	Moses	
2012	Lose Yourself	Ray-Ray	Direct-to-video
2013	The Lost Medallion: The Adventures of Billy Stone	Short Thug / Short Tracker	
2014	My Trip Back to the Dark Side	Ray-Ray	
2015	To Topple an Empire	Jeffrey	

=== Television ===
Year	Title	Role	Notes
1996	Baywatch	Mako	Episode: "Forbidden Paradise: Part 2"
1997	The New Adventures of Robin Hood	Master Ika	Episode: "The Prey"
1997	Star Trek: Deep Space Nine	Lt. Manuele Atoa	Episode: "You Are Cordially Invited"
1998	Honolulu CRU	Det. Kamakawewaole	Episode: "Pilot"
2001	Black Scorpion	Thief	Episode: "Kiss of Death"
2002	Red Skies	Kay	Television film
2003	The District	Sammy Harimoto	Episode: "Last Waltz"
2003	Baywatch: Hawaiian Wedding	Victor	Television film
2006–2007	Smith	Kala Tafattafua	3 episodes
2008	Street Warrior	Isaiah Griffin	Television film
2010	Hawaii Five-0	Sid	Episode: "Malama Ka Aina"
