= You Are Cordially Invited =

- Star Trek: Deep Space Nine episode
- Episode no.: Season 6 Episode 7
- Directed by: David Livingston
- Written by: Ronald D. Moore
- Cinematography by: Jonathan West
- Production code: 531
- Original air date: November 10, 1997
- Running time: 45 minutes

Guest appearances
- J. G. Hertzler as Martok; Marc Worden as Alexander Rozhenko; Shannon Cochran as Sirella; Chase Masterson as Leeta; Aron Eisenberg as Nog; Max Grodénchik as Rom; Sidney S. Liufau as Manuele Atoa

Episode chronology
← Previous "Sacrifice of Angels"	Next → "Resurrection"
- Star Trek: Deep Space Nine season 6

"You Are Cordially Invited" is the seventh episode of the sixth season of the syndicated American science fiction television series Star Trek: Deep Space Nine, the 131st episode overall.

Set in the 24th century, the series follows the adventures on Deep Space Nine, a space station located near a stable wormhole between the Alpha and Gamma quadrants of the Milky Way Galaxy. This episode focuses on the wedding of main characters Worf and Jadzia Dax, in a break from the ongoing dramatic storyline of the Dominion War. Guest stars with major roles in the episode include J. G. Hertzler as Martok, Marc Worden as Alexander Rozhenko and Shannon Cochran as Sirella.

This had Nielsen ratings of 6.5 points, the highest of Season 6.

== Plot ==
Lieutenant Commanders Worf and Jadzia Dax plan their long-awaited wedding. Since Dax will be joining Worf's surrogate family, the House of Martok, she agrees to endure the traditional evaluation by the mistress of the house, Martok's wife, Sirella. Dax is surprised to learn that as a non-Klingon she will almost certainly fail to gain Sirella's favor. Learning that Sirella disapproves of Dax, Worf asks Martok to intervene, but Martok refuses to interfere with Sirella's prerogative.

Worf invites his son Alexander, as well as Captain Sisko, Chief O'Brien, and Dr. Bashir to join him and Martok in Kal'Hyah, which they expect to be the Klingon equivalent of a bachelor party. They are disappointed to learn that it is actually a four-day ceremonial ordeal consisting of physical trials that include fasting and bloodletting.

Dax struggles to meet Sirella's exacting standards. When asked to recite the history of Sirella's family, Dax infuriates her prospective mother-in-law by revealing her discovery that Sirella has no imperial blood, and is descended from a concubine.

Dax throws herself a bachelorette party, which Sirella interrupts to demand that she perform a ritual. When Dax tells her to leave, Sirella threatens to cancel the wedding. The confrontation escalates into a physical assault, and Sirella storms out. The next morning, Worf informs Dax that Sirella has forbidden her to join the House of Martok. He asks her to beg Sirella's forgiveness, but Dax refuses to endure any further humiliation just so Worf can have a Klingon ceremony. He rejects her suggestion to simply have Sisko officiate, and the two call off the wedding.

Martok persuades Worf to apologize to Dax, but she refuses to change her mind. Determined to see the lovers wed, Sisko goes to see Dax. She describes the indignities to which she has been subjected, reminding Sisko that, as Curzon Dax, she was Federation Ambassador to the Klingon Empire. Sisko points out that even though she shares Curzon's memories, she is a new person, and that Sirella sees her only as a young woman who wants to marry into her family. Sisko states that Dax knew what she was getting into when she agreed to marry Worf, and she must honor the traditions of his people. Warmed by her deep love for Worf, Dax follows Sisko's advice, and they are married with Sirella's blessing. Once the ceremony is complete, O'Brien and Bashir enthusiastically attack the couple with padded staves, both in keeping with Klingon wedding traditions and to avenge themselves for the hardships they have endured.

== Reception ==
In 2019, CBR rated "You Are Cordially Invited" the 13th funniest Star Trek episode. In particular, they note that Bashir and O'Brien, ready to enjoy what they presume to be a party, must endure a night of arduous Klingon rituals with Worf.

In 2018, SyFy included this episode on their Jadzia Dax binge-watching guide for this character.

== Legacy ==
Game designer, Unitvector, created the text adventure game "The Path of Clarity" based on "You are Cordially Invited".
