= Mitchell Brothers O'Farrell Theatre =

Former San Francisco strip club (1969–2020)

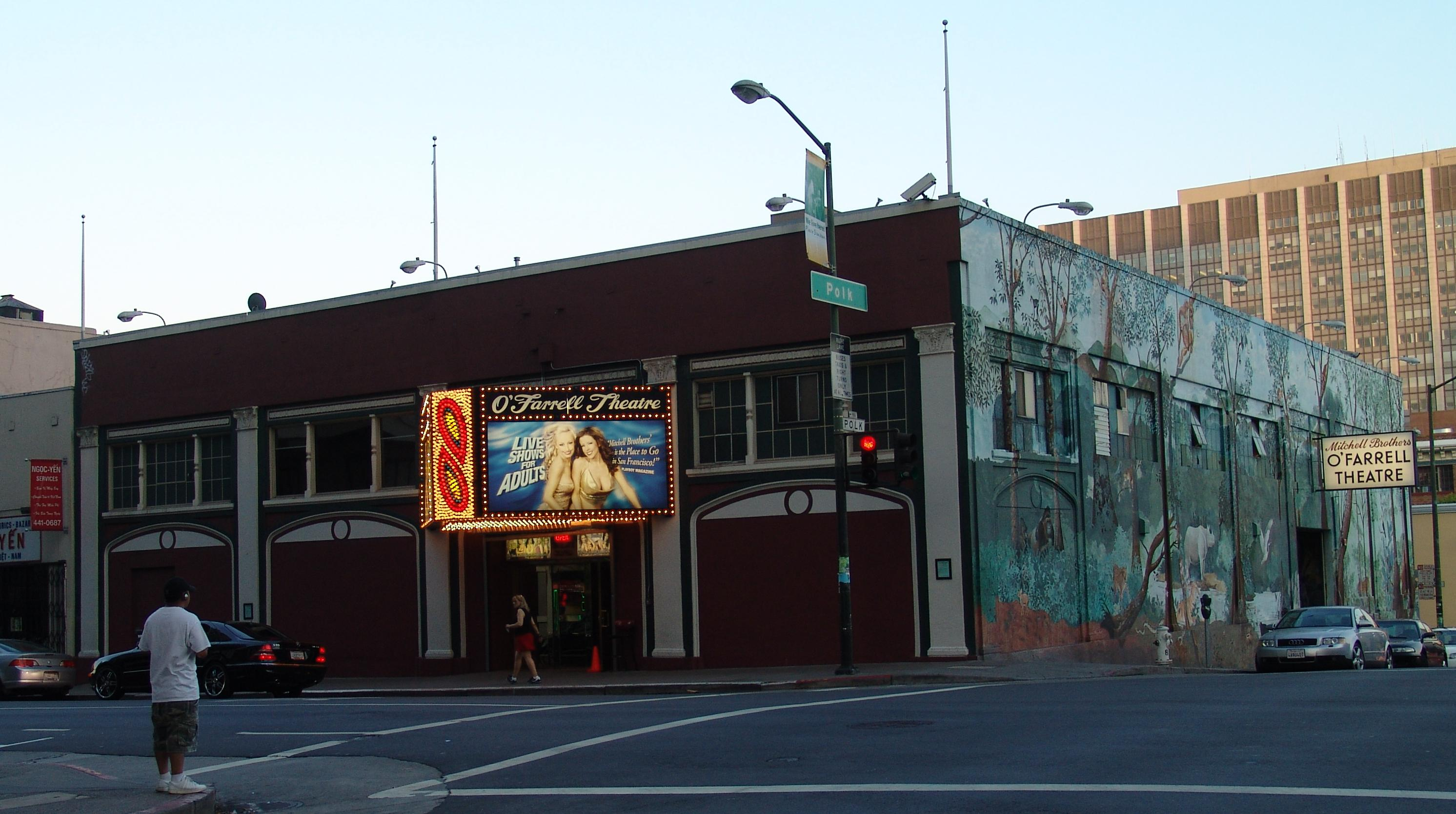
- O'Farrell Theatre in 2006
- Interactive map of Mitchell Brothers O'Farrell Theatre
- Address: 895 O'Farrell Street; San Francisco, California
- Coordinates: 37.784877°N 122.419295°W

Construction
- Opened: July 4, 1969

Website
- ofarrell.com

The Mitchell Brothers O'Farrell Theatre was a strip club at 895 O'Farrell Street near San Francisco's Tenderloin neighborhood. Having opened as an X-rated movie theater by Jim and Artie Mitchell on July 4, 1969, the O'Farrell was one of America's most notorious adult-entertainment establishments. By 1980, the nightspot had popularized close-contact lap dancing, which would become the norm in strip clubs nationwide. Journalist Hunter S. Thompson, a longtime friend of the Mitchells and frequent visitor at the club, went there frequently during the summer of 1985 as part of his research for a possible book on pornography. Thompson called the O'Farrell "the Carnegie Hall of public sex in America" and Playboy magazine praised it as "the place to go in San Francisco!"

The club closed permanently in 2020 due to the COVID-19 pandemic, after a few years of struggling financially.

== History ==
The O'Farrell Theatre went through two major phases which reflected a major transition in the Mitchell brothers' business model: first as a movie house to feature their adult films, and later as a cutting-edge strip club which offered customer-contact shows with strippers. Over decades, the events at the O'Farrell Theatre have been as much about the brothers' stubborn persistence in applying legal resources to avoid prosecution by San Francisco's vice squad and district attorney, as they were about their unique innovations for the erotic entertainment industry.

=== Adult movie theater ===
Brothers Jim and Artie Mitchell began showing hardcore pornographic films at the O'Farrell Theater in July 1969. Before they decided to open for business, the brothers had been making and selling short 15 minute pornographic films called loops, which patrons could watch for 25 cents a minute in small arcades. But the brothers wanted to go beyond the production of short loops, and move on to making longer features whose distribution and presentation they could also control. With the conversion of an old Pontiac automobile dealership on O'Farrell and Polk streets, they built a makeshift soundstage for filming and seating for a movie theater to provide them with that opportunity. At a rate of one per month they churned out featurettes, which were 30 to 60 minute films that could be advertised and then shown at the O'Farrell.

But just three weeks after the theater opened, plain-clothed police officers walked in and arrested 25 year-old James Mitchell – still a film student at San Francisco State University – for production and exhibition of obscene material. Not easily deterred, the brothers vowed during a press conference to fight back, and hired a young but fierce lawyer named Michael John Kennedy to defend them against the obscenity charges. Kennedy had already started to build a national reputation as a resourceful political activist, and would later represent Timothy Leary, Bernardine Dohrn, Cesar Chavez, and Huey Newton. With Kennedy and the First Amendment behind them, the Mitchells tenaciously defied authorities by continuing to show their films while being arrested dozens of times over the coming year.

A little more than a year later when the first case made its way to court, the trial became a local media circus as a flamboyant and wisecracking Kennedy irritated the district attorney while he challenged the legal definition of obscenity. After a long trial, the jury became hopelessly deadlocked and the brothers escaped without conviction. Kennedy believed that the social value of pornography was that it served as a shield for the rest of art and literature – meaning that if pornography could not be censored, then other forms of art would be protected as well.

With the adult film Behind the Green Door and its premiere at the O'Farrell in 1972, the Mitchell brothers made their first attempt at creating a feature-length adult film for mainstream audiences. The stigma of sex in mainstream movies had been breaking down with films like Last Tango in Paris, and the Mitchells decided to invest extra time and expense into the film's making. Behind the Green Door enjoyed a national marketing coup when it was revealed that its wholesome-looking 19 year-old star, Marilyn Chambers, was the same model who appeared holding a baby on Ivory Snow detergent boxes. The film was made for $60,000, grossed $2 million in its first year, and later became the second highest grossing adult film of all time when it made more than $50 million. With it the Mitchells became millionaires, opened another ten adult theaters, and had plenty of funds for later experiments at the O'Farrell when it transitioned into a cutting-edge strip club.

In the early 1970s, the theater would stop its adult features at midnight on a couple nights a week, and then re-open as The People's Nickelodeon, along with a five-cent admission charge and free popcorn. The midnight shows were a montage of old films, and live vaudeville-style entertainment provided by the Nickelettes, a chorus line of counter-culture women who would do spunky song-and-dance routines. The audience of young hippies and a few oldsters would see movies such as Marx Brothers, Abbott and Costello, Yellow Submarine or other counter-culture favorites, while occasionally engaging in drinking, marijuana, and general carousing. Inspections and disruptions by the fire department and police were common, but the shows usually continued until three in the morning or later.

=== Strip club ===
Everything changed for the Mitchell brothers during the second half of the 1970s, when the invention of the videocassette recorder brought about a proliferation of video rental shops. First videocassette profits of the brothers' movies began to drop, and then demand for public adult movie screenings began to plummet because customers could now rent movies for one dollar a night. Realizing that they needed a new business model for the O'Farrell Theatre, the Mitchell brothers sent manager Vincent Stanich around the country to explore "customer-contact" shows in bars and strip clubs.

After Stanich reported back, the Mitchell brothers responded by opening three new rooms in quick succession which featured live shows by strippers: The Ultra Room, The Kopenhagen, and New York Live. In 1977 they opened the Ultra Room which featured live shows of lesbian bondage. It had a floor-level stage which was surrounded by thirty narrow booths that had glass to separate performers from patrons. Some months later the booths' glass was taken down and enabled customer-contact shows. The Ultra Room's shows were very popular, cost $10, lasted for a half-hour, and were sold out on the very first day. Next to open was The Kopenhagen which was a small room with perimeter seating that had live shows in front of, and sometimes upon, a small audience by a pair of naked women.

However the club's most profitable new venue was New York Live! which was a strip club act that had a square stage and theater seating on three sides. Strippers performed three song sets while usually being totally nude for the final song. Most of the other strippers who were not performing on stage were sitting naked on customers' laps for tips. As the amount of tipping rapidly increased, employees coined the term 'lap dancing', and the lap dance's popularity caused lines of men to regularly appear outside the theater's doors. The Mitchells hired new dancers as fast as they could to keep up with demand, and with the lap dance they pioneered a strip club innovation which gained them international notoriety and generated more money than their current film business.

Though the O'Farrell Theatre had successfully fought prosecution in the 1970s concerning obscenity in its films, during the 1980s it would face a new kind of threat from the courts about whether customer-contact could be legal during live shows, and if strippers had the right to give lap dances. A new mood came to city hall when Dianne Feinstein became mayor toward the end of 1978 following the assassination of George Moscone. As a city supervisor Feinstein had been a strident anti-porn voice, and then as mayor she made it clear to her district attorney that he should be aggressive on obscenity and porn cases. In July 1980, less than a year after Feinstein had been elected mayor, fifteen police officers raided the O'Farrell Theatre and arrested fourteen patrons, six performers, and seven employees for charges related to prostitution. During a press conference Jim Mitchell vowed to fight the charges and stated, "We believe we have a legally protected show under California laws. Fondling a girl's breast is not prostitution." In the first trial originating from that bust, three strippers faced charges of committing lewd acts in public. The trial resulted in mistrial decisions for two dancers and a single conviction for one dancer. This last was to become the only dancer in O'Farrell history who would ever get a rap sheet for simply performing her duties at the O'Farrell— but she would be sentenced to no jail time, and would be burdened with no fine.

For the next trial of the 1980 bust, the Mitchells went back to the law office of Michael Kennedy and secured his former partner, Dennis Roberts, to represent them. Roberts cleverly found a solution which would derail all the other cases against dancers, by using a little-known statute called the First Offender Diversion Program. Under that diversion program, first time offenders could at any time before conviction plead guilty, go into the program, and emerge without a criminal record. When Roberts first mentioned the diversion program in court, a frustrated prosecutor exclaimed: "You can't do that!" However the judge corrected the prosecutor in stating: "Not only can he do that, but it seems to me that what you're going to have if you keep prosecuting these women is a series of cases that are going to drag on for years toward trial, and as soon as you get into trial Mr. Roberts is going to divert these people." That trial was the last time any performers from the 1980 bust would face prosecution.

In the beginning the dancers of New York Live were nude when they sat on customers' laps, but later in the mid-1980s an agreement was reached between the Mitchell brothers' attorneys and the district attorney which instructed the O'Farrell to ensure that the girls wear some minimal amount of clothing while in the New York Live audience.

The Mitchell brothers supported various cartoon artists, and when the 1984 Democratic National Convention was held in San Francisco, they opened the second floor of the O'Farrell to a group of underground cartoonists covering the convention for the San Francisco Chronicle.

A final attempt was made to prosecute the O'Farrell under the Feinstein administration in February 1985, when the Cine-Stage was raided by a dozen police officers during a headlining appearance by adult film star Marilyn Chambers. However the district attorney declined to press charges against Chambers, and a judge refused to issue a critical injunction against the brothers themselves. Also at that time the police department had been receiving protests by media, public, and politicians concerning multiple scandals, like when a police academy graduate received fellatio from a prostitute at a police academy graduation party. Furthering their problems, police officers arrested a local journalist for walking his dog without a leash after the journalist wrote critically of the police department following the Chambers raid. In the wake of the Chambers raid and scandals by the police, the Board of Supervisors voted to strip the police department of their power to license strip clubs, and that the Mitchell Brothers should be paid $14,000 for damages resulting from the Chambers raid.

Over the years, the Mitchells were the defendants in over 200 court cases involving obscenity or related charges. Mostly victorious, they were represented by aggressive counsel.

In February 1991 the theater entered the news after Jim Mitchell fatally shot Artie. Michael Kennedy defended Jim Mitchell, and convinced the jury that Jim killed Artie because the latter was psychotic from drugs and had become dangerous. Later in 1996, Jim established the "Artie Fund" to raise money for drug-abuse prevention. Jim Mitchell was sentenced to six years in prison for voluntary manslaughter and released from San Quentin in 1997, after having served half his sentence.

During the celebrations for the O'Farrell's 30th anniversary in 1999, burlesque star Tempest Storm, by then in her very early 70s, danced on stage. Mayor Willie Brown declared a "Tempest Storm Day" in her honor. Marilyn Chambers returned to perform in the theater on July 28, 1999, in what Willie Brown dubbed "Marilyn Chambers Day."

When San Francisco's Commission on the Status of Women proposed in 2006 to ban private booths and rooms at adult clubs because of concerns about sexual assaults taking place there, several O'Farrell dancers spoke out against the ban.

As of 2006, Jeff Armstrong, its longtime business manager, continued running the O'Farrell; legal representation is provided by former San Francisco Supervisor and two-term District Attorney Terence Hallinan.

In June 2010, Jim's daughter Meta Mitchell Johnson took control of the O'Farrell as manager. The club closed permanently in 2020 due to the COVID-19 pandemic, after a few years of struggling financially.

== Operation ==
The O'Farrell Theatre was open seven days a week, and nearly every evening of the year. A general admission fee gave access to various themed rooms' live shows within the building, and no alcoholic beverages were served. The O'Farrell's main showroom was New York Live, a continuous striptease show with two song sets on a stage having theater seating on three sides. The Cine-Stage was a 200-seat movie theater with a large raised stage which also presented live shows, comedy skits, and musical performances. There were several themed rooms, such as the Ultra Room, a peep show-type room where patrons would stand in private booths while watching women perform with various props, such as dildos. The Green Door Room was named for the Mitchells' classic film Behind the Green Door, and served as the principal set for some movies. In the darkened Kopenhagen Lounge, customers used flashlights to watch performances by two nude dancers. All the O'Farrell's male employees, including managers, adhered to a strict dress code of black bow-tie, white shirt, black slacks, and black shoes.

== Labor disputes ==
Originally, the O'Farrell Theatre's management company, Cinema 7, paid their dancers a flat rate per shift and allowed them to accept tips, but in the 1980s they replaced that payment with the federal minimum wage while still allowing the dancers to accept tips.

In 1988, the O'Farrell's management (Cinema 7) created a separate company, Dancers Guild International (DGI), that would be run by Vince Stanich, and changed the dancers' status from paid employees to unpaid independent contractors who had to pay DGI "stage fees" of up to $300 per eight-hour shift.

Many of the O'Farrell's dancers considered the O'Farrell's new policy unfair and possibly illegal. Two of them, Ellen Vickery and Jennifer Bryce, filed a class action lawsuit against DGI (the plaintiffs would ultimately number more than 500), arguing that the O'Farrell's reclassification of the dancers as independent contractors was unlawful, and that they were owed back wages as well as a refund of the stage fees. The case was settled in 1998, and the dancers were awarded $2.85 million. Similar suits challenging independent contractor status have since been filed against numerous other strip clubs, and labor commissions as well as courts have mostly ruled in favor of dancers and awarded past wages and stage fee reimbursements. O'Farrell's management remained opposed to all attempts of their dancers to unionize.

After the 1998 settlement, the O'Farrell changed the performers' payment structure again: they posted a "suggested" fee of $20 per lap dance and $40 per private performance and set a quota of $360 per woman per night; the women were allowed to keep half the quota plus all tips. However, it was recorded that lap dances cost as much as $240 on some occasions. Dancers claimed feeling pressured into paying $180 per night even if they had earned less than that amount, and another 370-plaintiff class-action suit began in 2002. In 2007, a judge ruled in favor of the dancers, declaring the quota system illegal and requiring the O'Farrell to pay any amounts employees could show they paid to fill their quotas, minus any amounts the employer could show the dancers had collected but failed to report. The O'Farrell was also ordered to reimburse dancers for required theme-oriented costumes.

Sometime after the settlement of 2008, the club changed its workers' status from independent contractors back to being paid employees who receive a minimum wage, workers comp, and some healthcare coverage.

== Location and murals ==
The theatre is located in the northwest part of the Tenderloin District, at the corner of Polk and O'Farrell street, a few doors down from the Great American Music Hall. The entire exterior west and south faces of the theater are covered with two large murals. The west wall depicts a fantasy aquatic scene with flying fish, turtles and whales with a silhouette of the San Francisco Bay in the background, and on the south wall is an underwater scene featuring a life-sized pod of whales and dolphins. These murals were painted in 1977 (Lou Silva with Ed Monroe, Daniel Burgevin, Todd Stanton, and Gary William Graham), 1983 (Lou Silva-solo), 1990 by Lou Silva with the assistance of Joanne Maxwell Wittenbrook, Ed Monroe, Mark Nathan Clark, and Juan "Blackwolf" Karlos, and 2011 by the Academy of Art University. Notable visitors, while the murals were in progress, included: Melvin Belli, Marilyn Chambers, Paul Kantner, Toshiro Mifune, Huey P. Newton, Hunter S. Thompson, and Edy Williams. The murals were sponsored in their entirety by Jim and Artie Mitchell.

== Noted performers ==
- Lily Burana was involved in the class action suit and wrote about her experiences as dancer at the O'Farrell in her 2001 book Strip City: A Stripper's Farewell Journey Across America (ISBN 0-7868-6790-6).
- Nina Hartley, pornographic film actress and sex educator
- Dana Vespoli, pornographic performer and adult-video director

== See also ==
- List of strip clubs
- Regal Show World
- Market Street Cinema
