= Street Warrior =

- DVD cover
- Written by: Alex Greenfield
- Directed by: David Jackson
- Starring: Max Martini; Reiley McClendon; Simon R. Baker; Sidney S. Liufau
- Theme music composer: Stephen Graziano
- Country of origin: United States
- Original language: English

Production
- Producers: Erik Heiberg; Larry Levinson; Michael Moran; James Wilberger
- Cinematography: Yaron Levy
- Editor: Tricia Gorman
- Running time: 91 minutes
- Production companies: Grand Army Entertainment; Larry Levinson Productions; RHI Entertainment

Original release
- Release: November 1, 2008

Street Warrior is a 2008 action film directed by David Jackson and starring Max Martini, Reiley McClendon, Simon R. Baker, and Sidney S. Liufau.

== Premise ==
Sgt. Jack Campbell, an Iraq War veteran, returns home to find that his brother is in a coma from participating in an illegal underground fight club. Enraged by this, he goes to find the people responsible and takes down anyone who gets in his way.

== Reception ==
A review at DVD talk was extremely negative and wrote; ”From wooden acting, to staid direction, all can be forgiven if your b-action film delivers with some nice fights and stuntwork. Street Warrior falls up short. The style versus style aspect is underplayed in the choreography. While you have the lucha libre guy, the wrestler, the BJJ Nazi?, the big bouncer looking guy, and a redneck (I guess his martial art is muddin' or cow tipping), they aren't exactly the cast of Master of the Flying Guillotine or Bloodsport. The action scenes are filmed in a quick cut, PAN!-ZOOM!, generic way that makes every scene feel the same.”
