= Angel of H.E.A.T. =

1983 film by Myrl A. Schreibman

- Directed by: Myrl A. Schreibman
- Screenplay by: Helen Sanford
- Produced by: Myrl A. Schreibman
- Starring: Marilyn Chambers
- Cinematography: Jacques Haitkin
- Edited by: Barry Zetlin
- Music by: Guy Sobell
- Release date: 1983
- Running time: 93 minutes
- Country: United States
- Language: English

Angel of H.E.A.T. is an American science fiction softcore sex comedy film directed and produced by Myrl A. Schreibman and starring Marilyn Chambers.

== Cast ==
- Marilyn Chambers as Angel Harmony
- Stephen Johnson as Mark Wisdom
- Mary Woronov as Samantha Vitesse
- Milt Kogan as Harry Covert
- Remy O'Neill as Andrea Shockley
- Dan Jesse as Albert Shockley
- Gerald Okamura as Hans Zeisel
- Randy West as "Mean" Wong (credited as Andy Abrams)
- Harry Townes as Peter Shockley
- Jerry Riley as Randy Small
- Hal Kant as George
- Janis Thrash as "Tiny"
- Tony D'Andrea as Faux Pas Emcee
- Nelson Kirby as High Roller
- Jitty Dufresne as Marsha Nutts
- Tanya Santos as Lola Bolts
- Robin Fenton as Martina
- Maxine Lee Walrod as Hologram Lady
- Steve Cloud as Himself

== Production ==
Angel of H.E.A.T. was filmed in 1981 under the title The Protectors, Book #1. The film was shot in the Lake Tahoe region.

== Release ==
Lor of Variety stated that by 1983 the theatrical market for films like Angel of H.E.A.T. had changed so much that the film was unreleased and shown as "cable-tv filler" and as a home video title. The film was first released in 1983, and on DVD on January 13, 2004 by Monterey Video.

== Reception ==
Lor gave the film a negative review, noting poorly executed martial arts sequences, and that the film "wanders for the first few reels, with lots of dumb puns, bare breasts and failed gags". In his book reviewing horror and science fiction films, Donald Willis declared the film to be "failed semi-camp" and that it was "iffy even as a showcase for Marilyn Chambers" noting that the filmmakers seemed to believe that the narrative would be of more interest than Chambers' role which, he considered a "bad miscalculation".
