= Canadian Pickers =

Canadian television reality series

- Also known as: Cash Cowboys
- Genre: Reality
- Starring: Scott Cozens; Sheldon Smithens
- Original language: English
- No. of seasons: 4
- No. of episodes: 39 (list of episodes)

Production
- Production locations: Calgary, Alberta
- Running time: 60 minutes
- Production company: Cineflix Inc.

Original release
- Network: History
- Release: April 12, 2011 – December 23, 2013

Canadian Pickers (internationally known as Cash Cowboys) is a Canadian television reality series filmed in Calgary, Alberta, which currently airs reruns on History. The show was also previously shown on DTour and Historia. The series was canceled on November 19, 2013, with the final episodes airing on December 23, 2013.

== Overview ==
Similar in format to Cineflix's production American Pickers, Canadian Pickers follows Scott Cozens and Sheldon Smithens as they travel across Canada looking for items in basements, garages, attics, sheds, barns, warehouses, storage units, flea markets, yard sales, and shops. Always clad in cowboy hats and Western wear, the pair make use of their folksy charm when negotiating the purchase of collectibles ranging from vintage furniture, antiques, and advertising to all things Canadiana in hopes of making a profit upon their resale.

Scott Cozens is a former electrician turned full-time lawyer practising in Calgary, Alberta. He can be found spending his free time traveling across Canada pursuing his childhood passion as a picker.

Sheldon Smithens is a third-generation antiques dealer, auctioneer, and appraiser with a vast knowledge of antiques and collectibles qualifying him as a professional picker. When not on picking expeditions, Sheldon teaches continuing education courses in antiques collecting at the University of Calgary located in Calgary, Alberta.

On April 12, 2011, Season 1 of Canadian Pickers debuted on History Television (which became History in August 2012). Building on the success of the first season, Season 2 aired from January 2012 to April 2012 followed by Season 3 which began airing in August 2012.

== International broadcast ==
The series is syndicated outside of Canada under the name Cash Cowboys:

- Australia: 7mate and A&E
- Brazil: National Geographic
- Norway: TV 2 Zebra
- Slovenia: Kanal A
- United Kingdom: History
- United States: H2

== See also ==
- Cineflix Pickers franchise
  - American Pickers
  - Aussie Pickers
- Picker Sisters, a similar series with female leads based in the United States.
