= List of Canadian Pickers episodes =

This is a list of television episodes of the Canadian series Canadian Pickers. The series is broadcast by that name on the Canadian History channel, and as Cash Cowboys in other countries.

== Season 1 ==
No. overall	No. in season	Title	Location	Original release date
1	1	"On The Cowboy Trail"	Alberta	12 April 2011
Venturing down Alberta's Highway 22 known as the Cowboy Trail, Scott Cozens and Sheldon Smithens do some picking at the legendary Blackfoot Truck Stop, wrangle a saddle and stagecoach collection in Lethbridge, find some oddball items at a former church in Fort Macleod, and hit a mining museum in Bellevue where everything must go.
2	2	"Bargaining in the Badlands"	Alberta	19 April 2011
While traveling north of Calgary, Alberta, Scott and Sheldon visit a sprawling graveyard of historic cars. Later, they meet a collector who has everything from classic snowmobiles to vintage Barbie dolls at unbelievable prices. In Horseshoe Canyon, the guys stop in at the Last Chance Saloon, a century-old watering hole packed with amazing memories and incredible collectibles.
3	3	"Take It And Run"	Southern Ontario	26 April 2011
In Southern Ontario, Scott and Sheldon find a collector whose house is packed with everything from velvet Elvis Presley paintings to thousands of rare vinyl albums. Then, the guys scour an outdoor antique show with steep prices and one vendor who drives Scott nuts. Later, a gentleman farmer ready to deal welcomes the guys into his 150-year-old barn.
4	4	"Anchors Aweigh"	Prince Edward Island	3 May 2011
The pickers set out for the Maritime province of Prince Edward Island in Eastern Canada where they hit a famous 70-mile garage sale with loads of junk but a few unexpected finds. Later, they discover an art gallery owner and her equally impressive home packed with East Coast treasures. Then the guys hear that the Lucy Maud Montgomery Museum is closing down and jump at the chance for a piece of Canadian history...but it proves to be a near-impossible pick.
5	5	"A Maritime Bet"	Nova Scotia	10 May 2011
Trekking through the Maritimes province of Nova Scotia, Scott and Sheldon bet on who will find the ultimate East Coast pick. The competition heats up when the guys get priority access to an off-limits antique warehouse in Great Village. Later, a lifetime collector opens up his impressive personal museum filled with 100 years of pop culture items prime for picking.
6	6	"Knocking on Doors"	Nova Scotia	17 May 2011
Scott and Sheldon continue their trek through Nova Scotia and while freestyle picking, they score access to a Victorian home's inner sanctum. Later, George "The Junkman" shows of his collection, and the guys take a big gamble on a unique item. Later in the quaint coastal village of Pugwash, the guys seal a few sweet deals in an attic and consider getting tetanus shots after picking through junk in a jam-packed bus.
7	7	"Fish Out of Water"	Quebec	24 May 2011
While in Quebec, the guys pick through a prolific collector's home, garage, and bar located in Hudson and marvel over two stunning rocking horses over 100 years old. Later, Scott raids a Star Wars collector's treasure chest. Finally, the guys crash a high-society antique show where they prove they can wheel and deal with the champagne set.
8	8	"The French Connection"	Quebec	31 May 2011
Scott and Sheldon head to the Eastern Townships region in southeastern Quebec where they visit a home filled with 200-year-old antiques. Then the guys visit the property of an auction and garage sale junkie with barn after barn of unbelievable items. Later, the pickers relic-hunt a ten-room Sherbrooke home of a fellow picker where they are granted access to an off-limits room laden with treasures.
9	9	"A Monster Deal"	Winnipeg, Manitoba	7 June 2011
The guys scour a Winnipeg, Manitoba flea market in search of hidden treasure. Later, they creep through a Frankenstein-inspired basement of horrors featuring a collection of life-size mummies and mannequins as well as a horrific statue of Nosferatu. Then, Scott and Sheldon find themselves in a suburban home overflowing with antiques and rare curios. Finally, while visiting an old friend at his general store, Scott and Sheldon negotiate priority access to his jam-packed garage.
10	10	"Always Buying, Sometimes Selling"	Alberta	14 June 2011
When visiting a wisecracking 84-year-old Alberta collector, Scott finds himself in the line of fire. The guys then sift through an unbelievable farm collection before getting a once-in-a-lifetime joyride. Later, a cowboy junkie unveils his impressive stockpile of memorabilia. And finally, after months on the road and their warehouse overflowing, the guys invite their antique dealer friends over for a no-holds-barred sales extravaganza.
11	11	"Rocking On"	Ontario	21 June 2011
The guys visit a sprawling Ontario property with so many outbuildings it could double as a village. Picking from a fellow picker, the guys then spot a pricey must-have item that rocks their world. Later, a father and son's "nostalgia warehouse" looks like a dream come true. Finally, with a great business philosophy and loads of mantiques, Tim is in the running for the best speedpick ever.
12	12	"Hey, Big Spender"	British Columbia	28 June 2011
Scott and Sheldon find themselves in British Columbia ready to blow a big wad of cash on a few West Coast treasures. After admiring a stand of giant totem poles, the two then visit a prolific collector who says he's prepared to sell. Later, the pickers visit Henry's immaculate showroom, but his prices are a nightmare...that is, until Scott hatches a plan and turns on the charm. Later, the guys visit Harvey and his Hobbit-style village housing a massive collection of unusual items and curios, but because the collector dreams of someday opening a museum, he's not quite ready to sell. Finally, the two step into a sprawling main street emporium in Chilliwack filled to the brim with antiques and pop culture artifacts; when Sheldon spies an impressive collection of native masks, the guys go all out to make a serious offer.
13	13	"Grumps And Grinders"	Fraser Valley, British Columbia	5 July 2011
Hoping to do some fertile picking in British Columbia's Fraser Valley, Scott and Sheldon scour through "Grumpy and Granny's" vast collection of all things Canadiana; after Scott climbs to the rafters to snag a rare gem, Granny unveils a choice totem pole that heats up the negotiations. Later, the guys peruse a retro service station packed with killer automotive stuff but find most of it is off limits until they hatch a clever but risky strategy. Finally, the two pickers find themselves in the midst of a sprawling personal museum which is meticulously organized in shipping containers like nothing they've ever seen before.

== Season 2 ==
No. overall	No. in season	Title	Location	Original release date
14	1	"A Jumbo Pick"	TBD	23 January 2012
Scott and Sheldon come face-to-face with a train bell that might have come from the famed train crash that killed P.T. Barnum's Jumbo the Circus Elephant in the late 1800s. If the provenance holds true, it could be their biggest payday ever. And from hidden garages full of antique toys to a property stacked with vintage amusement rides, the guys go toy crazy but negotiations for the prized possessions aren't a game.
15	2	"Guys And Gas"	TBD	23 January 2012
The guys get revved up during a sneak peek for a massive auction of antique cars, retro gas pumps, and pop-culture collectibles, but the seller's sentimental attachment leaves the prices sky-high. Stiff competition at the auction makes Sheldon jumpy, but their luck changes when they find great deals down the road. And a local vendor's huge assortment of mint-condition poison bottles and medical instruments could prove to be a real killing.
16	3	"Big Things Happening"	Alberta	30 January 2012
Scott and Sheldon go picking in Central Alberta where they come upon a glitzy showroom full of extraordinary antique cars, jukeboxes, and tin trucks. At a nearby farm, a dedicated collector of primitive furniture gets the guys excited with choice handmade pieces. A barber and antique sign collector in Calgary shaves down their bank account and trims down Scott's hair. And down a long country road, Scott and Sheldon are more than eager to help an old friend downsize 40 years of history.
17	4	"Canoe Conundrum"	Saskatchewan	6 February 2012
The guys hunt for a classic, old Canadian canoe in the Canadian Prairies of northern Saskatchewan but find themselves up a creek without a paddle when collectors aren't too keen to sell. At a La Ronge trading post filled with choice furs, bear traps, and beaded buckskin jackets, Scott gets frustrated when the proprietor won't even sell them his dried beaver balls. And deep in the wilderness, the two discover a treasure trove of stunning historic canoes; but to get just one, they have to haggle with a quick-witted teenage girl.
18	5	"Screeched In!"	Newfoundland	13 February 2012
The guys head to the Atlantic Canadian island of Newfoundland in the province of Newfoundland and Labrador where they relic-hunt a former church filled to the rafters with handmade furniture, a shark's jaw, and vintage photographs. Sheldon then spots a solid brass ship wheel akin to the nautical world's holy grail. Later in Port de Grave, Scott struggles to get a read on a local picking legend whose wild collection includes an erotic powder horn. But before they can start the dealmaking, the guys have to become honorary Newfoundlanders by getting screeched in.
19	6	"The Bet"	Newfoundland	20 February 2012
The pickers continue their hunt on the island of Newfoundland and wager to see who can find the greatest piece of kitsch. In the process, they meet a salty dog of a seller who tries to fleece the mainlanders when they spot a rare dogsled circa World War II. The guys then go on a feeding frenzy in a private collector's barn filled with authentic local furniture priced to sell. And in nearby Torbay, Sheldon finds a classic kitsch curio steeped in controversial Newfoundland history that he's sure will beat all the items Scott has picked up along the way.
20	7	"Mining For Gold"	British Columbia	27 February 2012
Scott and Sheldon roll up their sleeves and dig deep around Southern British Columbia's mining towns. In Six Mall Cross, the guys get creative when they visit an eccentric dealer who keeps most of his treasures rusting outside. In Spillimacheen, they sift through a relic hunter's 40-year collection of mining memorabilia, and Scott gets jazzed to find a large stash of Dave Brubeck vinyl albums. A hot tip then leads the two to the motherlode of all collections but getting the collector to sell is another story. And when Scott and Sheldon buy two mystery trunks sight unseen from a lifelong picker, they hope they've struck gold.
21	8	"Sasquatch Country"	British Columbia	5 March 2012
Keeping one eye out for Bigfoot, the pickers continue their trek across Southern British Columbia when they come up against a poker-faced collector stocked to the gills with local memorabilia. Then in Creston, Scott's eyes light up when a motivated seller shows the guys her cornucopia of vintage pedal cars, penny toys, and miniatures...but if only she would sell her husband's mint-condition toy trucks. Later in Cranbrook, a cowboy collector's glitzy silver saddle impresses, but its hefty price tag wipes off the sheen. But when the saddle owner tips off the guys to a hot collection of cedar-stripped canoes, the pickers perk back up.
22	9	"Strange Animals"	Quebec	12 March 2012
The pickers charge out of the gate in Quebec's horse country to find the area's finest antiques. At the first stop, Sheldon zeroes in on an unusual Inuit carving by a famous artist. Down the road, the guys press a farmer and lifelong collector to sell some of his prized turn-of-the-century farm equipment, vintage signage, and amusement park games. Later, Scott makes an outrageous offer when he spots a rare tin can. Then in a massive storage space filled with horse collectibles, the guys spot the best equestrian pieces they've ever seen.
23	10	"Hockey in Habs' Country"	Quebec/Eastern Ontario	19 March 2012
While traveling through Quebec deep in Habs country, Scott and Sheldon come upon nine tables in Canada's longest running bar reportedly from a tavern once owned by Henri "The Pocket-Rocket" Richard, the famed Montreal Canadiens hockey player. Later, the guys are in the Eastern Ontario town of Hawkesbury where they try to slash a local collector's high prices. With the local collector leading the way, the three then head to an antiques market in the middle of the night for some flashlight picking. Finally, Scott and Sheldon's attempts to authenticate the nine tavern tables lead the two pickers to pure hockey gold.
24	11	"Over A Barrel"	Niagara Falls, Ontario	26 March 2012
The pickers hit the city of Niagara Falls, Ontario, on their hunt for big deals. Their first stop finds them in the middle of the strip staring down a collector's memorabilia and bizarre pieces. But when they come nose-to-nose with two massive clown faces and a gargantuan model of the World's Heaviest Man, Scott and Sheldon get down to some serious haggling. At the city's oldest restaurant, the seemingly mild-mannered proprietor turns up the heat when Scott tries to low-ball him on a pile of war medallions, one-of-a-kind buttons, and souvenirs. Sheldon hits the deck, but Scott gears up for battle.
25	12	"Adventure Capital"	Ottawa Valley, Eastern Ontario/Western Quebec	2 April 2012
The pickers hit the Ottawa Valley straddling Eastern Ontario and Western Quebec and hope the area's rich history will land some serious finds. First, Scott and Sheldon meet every picker's dream: a lifelong collector who has never sold a piece...until now. But her emotional attachment makes it almost impossible to break the ice. Next, Scott and Sheldon discover an eclectic array of iron works, but the owner of the collection is one tough negotiator. Then the pickers pull into an Old English Manor filled with five generations of high-quality antiques including a Pequegnat clock, an early Victorian tea box, and a massive and pristine Coca-Cola sign. Thinking they've hit the jackpot, they almost stop dead in their tracks after finding out the collection comes with a host of ghosts.
26	13	"Cowboy Country"	Alberta	9 April 2012
The pickers head deep into Alberta's cowboy country to lasso their fair share of treasures. First, they meet up with a friendly collector of TV and film cowboy memorabilia from the 1940s, '50s, and '60s and his awe-inspiring collection kindles the pickers' love of all things western. Then they meet a celebrity air pilot with two hangars stuffed full of vintage planes, cars, and bicycles. But when the collector sets his prices sky high, Scott and Sheldon struggle to get the deals rolling. Later, Scott and Sheldon stage a massive public auction to replenish their bank accounts and with droves of buyers, Scott finds himself struggling as a first-time auctioneer.

== Season 3 ==
No. overall	No. in season	Title	Location	Original release date
27	1	"How Much Is Too Much"	Vancouver Island, British Columbia	27 August 2012
The pickers are optimistic when they hit Vancouver Island in search of great stuff. They find mountains of treasures, but everyone's prices are sky high. Scott and Sheldon don't want to return home empty-handed, so they put their heads together and come up with an unbeatable strategy.
28	2	"Win Some, Lose Some"	Vancouver, British Columbia	3 September 2012
Excited to arrive in Vancouver for some great picks, Scott and Sheldon waste no time on the ferry when they meet an aboriginal artist carrying a huge bag of exquisite carvings. The moment the pickers hit the mainland, they seek out dedicated collectors. Everything is going as planned until they veer off-road and wind up on a whole new adventure.
29	3	"Time To Sell"	Southern Ontario	10 September 2012
The pickers hit Southern Ontario to greet the royalty of the collecting world. They head to Brantford, Ontario, where they meet a seller dubbed the Tin King. Then in Peterborough, Ontario, they visit the Prince of Puppets whose sky high prices force the pickers into heavy negotiations. Back home in Calgary, Alberta, Scott and Sheldon finally hire a new employee and quickly put him to work on a massive public sale of their own.
30	4	"Fresh Starts"	Alberta	17 September 2012
Scott and Sheldon comb through their own backyard picking Alberta's best pieces. What begins as a casual look through a seller's collection, turns into a huge payday when the guys stumble on a valuable pick. They meet a collector of Coca-Cola memorabilia who takes his obsession to religious heights. And Sheldon's eyes get sparkly when he comes face-to-face with some elegant American art glass, but the high prices dull the shine.
31	5	"Macho Challenge"	British Columbia	24 September 2012
The pickers scour interior British Columbia for quality pieces and set a friendly wager: The one who picks the most macho item wins a beer. They zip around Armstrong, Abbotsford, and Mission and pick up a cool collection of trolley ads, tin litho signs, atlases, and rare gas pumps. But when Sheldon finds a 1920s leather football helmet and Scott scoops up a vintage grip meter, both are convinced they have won the macho challenge.
32	6	"All in the Family"	Winnipeg, Manitoba	1 October 2012
Scott and Sheldon hit up Manitoba's capital city of Winnipeg in search of great finds, but this time Scott throws a bit of a twist into the first pick: his two sons, Liam and Nash. When Nash wants to buy a WWI bayonet, it's clear he's caught the picker's bug. The guys then find a huge vintage neon sign shop filled with electrifying but delicate pieces.
33	7	"Mystery Map"	Saskatchewan	15 October 2012
Guided by a mysterious treasure map, Scott and Sheldon drive deep into prairie Saskatchewan in search of a huge bounty. From Regina to Avonlea and finally Moose Jaw, the pickers are overwhelmed with collections that are filled to the rafters. After climbing through mountains of junk, the guys emerge with some valuable items, but it all goes bust when they get it home.
34	8	"Drive To Win"	Saskatchewan	22 October 2012
The pickers rummage through central Saskatchewan bickering over who is the better driver, but it's the dealers on the road driving the hard bargains. The guys careen through the Prairies collecting a bounty of vintage pistols, antique toys, and an inflatable Coca-Cola display. When Scott challenges Sheldon to a showdown at a hot rod repair shop, Sheldon has one last chance to prove himself behind the wheel.
35	9	"Eye Spy"	Southern Ontario	29 October 2012
Scott and Sheldon head to cottage country in Southern Ontario while keeping close tabs on Keenan, their newbie warehouse manager. The price of antique canoes in Haliburton and Buckhorn has them up a creek, but a cache of vintage guitars in an old barn has Scott and Sheldon strumming a different tune. Keenan's shenanigans pay off for Sheldon in unexpected ways.
36	10	"Getting Lucky"	Nova Scotia	5 November 2012
The pickers take the eastern Maritime province of Nova Scotia by storm hoping they'll get lucky with their picks. With superstitions in tow, Scott taunts Sheldon with a tattoo meant to keep their picking luck flowing. The superstitious ploy might be working, because the guys pick the best Red Indian sign they've ever seen. Keenan bungles along at the warehouse and could use a little luck of his own.
37	11	"Nothing To Spare"	New Brunswick	12 November 2012
The guys head again to Eastern Canada, this time to the Maritime province of New Brunswick. While perplexed by Scott's hunt for chipped and broken knick-knacks which Scott calls "goolyas", Sheldon is cured of his ills in a vintage pharmacy by a rare, suppository maker. They then come upon a collector's spectacular cache of rare, local mantiques. Finally back home in Calgary, Scott plays a different kind of game with his bag of recently collected goolyas, and the result has Sheldon bowling over in amusement.
38	12	"Diggin Deep"	Quebec	19 November 2012
Digging deep in Quebec, Scott finds himself losing his cool when one dealer's prices are as high as his massive, three-storey barn. But Sheldon's cooler head keeps the pick going, and the two end up with some great finds. Later, Scott and Sheldon revisit a local picker friend and come upon a very rare Smokey the Bear forest service sign and some vintage hockey seats to be signed by NHL legend, Guy Lafleur; but it appears as if the guys are being stalked throughout the pick by two creepy, vintage dolls named Clarice and Pat. Free of the dolls, it's Scott and Sheldon's turn to play the stalker as they follow a truck whose bed is stacked full of some killer signage. Back home in Calgary, Keenan is unable to figure out the purpose of an odd wooden box but comes through by lining up an appraisal for a Texaco advertising sign.
39	13	"Yukon Bound"	Yukon	26 November 2012
Scott and Sheldon search for pickers gold in the far northwestern territory of Yukon and challenge each other to sip the dreaded "Sour Toe Cocktail". Along the way, they meet a bunch of characters in Whitehorse, Tagish, and Dawson and uncover a hand-carved bear statue, a woolly mammoth tusk, and some prehistoric bison skulls. When Scott consummates the drinking challenge by biting a frostbitten toe, all eyes are on a queasy looking Sheldon.

== Season 4 ==
No. overall	No. in season	Title	Location	Original release date
40	1	"Bad to the Bone"	Ottawa	26 August 2013
The guys fight an ugly snowstorm as they make their way to Ottawa. Ready to downsize and motivated to sell, Brad’s treasure-filled collection is a bonanza of rare Canadiana, including a pricey narwhal tusk and an unmentionable walrus part. In Ed’s motorcycle garage in Havelock, Scott and Sheldon strike a classic Easy Rider pose on two legendary bikes. And when Scott asks Ed to build him one, he learns how expensive legends can be. Outside Campbellford, a father and son team have an awesome collection, but their prices are through the roof. Back at home, Keenan leaves the guys in the lurch to pursue his boxing career, so they call in a friend who proves to be a whiz at sales. Country singer George Canyon calls with a special request for his new ranchhouse and challenges the guys to a wager they can’t resist.
41	2	"City Pickers"	Southern Ontario	2 September 2013
On their first-ever Toronto pick, Scott and Sheldon swing by Peter’s Barber Shop. A veritable shrine to the Maple Leafs, owner Pete is determined to make a sale. Taking a break from big city traffic, it’s down to the wire when Sheldon challenges Scott to a 15-minute pick-a-thon. After 60 years of collecting, Helen is eager to downsize but her husband Bill has a hard time letting go. On the couple’s idyllic property in Roseneath, Ontario, the guys climb to the rafters in a ramshackle old barn and Scott’s low-key strategy pays off. In Picton, 16-year-old Bradley proves he’s a seasoned picker and a tough negotiator. His bedroom is filled with hundreds of rare pieces and cool antiques, plus he’s got a jam-packed storage unit down the street. Back in Calgary, Brooke joins the warehouse staff and the guys unveil their latest haul.
