= Picker Sisters =

- Starring: Tanya McQueen; Tracy Hutson
- Country of origin: United States
- No. of seasons: 1
- No. of episodes: 8

Production
- Executive producers: Gena McCarthy; Josh Bingham; Rob Sharenow; Sandy Varo Jarrell; Tom Forman
- Production company: RelativityReal

Original release
- Network: Lifetime
- Release: August 2 – September 6, 2011

Picker Sisters is an American reality television show airing on the Lifetime network. The series premiered on August 2, 2011.

== Premise ==
The series follows Tracy Hutson and Tanya McQueen, who travel around the United States in search of antiques and rare collectibles for their home decor store in Los Angeles.

== Episodes ==
No.	Title	Original release date
1	"Texas, Here We Come"	August 2, 2011
2	"The Promise of an Empty Trailer"	August 2, 2011
3	"Motorcycles and Meat Sauce"	August 9, 2011
4	"Don't Be a Pecky Head"	August 16, 2011
5	"The Do's and Don'ts of Life on the Road"	August 23, 2011
6	"Pickin' for Peanuts"	August 30, 2011
7	"Must Love Rust"	August 30, 2011
8	"It's a Sign"	September 6, 2011

== See also ==
- American Pickers, a series with a similar premise on History.
- Canadian Pickers, a series with a similar premise based in Canada
- Aussie Pickers, a similar TV series featuring two pickers in Australia on the A&E Australia channel.
