= Tracy Hutson =

American reality television personality (born 1976)

- Born: Tracy Hutson; March 18, 1976 (age 49); Texas, United States
- Occupations: Producer, Interior Designer, Actress
- Years active: 2003–present
- Spouse: Barry Watson (m. 2006; div. 2010)
- Children: 2

Tracy Hutson (born March 18, 1976) is an entrepreneur, a television producer, and an American reality television personality including being one of the original style consultants on ABC TV's television series Extreme Makeover: Home Edition. Hutson grew up in Dallas, Texas.

== Acting career ==
Hutson has appeared in a number of national television commercials, as well as sitcoms including Damaged Goods and Less Than Perfect.

Her film roles include the 1997 independent film Mixed Signals and the 2000 independent film Endsville. Further, she appeared in the May 2000 TV movie Rated X, which also starred Charlie Sheen and Emilio Estevez; in this film, she portrayed adult film star Marilyn Chambers.

== Design career ==
Hutson began a career as a stylist and designer in 1999, when she started her own design business in Los Angeles.

In 2003, Hutson joined ABC TV's Extreme Makeover: Home Edition as a style consultant. She remained a crewmember until the show ended in 2012.

In 2011, Hutson and fellow Extreme Makeover personality Tanya McQueen debuted the show Picker Sisters on Lifetime. The show follows Hutson and McQueen as they travel around the United States in search of antiques and rare collectibles for their home decor store in Los Angeles.

Along with The Design Network, Hutson helps "deserving moms" with their interior design in the video series Momtourage.

== Personal life ==
In December 2003, Hutson was reunited with high school classmate, actor Barry Watson. The couple married on July 14, 2006, in between the births of their two sons, Oliver (born May 2, 2005) and Felix (born November 13, 2007). They separated in 2010.
