= You, Me and Dupree =

2006 film by Anthony Russo and Joe Russo

- Theatrical release poster
- Directed by: Anthony Russo; Joe Russo
- Written by: Michael LeSieur
- Produced by: Scott Stuber; Mary Parent; Owen Wilson
- Starring: Owen Wilson; Kate Hudson; Matt Dillon; Seth Rogen; Amanda Detmer; Michael Douglas
- Cinematography: Charles Minsky
- Edited by: Peter B. Ellis; Debra Neil-Fisher
- Music by: Theodore Shapiro
- Production companies: Avis-Davis Productions; Stuber-Parent Productions
- Distributed by: Universal Pictures (United States); United International Pictures (Germany)
- Release dates: July 14, 2006 (United States); September 21, 2006 (Germany)
- Running time: 109 minutes
- Countries: United States; Germany
- Language: English
- Budget: $54 million
- Box office: $130.6 million

You, Me and Dupree is a 2006 romantic comedy film directed by Anthony Russo and Joe Russo and written by Mike LeSieur. It stars Owen Wilson, Kate Hudson, Matt Dillon, Seth Rogen, Amanda Detmer, Todd Stashwick, and Michael Douglas.

The film revolves around newlyweds Carl and Molly Peterson (Dillon and Hudson). After Carl's best man and best friend, Randolph "Randy" Dupree (Wilson), loses his job and home, the couple allows him to move in, but he overstays his welcome. Meanwhile, protective father Bob Thompson (Douglas) begins to dislike son-in-law Carl and works against him.

You, Me and Dupree was released by Universal Pictures in the United States on July 14, 2006 and by United International Pictures in Germany on September 21, 2006. The film received negative reviews from critics and grossed $130.6 million against a $54 million budget.

== Plot ==
Molly Thompson and Carl Peterson are preparing for their wedding day in Hawaii, until Carl's friend Neil interrupts to say that best man Randolph Dupree is missing. They drive off together to pick up Dupree, who appeared to have hitched a ride with a light plane after landing on the wrong island. A day before the wedding, Molly's father, Bob Thompson, who is also CEO of the company that Carl works for, makes a toast with rude jokes about Carl. Later, at a pre-celebration at a bar, Carl neglects Dupree to be with Molly. Carl and Dupree later make up on the beach, with Dupree apologizing for laughing at Bob's jokes. Carl and Molly get married. Returning to work, Carl is surprised to find that Bob has promoted him to be in charge of a design he proposed, though it had been altered somewhat.

Bob makes absurd requests that proceed to get worse, starting with his drastic reimagining of Carl's new architecture project and that Carl get a vasectomy to prevent any future children with Molly. Before returning home to celebrate his promotion with Molly, Carl stops by the bar, where he finds Neil and Dupree. After Neil leaves, Dupree reveals that he has financial problems, such as being evicted from his home and losing his job and car. Carl and Molly take Dupree into their home, though they are frustrated because he is a disruptive, messy slob. Molly sets up Dupree with a woman at her work, a primary school, who is a Mormon librarian. Dupree agrees, though Molly is shocked to find them having sex when they come home from dinner. Romantic candles that Dupree had set up burn down the front of the living room, and Dupree is kicked out.

Meanwhile, Carl is stressed out from work, though he and Molly find time to go out for dinner. On the way back, they find Dupree sitting on a bench in heavy rain with his belongings. Dupree reveals that the librarian had just dumped him. Feeling pity, Molly insists to a reluctant Carl that they take him back in. Dupree apologizes for being disruptive and agrees to mend his ways. The next day, Dupree makes amends, refurbishing the living room and doing Carl's thank you letters for their wedding gifts, as well as making friends with kids from the block. Dupree cooks a dinner for Molly and Carl, though Carl is late again, so Molly and Dupree start without him. When Carl shows up, he is jealous that the pair were having dinner together and have become friends, and Carl and Molly have a fight. Carl kicks Dupree out, suspecting an affair, which shocks Dupree. The following night, Bob comes over for dinner. Dupree attempts to sneak back into their home to get some of his belongings but falls off the roof. He is found outside and is invited in for dinner, much to Carl's dismay.

After Bob takes a liking to Dupree and asks him to go fishing with him, it enrages Carl because - even though he does not like fishing - it is Bob's way of approving someone. Carl's fury boils over as he then imagines Dupree hanging out with Bob and having sex with Molly, causing Carl to jump across the table and attempt to strangle Dupree. Bob hits Carl over the head with a candlestick shortly after, and Molly kicks Carl out of the house. After returning from the hospital with a neck brace, Dupree and Molly confront Bob about what he really thinks of Carl, and his evasive answers reveal his dislike of him. The next morning, Dupree gets all the local kids to search for Carl. Dupree eventually finds Carl in the bar and convinces him to chase after Molly. Dupree helps Carl break into Bob's office and confront him while Dupree himself distracts and evades a Samoan guard, Paco. Carl and Bob reach an understanding, and Bob expresses his regret over the way he treated him. Dupree and Carl return to the house, where Carl apologizes to Molly and they agree to work things out. Glad that he mended Carl's marriage, Dupree celebrates by leaping into the air with joy until he falls to the ground.

Dupree uses his experiences with Carl and Molly to publish a successful self-help book titled 7 Different Kinds of Smoke: Living, Loving, and Finding your Inner "-ness" and becomes a motivational speaker, with Paco as his assistant. In a post-credits scene, Dupree's hero Lance Armstrong reads Dupree's book and repeats "Lanceness" with various inflections.

== Cast ==
- Owen Wilson as Randolph "Randy" Dupree
- Kate Hudson as Molly Peterson
- Matt Dillon as Carl Peterson
- Michael Douglas as Bob Thompson
- Seth Rogen as Neil
- Amanda Detmer as Annie
- Todd Stashwick as Tony
- Bill Hader as Mark
- Lance Armstrong as himself
- Billy Gardell as Dave the bar keep
- Pat Crawford Brown as Aunt Kathy
- Sidney S. Liufau as Paco
- Harry Dean Stanton as Curly (uncredited)
- Joe Russo as Personal Trainer

== Production ==
The film's production budget totalled $54 million. The scene that has Dupree arriving by plane on the wrong island was shot in Kualoa Ranch, the same valley in which Jurassic Park was filmed. Composer Rolfe Kent scored the film, and at the very last minute—a mere week before the press screenings—his score was replaced by one written by Theodore Shapiro.

In the special features of the film, there is a different version trailer for You, Me and Dupree in which Dupree and Molly are married and Carl moves in. The DVD release of the film also contains a re-cut trailer horror/thriller version of the film.

== Reception ==
=== Box office ===
You, Me and Dupree grossed $75.6 million in the United States and Canada, and $55 million in other territories, for a worldwide total of $130.6 million.

=== Critical response ===
You, Me and Dupree received negative reviews from critics. According to the review aggregator website Rotten Tomatoes, 20% of critics have given the film a positive review based on 166 reviews, with an average rating of 4.3/10. The website's critics consensus reads, "A rather generic entry into the arrested development subgenre, with themes borrowed from other more successful and funnier films. Dupree wears out its welcome." At Metacritic, the film has a weighted average score of 46 out of 100 based on 29 critics, indicating "mixed or average reviews".

Jim Emerson of RogerEbert.com gave the film 2 stars out of 4 and compared the film to many of its predecessors, suggesting Dupree is a "descendant" of Dignan, also played by Wilson, in Bottle Rocket and that the film is at times like a version of Fatal Attraction, but criticized the film for never properly deciding if Dupree is merely unlucky or actually manipulative. He described the film as having what Roger Ebert called the "Idiot Plot", which requires characters to behave in unnatural ways for laughs or to force the plot forward, the comedy equivalent of "Don't go down to the cellar!" in horror movies.

=== Steely Dan response ===
The film's title caused a minor stir since the uncommon name Dupree is the same as the title character in the Steely Dan song "Cousin Dupree" from their 2000 album Two Against Nature, which also concerns a ne'er-do-well relative who becomes a problem houseguest. Steely Dan founders Donald Fagen and Walter Becker wrote a tongue-in-cheek letter to Luke Wilson complaining about his brother Owen Wilson's apparent appropriation of their character's name. The duo invited the elder Wilson to make up for the "theft" of their character's name by coming on stage with them at one of their concerts to apologize to the band's fans. Owen Wilson gave a tongue-in-cheek response to the letter, stating in a press conference, "I have never heard the song 'Cousin Dupree' and I don't even know who this gentleman, Mr. Steely Dan, is. I hope this helps to clear things up and I can get back to concentrating on my new movie, HEY 19."
