= Marilyn Chambers =

American pornographic film actress (1952–2009)

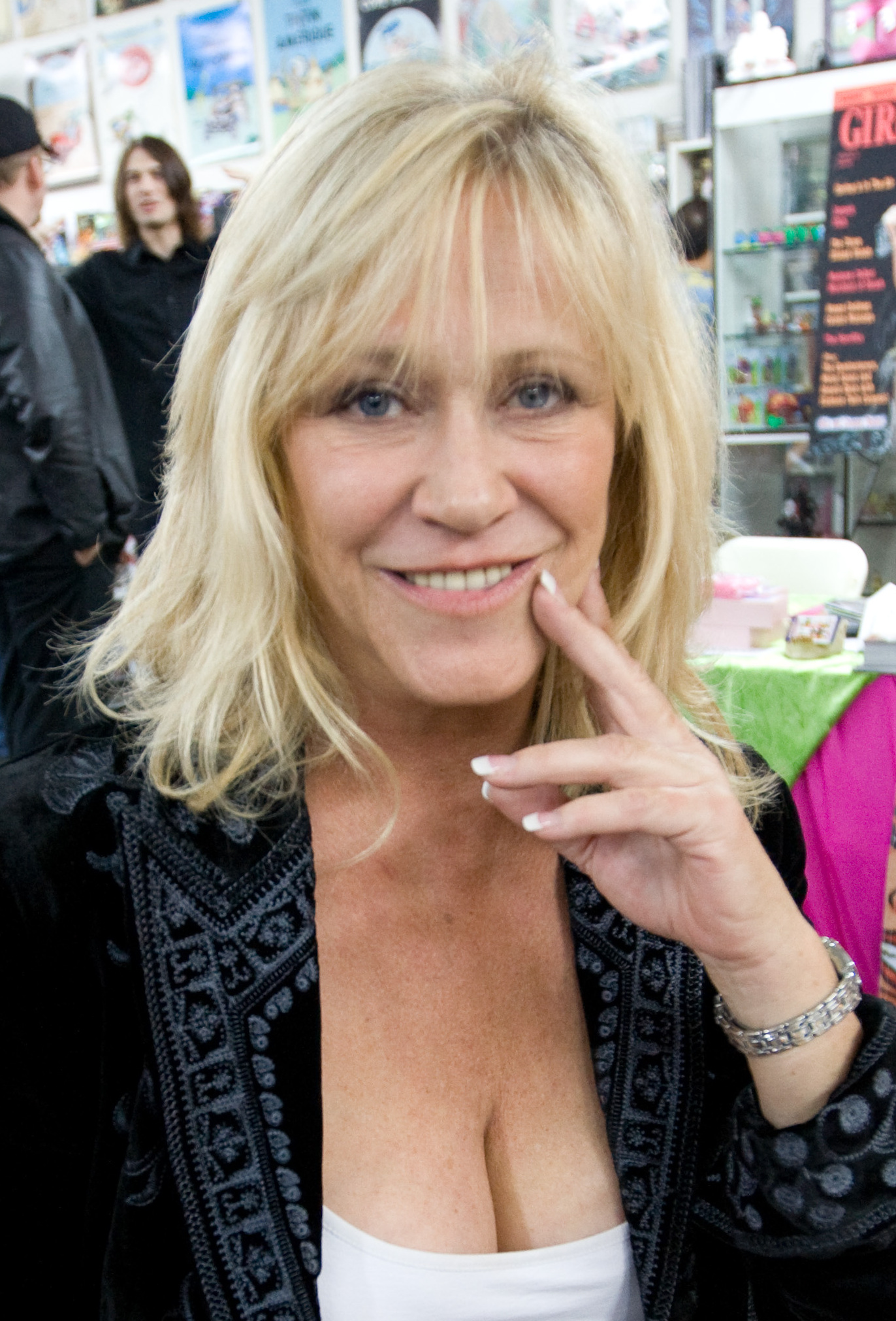
- Chambers in 2008
- Born: Marilyn Ann Briggs; April 22, 1952; Providence, Rhode Island, U.S.
- Died: April 12, 2009 (aged 56); Santa Clarita, California, U.S.
- Resting place: Ashes scattered at sea
- Occupations: Pornographic film actress; exotic dancer; model; actress; singer; vice-presidential candidate
- Height: 5 ft 7 in (170 cm)
- Spouses: Doug Chapin (m. 1971; div. 1974) Chuck Traynor (m. 1975; div. 1985): William Taylor, Jr. (m. 1991/92; div.1994)
- Children: 1

Marilyn Ann Taylor (née Briggs; April 22, 1952 – April 12, 2009), known professionally as Marilyn Chambers, was an American pornographic film actress, exotic dancer, model, actress, singer, and vice-presidential candidate. She was known for her 1972 hardcore film debut, Behind the Green Door, and her 1980 pornographic film Insatiable. She ranked at No. 6 on the list of Top 50 Porn Stars of All Time by AVN, and ranked as one of Playboy's Top 100 Sex Stars of the Century in 1999. Although she was primarily known for her adult film work, she made a successful transition to mainstream projects and has been called "porn's most famous crossover".

== Early life ==
Born Marilyn Ann Briggs in Providence, Rhode Island, Chambers was raised in Westport, Connecticut, in a middle-class household. It is often reported that she was born in Westport; however, in a 2007 interview, Chambers confirmed she was born in Providence but grew up in Westport. Her father was in advertising and her mother was a nurse. She was the youngest of three children, a brother, Bill Briggs (keyboardist for 1960s Boston band The Remains), and a sister, Jann Smith. Chambers attended Burr Farms Elementary School, Hillspoint Elementary School, Long Lots Junior High School, and Staples High School where she graduated in 1970 and was voted "Best Student Body". Her father tried to discourage her from pursuing a modeling career, citing brutal competition. "Ever since I was a little kid, I've always wanted to be an actress," Chambers said in 1997. "I was always a performer, a junior Olympic diver, a junior Olympic gymnast. My mother always told me I was a show-off".

"When I was about 16, I learned how to write my mother's name on notes to get out of school", she said. "And then I'd take the train into the city to go to auditions". While in high school, she landed some modeling assignments and a small role in the film The Owl and the Pussycat (1970), in which Chambers was credited as Evelyn Lang. During her early career as a model, her most prominent job was as the "Ivory Soap girl" on the Ivory Snow soap flake box, posing as a mother holding a baby under the tag line "99 & 44/100% pure".

== Career ==
=== Behind the Green Door ===
Upon the release of The Owl and the Pussycat, Chambers was sent to Los Angeles and San Francisco on a promotional tour. After that, she did not receive any roles except for a low-budget film, writer-director-producer Sean S. Cunningham's Together (1971), in which she appeared nude. In 1970, she moved from Westport to San Francisco, where she held several jobs that included topless model and bottomless dancer. "I moved to San Francisco, thinking it was the entertainment capital of the world, which indeed, it is not," she said.

Chambers sought work in theater and dance groups in San Francisco to no avail. In 1972, she saw an advertisement in the San Francisco Chronicle for a casting call for what was billed as a "major motion picture". She rushed to the audition only to find it was for a pornographic film, which was to be called Behind the Green Door. She was about to leave when producers Artie and Jim Mitchell noticed her resemblance to Cybill Shepherd. They invited her upstairs to their offices and told her the film's plot. Chambers was highly dubious about accepting a role in a pornographic film, fearing it might ruin her chances at breaking into the mainstream. But she was turned on by the fantasy of the story and decided to take a chance, under the condition that she receive a hefty salary and 10 percent of the film's gross. She also insisted that each actor get tested for venereal disease. The Mitchell Brothers balked at her request for a percentage of the film's profits, but finally agreed, realizing the film needed a wholesome blonde actress.

The film told the story of a wealthy San Francisco socialite, Gloria Saunders (Chambers), who is taken against her will to an elite North Beach sex club and loved as she's never been loved before. Unusually, Chambers does not have a single word of dialogue in the entire film. After engaging in lesbian sex with a group of six women, she then has sex with actor Johnnie Keyes. This possibly makes Behind the Green Door the first U.S. feature-length hardcore film to include an interracial sex scene. The porn industry and viewing public were shocked by the then-taboo spectacle of a white woman having sex with a black man. The scene with Keyes is followed by Chambers mounting a trapeze contraption suspended from the ceiling. She then engages in vaginal intercourse with one man as she performs oral sex on another and masturbates two others.

"Each sequence was a surprise to me", she said in 1987. "They never told me what was happening next. I just did it as it happened, and it worked. I've always been highly sexed. Oh, my God, I love it! Insatiable is the right word for me."

After filming concluded, she informed the Mitchell Brothers that she was "the Ivory Snow Girl"; the Mitchells capitalized on this by billing her as the "99 and 44/100% impure" girl. Although she said at the time the film would help "sell a lot more soap", Procter & Gamble quickly dropped her after discovering her double life as an adult-film actress, and the advertising industry was scandalized. The fact that Chambers's image was so well known from Ivory Snow boosted the film's ticket sales, and led to several jokes on television talk shows. Nearly every adult film she made following this incident featured a cameo of her Ivory Snow box.

Chambers was relatively unknown prior to Behind the Green Door; however, the film made her a star. Green Door, along with Deep Throat, released the same year, and The Devil in Miss Jones, ushered in what is commonly known as the porno chic era.

=== Resurrection of Eve and Inside Marilyn Chambers ===
Following Behind the Green Door, the Mitchell Brothers and Chambers teamed up for Resurrection of Eve, released in September 1973. Although not the runaway blockbuster that Green Door was, Eve was a hit and a well-received entry into the porno chic market. It also helped set Chambers apart from her contemporaries Linda Lovelace and Georgina Spelvin as the wholesome, all-American girl next door. Following Eve, Chambers was anxious to transition her fame into other areas of entertainment. At the time, the Mitchell Brothers were still her managers. "They were always talking about some half-assed idea I knew wouldn't come off", Chambers said in 1992. "'Flakes' is a terrible word but they were, in a cute sort of way". Chambers had always considered the brothers as her own brothers but when she abruptly announced that she was leaving them to take up with Chuck Traynor, they were appalled and had a falling out with Chambers.

In retaliation, the brothers created a documentary in 1976 called Inside Marilyn Chambers, which was composed of alternate shots and outtakes from Green Door and Eve, as well as interviews with some of her co-stars. This was done without Chambers's knowledge or approval but when she learned of it just prior to its release, she negotiated a deal that would offer her 10% of the gross as long as she would contribute interviews to the film and promote it nationally. "I hated the film and I still do", she said later. "It's supposed to be the story of my life, and it's not true. Jim and Art ripped me off. They felt I'd betrayed them... I felt they'd betrayed me, and for many years, we didn't speak. Only when money was to be made did we start talking again." Chambers reunited with the Mitchell Brothers in 1979 for two 30-minute features called Beyond de Sade and Never a Tender Moment, which explored BDSM. The films, which were shot at the Mitchell Brothers Theatre, co-starred Erica Boyer.

=== Mainstream crossover ===
==== Hollywood ====
Chambers dreamed of having a career in mainstream films and believed her celebrity as the star of Behind the Green Door and the Ivory Snow girl would be a stepping stone to other endeavors. "The paradox was that, as a result of Green Door, Hollywood blackballed me," she said later. "[Green Door] became a very high-grossing film ... But, to a lot of people, it was still a dirty movie; for me to do anything else, as an actress, was totally out of the question. I became known as a porno star, and that type of labeling really hurt me. It hurt my chances of doing anything else."

Throughout the 1970s, producers of several Hollywood films considered casting her. Her biggest opportunity came in 1976 when it was announced in Variety that she was to star alongside Rip Torn in City Blues, a film about a young hooker defended by a seedy lawyer. The film was to be directed by Nicholas Ray. Ray had never seen Behind the Green Door or even screen-tested Chambers. Instead, the two met and Ray was impressed. "I have a camera in my head," he said, adding that Chambers would "eventually be able to handle anything that the young Katie Hepburn or Bette Davis could." However, the project never came to fruition, in large part due to Ray's alcohol and drug abuse. Ray died in 1979.

Chambers claimed that Jack Nicholson and Art Garfunkel brought her in to talk about a role in the 1978 film Goin' South, then asked her for cocaine and grilled her about whether her orgasms in Behind the Green Door were real; she was angered to the point where she stormed out of the interview. She was going to be cast in the film Hardcore, opposite George C. Scott, but the casting director took one look at her and said she was too wholesome to be cast as a porn queen. "The Hardcore people wanted a woman with orange hair who chews gum, swings a big purse, and wears stiletto heels. That's such a cliche," Chambers said years later. Season Hubley was cast instead.

==== Rabid ====
Chambers won the starring role in film director David Cronenberg's low-budget Canadian movie, Rabid, which was released in 1977. Cronenberg stated that he wanted to cast Sissy Spacek in the film lead, but the studio vetoed his choice because of her accent. The director says that the idea of casting Chambers came from producer Ivan Reitman, who had heard that Chambers was looking for a mainstream role. Reitman felt that it would be easier to market the film in different territories if the well-known porn star portrayed the main character. Cronenberg stated that Chambers put in a lot of hard work on the film and that he was impressed with her. Cronenberg further states he had not seen Behind the Green Door prior to casting her.

"It was great working with David," Chambers said in a 1997 interview. "He taught me a lot of things that were very valuable as an actress, especially in horror films. I found it useful in sex films, too!"

==== Theater work ====
In 1974, she starred in the dinner theater production of The Mind With the Dirty Man in Las Vegas and received favorable reviews for her work. The play ran for 52 weeks which, at the time, was the longest-running play in Vegas history, and the mayor gave Chambers the key to the city. In 1976, she starred in a short-lived musical revue off-Broadway called Le Bellybutton. In 1977, she starred in Neil Simon's Last of the Red Hot Lovers in Vegas. The one-woman show Sex Surrogate, in 1979, caused controversy in Las Vegas as it featured full-frontal nudity, which was banned from all major hotel casino showrooms. In 1983, the play was spun off into a 26-part syndicated soap opera called Love Ya, Florence Nightingale. It was broadcast on cable television channels such as the Playboy Channel.

==== Singing career ====
Chambers had some chart success with the disco single "Benihana" in 1976, produced by Michael Zager on the Roulette Records label. Billboard magazine said, "She... sings quite nicely in a sexy little voice in this catchy disco tribute to an oriental lover man." The song is played in the background of one scene in the film Rabid. In Insatiable, she sang the theme song, "Shame On You," which plays over the opening credits. She did the same for the song, "Still Insatiable", which was used in her comeback in the 1999 adult film of the same name. She also sang vocals in the 1983 X-rated film, Up 'n' Coming, in which she plays a rising country music star. In the early 1980s, she was the lead singer of a country and western band called Haywire.

==== Published works ====
Chambers wrote an autobiography, My Story, in 1975, and co-authored Xaviera Meets Marilyn Chambers with Xaviera Hollander in 1977. Both were published by Warner Communications. She also wrote a sex advice column in the mid-to-late 1970s for Genesis magazine called "Private Chambers", and one for Club magazine throughout the 1980s called "State of the Nation". In 1981, she released a book of sex positions and tips called Sensual Secrets. One of the male models featured in the photos with Marilyn was a young Ron Jeremy. The same year, she released another sex manual called The Illustrated Kama Sutra.

==== Insatiable and return to porn ====
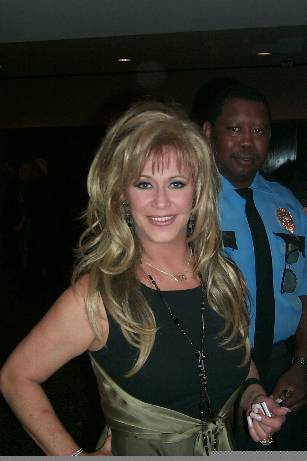
Chambers attending a Sin City film studio party, 1999

Although she had tried for several years to shed her image as a porn star, Chambers returned to the adult film industry with 1980's Insatiable. In the film, she played actress, model, and heiress Sandra Chase, whose appetite for sex is, as the title suggests, insatiable. Sandra is getting ready to make a movie and her manager, played by Jessie St. James, is working on getting some big names to appear alongside Sandra. The story is told in a series of flashbacks which detail Sandra's sexual encounters.

"My manager had never really wanted me to do X-rated film[s]," she said in 1997. "He tried to move me out of that, but—seeing as things didn't go that way, and I wasn't getting any legitimate projects—it was something that we needed to do. I was known in the X-rated business, and it was the right time. It was a cool story and the budget was going to be a lot higher; there were going to be helicopters and Ferraris. It was going to be very classy. There were some names in it that would be good for the box office, [including John Holmes] and that was at a time when X-films were still playing in theaters."

The bet paid off. Insatiable was the top-selling adult video in the U.S. from 1980 to 1982 and it was inducted in the XRCO Hall of Fame. It was followed by a sequel, Insatiable II in 1984. Another X-rated film, Up 'n' Coming, was released in 1983. She also released six direct-to-video features in the early 1980s called Marilyn Chambers' Private Fantasies, in which she acted out her own sexual fantasies alongside some of the biggest names in the industry. The scenarios and dialogue for the series were written by Chambers. Despite her return to the adult-film world, Chambers dreamed of launching a successful mainstream acting career, but was unable to do so.

Chambers left the pornography business because of the increasing fear of AIDS. In 1999, Chambers returned to San Francisco to perform at the Mitchell Brothers' O'Farrell Theatre. Mayor Willie Brown proclaimed a "Marilyn Chambers Day" for her unique place in San Francisco history, and praised her for her "artistic presence", her "vision", and her "energy". That same year Chambers returned to adult features with a trio of films made for VCA Pictures called Still Insatiable (1999), Dark Chambers (2000), and Edge Play (2000), each directed by Veronica Hart. In 2000, Tracy Hutson played Chambers in the biographical television film Rated X that included Chambers's strip-club career.

Near the end of her career, Chambers appeared primarily in independent films, including her last role in Solitaire. Chambers claimed that the more laid-back pace of these roles suited her as "there's a lot less pressure on you to perform [and] you don't have to be young and skinny". Among these were Bikini Bistro, Angel of H.E.A.T. (with Mary Woronov), Party Incorporated, and Breakfast in Bed.

In a 2004 interview, Chambers said, "My advice to somebody who wants to go into adult films is: absolutely not! It's heart-breaking. It leaves you kind of empty. So have a day job and don't quit it".

== 1985 arrests ==
On February 1, 1985, while performing her nude act at the "Cine-Stage" within the Mitchell Brothers O'Farrell Theatre in San Francisco, Chambers was arrested by the vice squad and charged with committing a lewd act in a public place and soliciting prostitution. It was alleged by plainclothes policemen who were in the audience that Chambers allowed audience members to touch her with their hands and mouths during her show called "Feel the Magic". She was released on $2,000 bail and the charges were later dropped. "I've never been arrested in my life for anything, ever, so this is kind of a big shock to me, not only as a performer but as a human being", Chambers said at the time. "It's a heartbreaker. This is supposed to be a hip city. I really love—make that LOVED—this city. These people have been my fans for years, and it's a thrill for them to touch me up close. There's nothing illegal if I'm not taking money."

Chambers's attorney claimed that Chambers was used "as a pawn in a struggle over control of adult businesses." Chambers's arrest came three days before the Board of Supervisors were to vote on a proposed ordinance to eliminate police permits for adult bookstores and theaters. In the wake of her arrest, the Board stripped police of their power to license the city's adult theaters. "The O'Farrell was packed the day after we were arrested," Chambers said later. "And they put the mayor's phone number up on the marquee—'Call Mayor Dianne Feinstein'... I'm in jail with my fur coat and nothing else on, and [the police officers] want to take pictures. I took a mug shot with every cop in the place, and they're going, 'I'm really sorry we had to do this.' And the next night they were all back enjoying the show".

Later that year on December 13, 1985, she was arrested during a performance at Stage Door Johnny's, a strip club in Cleveland. Police said she was nude except for her shoes and was having sexual contact with an audience member. She was charged with promoting prostitution and was held in jail until she was freed on a $1,000 bond. Chambers denied the charge, saying, "I did the same show I've been doing for the last six years. Police just happened to be in the audience." In November 2012, the mugshots from Chambers's Cleveland arrest sold on eBay for $202.50.

== Efforts in politics ==
In the 2004 United States presidential election, Chambers ran for vice president on the Personal Choice Party ticket, a libertarian political party. She received a total of 946 votes. In the 2008 United States presidential election, she was again Charles Jay's running mate, this time as an alternate write-in candidate to his primary national Boston Tea Party running mate Thomas L. Knapp in the states of Arkansas, Hawaii, Louisiana, Nevada, New Mexico, Oklahoma, South Carolina, South Dakota, and Utah.

== Personal life ==
Chambers was married three times. Her first marriage was to Doug Chapin, whom she met while he was playing bagpipes for money on the streets of San Francisco. They married in 1971. She divorced Chapin in 1974 and married Chuck Traynor, who had recently been divorced from Linda Lovelace. He also became her manager and they were together for ten years.

In the mid-1980s, Chambers was "on her way to an early grave, consuming massive amounts of alcohol and cocaine daily when she met her husband-to-be", William Taylor, Jr., a truck driver, on a blind date. After their first date, he called her to say that he could not see her because he was a recovering heroin addict. Chambers got so angry that she kicked a wall and broke her leg. Taylor came to visit Chambers in the hospital and, upon her release, they began a romance and Chambers entered Narcotics Anonymous. The couple married around 1991 or 1992 and had one child before divorcing in 1994. When Chambers became clean and sober in the early 1990s, her Lexus had a vanity plate that read "LUV NA".

== Death ==
On April 12, 2009, Chambers was found dead in her home near Santa Clarita, California. She was 56 years old. She was discovered by her teenage daughter. The LA County Coroner's autopsy revealed that Chambers died of a cerebral hemorrhage caused by an aneurysm related to heart disease. The Associated Press reported she was survived by her daughter, sister, and brother. Her ashes were scattered at sea.

== Partial filmography ==
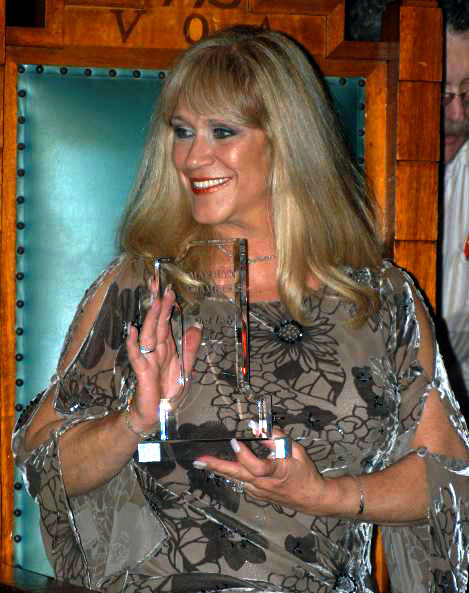
Chambers holding her 2005 Lifetime Achievement FOXE Award

- 1970 The Owl and the Pussycat as Barney's Girl (credited as Evelyn Lang)
- 1971 Together as Herself (credited as Marilyn Briggs)
- 1972 Behind the Green Door as Gloria Saunders
- 1973 Resurrection of Eve as Eve
- 1976 Inside Marilyn Chambers as Herself
- 1977 Rabid as Rose
- 1980 Insatiable as Sandra Chase
- 1981 Scared to Death as uncredited victim
- 1982 Electric Blue - The Movie as Herself
- 1982 My Therapist as Kelly Carson
- 1983 Up 'n' Coming as Cassie Harland
- 1983 Angel of H.E.A.T. as Angel Harmony
- 1984 Insatiable II as Sandra Chase
- 1989 Party Incorporated as Marilyn Saunders
- 1994 Bedtime Fantasies as Herself
- 1994 New York Nights as Barbara Lowery
- 1999 Marilyn Chambers' All Nude Peep Show as Herself
- 1999 Still Insatiable as Senator Charlotte Ballworth
- 2000 Dark Chambers as Dr. Ivory Hasmore
- 2000 Edge Play as Lauren Tanner
- 2007 Stash as Mrs. Bookenlacher
- 2008 Solitaire as Cop
- 2009 Porndogs: The Adventures of Sadie as Sadie (voice)

== Awards ==
- AVN Hall of Fame
- XRCO Hall of Fame
- 1980 Golden Age of Porn Walk of Fame
- 1985 XRCO Award – Best Kinky Scene -Insatiable II (with Jamie Gillis)
- 1992 Adult Film Association of America – Lifetime Achievement Award
- 1992 Free Speech Coalition – Lifetime Achievement Award
- 1998 Porn Block of Fame
- 2005 FOXE Award – Lifetime Achievement
- 2008 XBIZ Award – Lifetime Achievement for a Female Performer

== See also ==
- Golden Age of Porn
