= Tanya McQueen =

American reality television personality (born 1972)

- Born: Tanya McQueen; February 18, 1972 (age 54); Texas, United States
- Occupation: Interior designer
- Years active: 2005-present

Tanya McQueen (born February 18, 1972) is an American reality television personality and interior designer on the reality television series Extreme Makeover: Home Edition. She made her debut on Extreme Makeover in an October 2005 episode titled "The Teas Family".

McQueen graduated from Texas A&M. She owns a home in Nantucket, Massachusetts that is a converted 1800s dairy barn.

Prior to her Extreme Makeover: Home Edition career, she lived in Columbus, Texas. In addition to acting, she and her cousin were flipping real estate (persons who purchase rundown houses at deep discounts, repair them, and resell them for profit) operating under the name "Tattered Hydrangea". She was featured on TLC Network's show "Property Ladder", where an ABC producer noticed McQueen and offered her the chance to join the Extreme Makeover Home Edition team.

In 2009, McQueen hosted the series Hitched or Ditched on the CW Network.

On August 2, 2011, McQueen and fellow Extreme Makeover alum Tracy Hutson debuted the show Picker Sisters on Lifetime.
