= Behind the Green Door =

1972 film by Mitchell brothers

- Theatrical release poster
- Directed by: Artie Mitchell; Jim Mitchell
- Screenplay by: Artie Mitchell
- Based on: Behind the Green Door short story
- Produced by: Artie Mitchell
- Starring: Marilyn Chambers
- Cinematography: Jon Fontana
- Edited by: Jon Fontana
- Music by: Daniel Le Blanc
- Distributed by: Mitchell Brothers Film Group
- Release date: December 17, 1972
- Running time: 72 minutes
- Country: United States
- Language: English
- Budget: $60,000
- Box office: $50 million

Behind the Green Door is a 1972 American pornographic film, widely considered one of the genre's "classic" pictures and one of the films that ushered in the Golden Age of Porn (1969–1984). Featuring Marilyn Chambers, who became a mainstream celebrity, it was one of the first hardcore films widely released in the United States and the feature-length directorial debut of the Mitchell brothers.

Behind the Green Door was adapted from an anonymous short story of the same title, which was circulated by means of numerous carbon copies. The story's title references the 1956 hit song "Green Door", whose lyrics describe being denied entry to a raucous nightclub with a green door. Though she plays the central character, Chambers does not have a single word of dialogue. The film is possibly the first feature-length American heterosexual hardcore feature to include an interracial sex scene.

== Plot ==
The manager of a diner asks two of his regular customers to tell him a supposedly true story that they had previously mentioned to him, involving a "green door". The rest of the movie appears to be a dramatization of the story's events, although no off-screen narration is heard.

After arriving at a North Beach hotel for an apparent vacation, a wealthy San Francisco socialite, Gloria Saunders (Chambers), is taken against her will to an elite sex club and "loved as she's never been loved before". She has sex with a group of six women, all dressed in black, after being brought out wearing a white dress on stage through the green door.

The silent, largely masked audience become increasingly aroused as her white dress is removed and she is stroked, kissed and receives cunnilingus by the women. Her first heterosexual sex is with the African-American boxer Johnnie Keyes, accompanied by a funk soundtrack. He gives her more cunnilingus, and then they have vaginal intercourse, while Gloria continues to be stroked by the other women. When she has an orgasm, the sex stops, and he is not shown to ejaculate.

Gloria then mounts a trapeze contraption suspended from the ceiling and then engages in vaginal intercourse with one man as she performs oral sex on another and manual sex on two others. The audience become further aroused and begin having sex with each other in what becomes an orgy. In a psychedelic key sequence, an ejaculation is shown with semen flying through the air for almost seven minutes. The film features several multicolored, optically printed, slow-motion close-ups of money shots. This is the only ejaculation sequence in the film. The narrator then runs from the audience, onto the stage, and carries Gloria off, through the green door. The film ends with him and Gloria making love alone.

== Impact ==
Three years after Andy Warhol's seminal Blue Movie in 1969, and along with Deep Throat, also released in 1972, Behind the Green Door helped launch the "Golden Age of Porn" (1969–1984), and somewhat later, the "porno chic" boom. Along with Deep Throat, it was one of the first hardcore porn film to reach a mass mixed-sex audience. Prior to Behind the Green Door, most of the Mitchell Brothers' 200 or so films had only been shown in their O'Farrell Theater. Made with a budget of $60,000, it achieved a nationwide theatrical release which earned more than $1 million. The movie ultimately grossed more than $50 million including its video release, which was controlled exclusively by the Mitchells out of their headquarters in the O'Farrell Theatre, San Francisco. It was one of the biggest box office pornographic successes of the 1970s, alongside Deep Throat and The Devil in Miss Jones. It was even screened at the Cannes Film Festival. After its release, organized crime figures used extortion in an attempt to obtain the rights to the film.

Chambers was relatively unknown at the time; however, the film made her a star. Immediately prior to the movie's release she had been the "Ivory soap girl", modeling for the Ivory Snow soap and detergent packaging holding a baby. The Mitchell brothers appropriated the brand's slogan "99 and 44/100% pure" to describe Chambers in press releases. After the release of the movie, the advertising industry was scandalized, and Procter & Gamble recalled all products and advertising materials featuring Chambers, unintentionally adding to the movie's hype. Procter & Gamble subsequently required of all of their advertising agencies that they thoroughly screen the background of any female model employed for print advertisements or commercials. That Chambers's image was so well known from Ivory Snow boosted the film's ticket sales, and led to several jokes on television talk shows.

== Critical reception ==
Upon its release, the film received some positive reviews in mainstream media. Roger Ebert of The Chicago Sun-Times gave the film a negative review, writing that despite Chambers's beauty the film's lack of character development and the focus on "proving how dirty it was" were major detractions. A review of the film in Variety noted that Chambers "does everything, quite realistically. Unfortunately, she never has enough to say to judge whether she qualifies as an actress."

According to writer Peter Michelson, there is "a relatively small corpus of pornographic films – e.g., Deep Throat, The Devil in Miss Jones, and Behind the Green Door – that have a minimal but still sufficient artistic interest to distinguish themselves from the rest of the genre", and the film is "more artful than most smut films". It was the second film to be inducted into the XRCO Hall of Fame, following Deep Throat.

== Legal troubles ==
The Supreme Court's 1973 Miller v. California decision adversely affected the mainstream release of porn films, including Behind the Green Door. The Miller decision redefined obscenity from that of “utterly without socially redeeming value” to that which lacks "serious literary, artistic, political, or scientific value" and substituted contemporary community standards for national standards, as some prior tests required. Miller continued to hold that obscenity was not protected by the First Amendment, which gave leeway to local judges to seize and destroy prints of films adjudged to violate local community standards. When Behind the Green Door opened in Suffolk County, New York in 1973, it – along with the porn film The New Comers – was successfully prosecuted. In addition to New York, Behind the Green Door was banned in California, Colorado, and Georgia.

== Later films ==
In 1986, the Mitchells made a sequel, Behind the Green Door: the Sequel, directed by cabaret singer Sharon McNight. The movie featured no famous performers, and starred Elisa Florez, billed as Missy Manners. (Florez was Artie Mitchell's girlfriend at the time, and she reportedly demanded the role from him.) It was one of the first "safe sex"-themed porn films, following the onset of the AIDS epidemic in the 1980s, with the performers using condoms and other protection. It was a critical and commercial disaster, and the Mitchells lost hundreds of thousands of dollars. The O'Farrell Theatre, which closed in 2020, contained a "Green Door Room" named for the two movies and was the principal set of the sequel.

In 2012, adult film company Vivid Entertainment produced a loose remake titled The New Behind the Green Door. This film stars Brooklyn Lee as the main character Hope, a wealthy young woman drawn into a seedy underworld while on an erotic journey to find her birth mother. The movie includes footage of the original Behind the Green Door, as Hope describes a sexual fantasy that recalls the plot of the 1972 film. Other cast members include Dana DeArmond, Penny Pax, Bailey Blue, Steven St. Croix, and James Deen, with appearances by original cast member Johnnie Keyes and Marilyn Chambers's daughter McKenna Taylor.

== In popular culture ==
- In the 1981 road-race comedy The Cannonball Run, the driver of the Japanese team (played by Jackie Chan) attempts to watch a VHS tape of Behind the Green Door on an in-dash monitor while driving on a rural highway. After several near-collisions due to his distracted driving, his partner in the back seat wakes up and forces him to shut it off.
- One of the "Coming Attractions" previewed in The Kentucky Fried Movie is Catholic High School Girls in Trouble, which is described as "more shocking than Behind the Green Door."
- The production of the movie is dramatized in the 2000 film Rated X, starring brothers Charlie Sheen and Emilio Estevez as Artie and Jim Mitchell.
- Actor Idris Elba's choice to name his production company Green Door Productions (because "I like doors and green is my favorite color") was questioned because of the association of the phrase with this film. He was intrigued to learn that it was one of the first porn films to feature interracial sex, and that it featured a seven-minute ejaculation sequence, which only made him want the name more, so that he could say that he'd chosen the name "Because it took a long time to come."
- In 2024, when promoting Ricky Stanicky, John Cena jokingly cited Behind the Green Door as his favorite guilty pleasure movie of all time.

== See also ==
- List of American films of 1972
- List of cult films
