= Dirt Merchant =

- Directed by: B.J. Nelson
- Written by: B.J. Nelson
- Produced by: B.J. Nelson; David Peipers; Ed Sanders; Clifford E. Wright
- Starring: Danny Masterson; Julie Benz
- Cinematography: Ken Blakey
- Edited by: Karen Weintraub; Alan Roberts (Uncredited)
- Music by: Jamie James
- Distributed by: Quantum Entertainment
- Release date: September 19, 1999
- Running time: 85 minutes
- Country: United States
- Language: English

Dirt Merchant is an independent comedy film that premiered on SightSound.com on September 19, 1999, and premiered on DVD on June 11, 2002. The film was written and directed by B.J. Nelson, and stars Danny Masterson and Julie Benz. It is notable for adult film actress Jenna Jameson's first mainstream appearance. It was filmed in Los Angeles, California, and originally titled My Name is Dirt.

== Plot ==
Dirt Merchant is a young man who struggles finding a job after getting fired from the mailroom at a record company where he dreamed of becoming assistant director. Eventually he becomes a summons server but gets in trouble when a rock star overdoses and he is framed for murdering him. He has to solve the case and deal with his feelings for his ex-girlfriend Angie while also dealing with the rock star's porn star girlfriend Holly So Tightly.

== Cast ==
- Danny Masterson as Dirt Merchant
- Julie Benz as Angie
- Jenna Jameson as Holly 'So Tightly'
- David DeLuise as Sly
- David Faustino as 'Sponge'
- Anthony Michael Hall as Jeffry Alan Spacy
- Brion James as Detective Harry Ball
- Tim Thomerson as Jack
- Lee Arenberg as James Earl
- Carlos Alazraqui as Ronny Orlando
- David "Shark" Fralick as Sergeant Sampson
- Lisa Kushell as XTV Reporter
- Elon Gold as Blood Banker
- Kirsten Holmquist as Receptionist
- Simon Brook as Rock Star
- Wade Carpenter as Johnny Decay
- Suzanne DeLaurentis as Jake's Secretary
- Anne Getty as Poetry Girl
- Nicholle Ginette as Janelle
- Dale Godboldo as Zeke, The Greek
- Dawn Heusser as Karate Nurse
- Tommy Hinkley as Mort Huskins
- Sidney S. Liufau as 'El Nino'
- Vanessa Rooke as Hemp Girl
- Clifford E. Wright as The Masked Maniac
