= Kirsten Kemp =

English actress

- Born: Kirsten Holmquist; August 27, 1970 (age 54); London, England
- Occupation(s): Film, television actress, interior designer

Kirsten Kemp Becker (born August 27, 1970) is an English actress and television presenter.

== Biography ==
Born Kirsten Holmquist in London, England, she began to sing, dance, and play flute and guitar with her parents at the age of four when they moved to Mexico City, Mexico. They performed American musical comedy and operetta throughout Mexico, Central and South America, sponsored by the U.S. State Department. Upon moving to Los Angeles, United States at age 13, she began to get roles on TV shows such as Saved by the Bell, where she played the lanky, tomboyish Rhonda Robistelli.

Kemp later appeared on an episode of Herman's Head playing Tawny, a potential love interest of Herman's. On this appearance she wore a black leotard and spoke with a more feminine voice than her earlier characters, an attempt to have her cast as more attractive and feminine than the characters of her adolescence.

Kemp is trilingual, speaking Spanish, French, and English. She was the host of the show Property Ladder which ran on the TLC Network for three seasons, 2005–2007. Property Ladder was cancelled after the housing market cooled.

After Property Ladder, Kirsten Kemp Becker hosted the TLC program Hope for Your Home, which ran for one season. She was referred to as a "real estate expert" in the context of her real estate and home improvement programs.

She currently owns and operates Becker Studios in Santa Barbara along with her husband Darrell Becker.

== Filmography ==
- Shout (Voice, 1991)
- Clifford (1994)
- Entertaining Angels: The Dorothy Day Story (1996)
- Anarchy TV (1998)
- My Beautiful Me (1998)
- Dirt Merchant (1999)

=== Television ===
- Saved by the Bell (3 episodes, 1989)
- Head of the Class (3 episodes, 1989–1991)
- Growing Pains (1 episode, 1991)
- Evening Shade (2 episodes, 1991–1993)
- Dream On (1 episode, 1993)
- The Adventures of Brisco County, Jr. (1 episode, 1993)
- Herman's Head (1 episode, 1993)
- Getting By (1 episode, 1993)
- Burke's Law (1 episode, 1994)
- Married... with Children (1 episode, 1994)
- Mad About You (1 episode, 1995)
- Ed McBain's 87th Precinct: Lightning (1995)
- Thunder Alley (1 episode, 1995)
- Misery Loves Company (1 episode, 1995)
- Hudson Street (1 episode, 1995)
- Dave's World (1 episode, 1995)
- Sister, Sister (1 episode, 1996)
- Goode Behavior (1 episode, 1997)
- JAG (1 episode, 1998)
- Mike Hammer, Private Eye (2 episodes, 1998)
- The Simple Life (1 episode, 1998)
- Providence (1 episode, 2002)
- Hope for Your Home
