= Property Ladder (TV series) =

UK television series

Property Ladder is the name of two television shows from the United Kingdom and United States where first-time property or real-estate developers purchase houses (usually in need of repair), renovate them, and attempt to sell them (or flip) for a profit. Their efforts (and frustrations) are the featured bit of the show. An expert property developer steps in to provide advice.

== Original UK version ==
Property Ladder
- Starring: Sarah Beeny
- Country of origin: United Kingdom

Production
- Production company: Talkback Thames

Original release
- Network: Channel 4

The original UK version of the show is produced by Talkback Thames and airs on Channel 4, with repeats frequently shown on various channels including Discovery Real Time. Sarah Beeny features as the expert property developer, and is noted as appearing both pregnant and not pregnant at least once in each episode. The show underwent a change in format during 2004 and now features two developments per episode rather than one. In 2009, the UK version was re-titled Property Snakes & Ladders, reflecting the increasing jeopardy for would-be developers in a falling market.

The UK version has also aired in Australia on The Lifestyle Channel. When the retitled show Property Snakes & Ladders was shown in Australia the original title Property Ladder (with the original title sequence) was retained by The Lifestyle Channel to retain its audience.

== US version ==
Property Ladder
- Starring: Kirsten Kemp
- Country of origin: United States

Original release
- Network: TLC
- Release: June 2005

The US version is produced by TLC, with Kirsten Kemp as the expert property developer. The show premiered in June 2005.

An episode featured Tanya McQueen and her cousin as flippers operating out of Columbus, Texas. That episode was noticed by ABC producers, who invited McQueen to join the Extreme Makeover: Home Edition design team.

Another episode featured Tom Wozniak and John Skandamis on their 2nd flip. It was filmed in Orlando, Florida and the title was "Feuding Friends and the Demo Debacle".

== Dutch edition ==
The UK edition is also broadcast in the Netherlands on RTL 4, which also broadcasts a Dutch edition of the series, called Bouwval gezocht (Ruin Wanted) which is hosted by Peter van der Vorst (2013 series: Irene Moors).

This version of the show is not based on profit, but on people fixing up a bought home for their own way of living, though the results of the renovation are still valuated by real estate agents as a loss or a profit.
