= Johnnie Keyes =

American pornographic actor (1940– 2018)

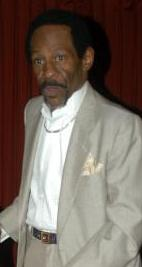
- Keyes at the 2005 FOXE Awards
- Born: February 21, 1940; Cleveland, Ohio, U.S.
- Died: June 3, 2018 (aged 78); Seattle, Washington, U.S.
- Other name: Johnny Keyes
- Children: 1

Johnnie Keyes (February 21, 1940 – June 3, 2018) was an American pornographic film actor best known for appearing in the 1972 film Behind the Green Door. He has been inducted into the AVN, Urban X, and XRCO Halls of Fame.

== Early life ==
Keyes was born in Cleveland, Ohio. He studied at both the School for Theatrical Arts in New York and the Juilliard School.

== Career ==
Keyes had a lead role in Behind the Green Door (1972). He also performed in films in the Swedish Erotica series during the 1980s. In addition to his work in adult film, Keyes starred in musicals and the theater, was a boxer, a singer, and a sex surrogate. He was a part of the documentary, After Porn Ends 2.

At the inaugural Urban X Awards, Keyes was inducted into their Hall of Fame. In 2013, Keyes made a cameo in The New Behind the Green Door, a loose remake of Behind the Green Door that featured archival footage from the original film.

Keyes is a member of the AVN and XRCO Halls of Fame.

== Death ==
On June 3, 2018, Keyes died in Seattle following complications from a recent stroke.

== Select appearances ==
Year	Title	Role	Notes	Ref.
1972	Behind the Green Door	African Stud		
1973	Resurrection of Eve	Himself	Credited as "Johnny Keyes"	
1974	Space Is the Place		Uncredited	
1975	Sodom and Gomorrah: The Last Seven Days	Birsha King of Gomorrah		
1975	Inside Marilyn Chambers	Himself	Documentary; credited as "Johnny Keyes"	
1976	Femmes de Sade	Guy at Party	Uncredited	
1978	Sex World	Himself		
1981	Aunt Peg's Fulfillment	Tyrone Tipps	Credited as "Johny Keyes"	
2013	The New Behind the Green Door	Himself	Cameo	
2014	X-Rated: The Greatest Adult Movies of All Time	Himself	Documentary	
2017	After Porn Ends 2	Himself		
