= The New Comers =

1973 film by Lloyd Kaufman

- Directed by: Lloyd Kaufman
- Written by: Lloyd Kaufman
- Produced by: Lloyd Kaufman
- Starring: Jamie Gillis; Harry Reems; Georgina Spelvin
- Release date: 1973
- Running time: 70 minutes
- Country: United States

The New Comers (also released as Seven Delicious Wishes) is a 1973 pornographic film written, produced, and directed by Lloyd Kaufman, and starring Jamie Gillis, Harry Reems, and Georgina Spelvin. The film was banned in New York City for violating state obscenity statutes.

The film was part of the porno chic wave of the Golden Age of Porn, and had the distinction of being reviewed in Variety before its release.

The trend towards the mainstreaming of porn in neighborhood theaters was inhibited by the Supreme Court's 1973 Miller v. California decision, which redefined obscenity from that of “utterly without socially redeeming value” to that that lacks "serious literary, artistic, political, or scientific value" and substituted contemporary community standards for national standards, as some prior tests required. Miller continued to hold that obscenity was not protected by the First Amendment, which gave leeway to local judges to seize and destroy prints of films adjudged to violate local community standards. When The New Comers opened in New York City in 1973, it was successfully prosecuted along with Behind the Green Door and banned.

== Synopsis ==
The lecturer invites his students to his home and then begins to educate them sexually, conducting various experiments.

== See also ==
- List of American films of 1973
