= Sodom and Gomorrah: The Last Seven Days =

1975 pornographic film by the Mitchell brothers

Sodom and Gomorrah: The Last Seven Days is a 1975 pornographic comedy film directed and produced by the Mitchell brothers, set in biblical times. It is loosely based on the biblical Sodom and Gomorrah, with a subplot where extraterrestrial aliens observe Earth. The space captain of their ship has the physical appearance of a chimpanzee and speaks with a voice which imitates John Wayne. The picture had a budget of one million dollars, and the soundtrack was created by Mike Bloomfield and Barry Goldberg. Nevertheless, it was a huge flop at the box office.

== Plot ==
Lot and his family move to Sodom, where king Bera rules. He hopes to start a life as a merchant, but is instead confronted with the strange laws of the city, which forbid vaginal intercourse. Meanwhile, the events are witnessed by an extraterrestrial spaceship which has a monkey for a captain.

== Cast ==
- Priscilla Alden - Townsperson
- Tom Bowden - Townsperson
- Sean Brancato - King Bera
- Deborah Brast - Leah 1
- Jacquie Brodie - Milcah
- Tom Carlton - Townsperson
