= Les Nickelettes =

Feminist satirical performance art troupe

Les Nickelettes were a feminist satirical performance art troupe from San Francisco, California.

== History ==
Les Nickelettes were created by a group of women experimental theatre artists from San Francisco State University in 1972. Started as a lark, first becoming vaudevillian cheerleaders at the Peoples' Nickelodeon midnight shows the group quickly evolved into a cutting edge feminist satirical performance art troupe. Women were eager to join and because there were no auditions, entrance requirements, leaders, structure or rules, all women, experienced performers or novices, were welcome to take part in the free artistic expression of pure unfettered female humor. The group became "Virgins in Residence" at the Intersection for the Arts Theatre in 1973 and 1974 performing 30 minute improv musical shows before the scheduled Charlie Chaplin and Betty Boop movies. As female urban guerrillas Les Nickelettes were also involved in feminist stunts such as showing up at the infamous Condor topless night club on Broadway in North Beach dressed in Brownies/Girl Scouts uniforms adorned with plastic breasts demanding to perform on Carol Doda's stage. The troupe also crashed the 1973 opening of the San Francisco Opera. The San Francisco Chronicle society pages described their appearance; "Stealing the show ... were bizarrely dressed non-ticket holders who hopped out of a van." The group's message was that the media only paid attention to entrances.

Evolving a more structured format the group created an original cabaret revue and was the first New Wave act to play at the famed Fab Mab then known as the Mabuhay Gardens dinner club in 1975.

The members of the group stabilized and, with a full commitment to the collective vision of a female led theatre group, decided to write a scripted play. In 1976 Les Nickelettes, Inc. became a non-profit organization and produced its first full-length musical comedy play; Peter Pan: A New Rock Fairytale. The group continued to write and produce plays: 1978: Curtains! a murder mystery musical, 1980: Spaced Out an intergalactic musical comedy play. The Gong Show episode featuring a performance by Les Nickelettes aired November 1, 1979. The troupe scored a perfect 10 but was beaten to first place by a disco act. In 1981 Les Nickelettes collaborated with underground comic book artist Diane Noomin to create an original musical play based on her character Didi Glitz: I'd Rather Be Doing Something Else - The Didi Glitz Story. In 1982 Les Nickelettes traveled to New York City and presented the cabaret/theatre show Anarchy In High Heels, a compilation of skits and songs from their previous shows. In 1985 the group produced the last Les Nickelette full-length production: Oh Goddess! a spiritual musical comedy play.

Les Nickelettes were part of a '70s and '80s San Francisco phenomenon of women's theatre companies. Born from the second wave of feminism, there arose a desire to express a unique feminine humor and perspective. All aspects of play development, staging, performing, directing and producing were done by women. When a story demanded a male character, a female member obliged to act the male role. The group's commitment to presenting theatre from the eyes, ears and hearts of women continued through 1985. Les Nickelettes' work reflected a new style of musical comedy incorporating broad, irreverent comedy and satiric social commentary intermeshed with contemporary music and dance. The members changed throughout the history of the group but always maintained the artistic vision of a women's theatre collective.

== Performance history ==
- 1972 – Peoples' Nickelodeon Vaudevillian Cheerleaders.
- 1973–1974 – Virgins in Residence presenting bimonthly improv musical skits at Intersection Theatre.
- 1975 – It's Cool in San Francisco: The Ms. Hysterical Contest & It's Vicious Out There. Cabaret theatre.
- 1976 – Peter Pan: A New Rock Fairytale. Musical comedy play.
- 1977 – Nothing's Sacred Cabaret.
- 1978 – Curtains! A musical-mystery comedy play.
- 1979 – Peter Pan: A New Wave Fairytale (revised). Musical comedy play.
- 1980 – Spaced Out. An intergalactic musical comedy play.
- 1981 – I'd Rather Be Doing Something Else; The Didi Glitz Story. A comic book musical comedy play. In collaboration with Diane Noomin.
- 1982 – Anarchy In High Heels. New York. Cabaret theatre.
- 1983 – Anarchy In High Heels San Francisco. Cabaret theatre.
- 1985 – Oh Goddess! A spiritual musical comedy play.
