= Sharon McNight =

American actress and singer

- Born: United States
- Occupations: Singer, actress, director
- Years active: 1976–present
- Website: sharonmcnight.com

Sharon McNight is an American singer, actress and director. She received Theatre World Award and a Tony Award nomination for Best Actress in a Musical for the 1989 fantasy musical, Starmites.

McNight began her career in San Francisco performing in Cabaret. In 1976, she wrote and directed a film adaptation of erotic novel The Autobiography of a Flea. As a singer, McNight recorded six studio albums. Her regional stage credits include Hello, Dolly! and Nunsense. In 1987 she performed in off-Broadway musical, Starmites. It opened on Broadway in 1989 to positive reception. McNight received Theatre World Award and Tony Award nomination for Best Actress in a Musical.

McNight appeared in films Behind the Green Door: the Sequel (1986), Corporate Affairs (1990), Me Myself and I (1992), My Neighbor's Daughter (1998) and Guinevere (1999). She also made guest-starring appearances on television series Seinfeld and Silk Stalkings. She played Sophie Tucker in the musical production Red Hot Mama in various productions during the 2000s and 2010s.
