= Immanuel Casto =

Italian singer-songwriter and activist (born 1983)

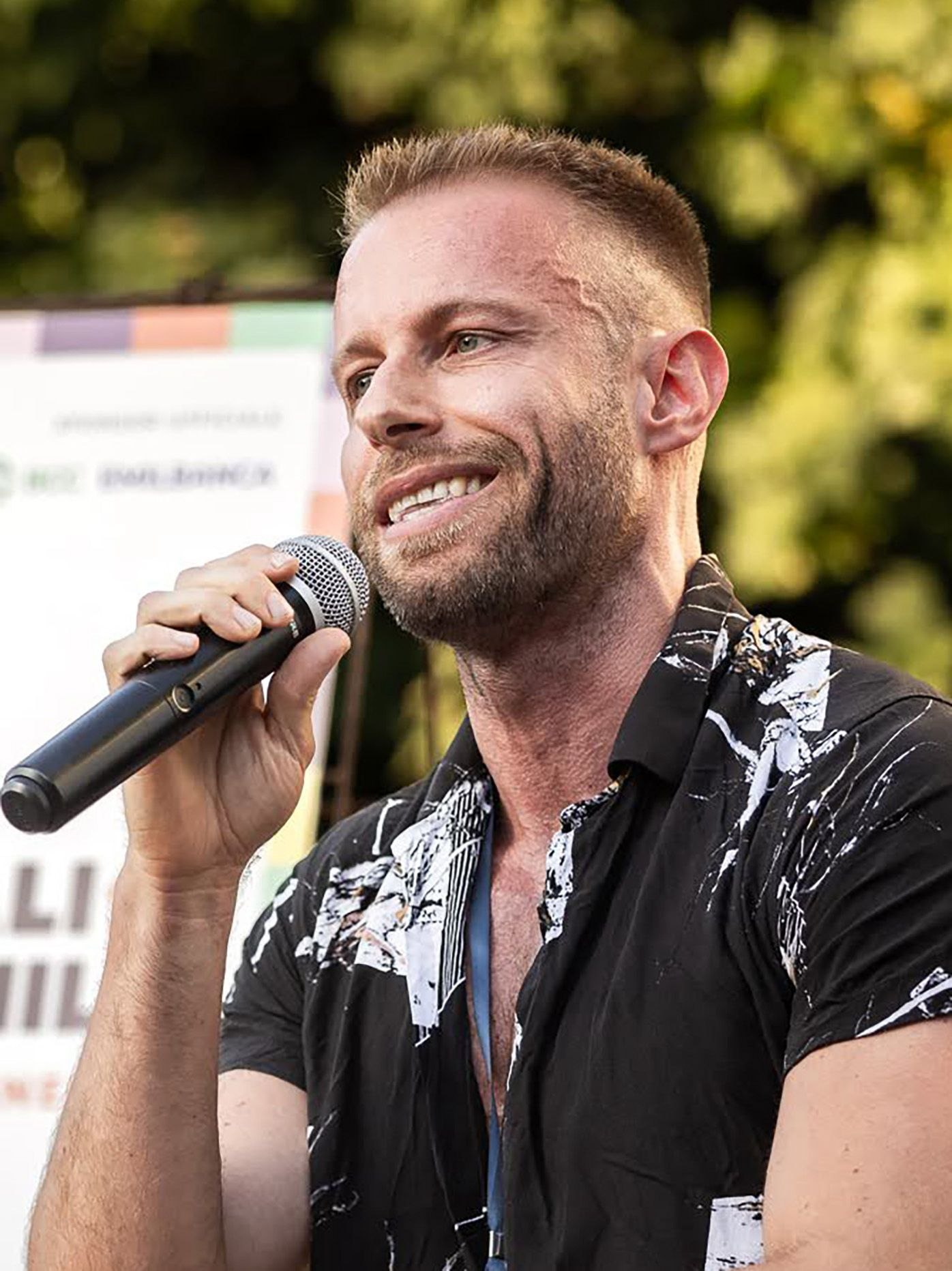

Background information
- Born: Manuel Cuni; 16 September 1983 (age 43); Alzano Lombardo, Italy
- Genre: Porn groove
- Occupation: Singer-songwriter
- Instruments: Vocals
- Years active: 2005–present
- Labels: JLe Management; Freak & Chic

Manuel Cuni (born 16 September 1983), known professionally as Immanuel Casto, is an Italian singer-songwriter and activist. Between 2019 and 2023, Cuni was also the president of the organization Mensa Italia.

== Biography ==
=== 1983–2008: Early works ===
Born in Alzano Lombardo, Cuni moved to Bologna in 2002 to work as an art director. Between 2003 and 2004, with the stage name Immanuel, Cuni produced and released the EPs On the Road, Voyeur and Vento di erezioni. The songs showed an ironic take on sex and pornography, in a dance/electronic style. According to Casto, his work belongs in the porn groove music genre. In 2005, the song "Io la do" got to be broadcast nationally on Radio Deejay.

The 2008 music video for "Anal Beat" was Casto's big break. He became a regular guest on MTV Italia's Loveline, and got to be featured on El País. In the same year, Casto signed with Jle Management. In June, Casto performed at the National Gay Pride and published his first greatest hits The Hits.

=== 2009–2014: Adult Music and Freak & Chic ===
In 2009, Casto went on his first national tour and released the single "Touché (Par l'amour)", his first song available on digital stores and produced by his future main collaborator, Keen. In 2010, he began his collaboration with singer-songwriter Romina Falconi, releasing "Crash", one of Casto's most successful singles, later included in his first studio album, Adult Music (Universal 2011).

On 13 September 2013, Casto published his second studio album Freak & Chic, which included the singles "Tropicanal" and "Sexual Navigator" (featuring the drag queen Minerva Lowenthal). Romina Falconi is featured on the third single, "Sognando Cracovia", which became the title for Casto and Falconi's joint tour in 2014–2015. In turn, Casto appeared on the song "Eyeliner", included in Falconi's album Certi sogni si fanno attraverso un filo d'odio.

=== 2015–2018: The Pink Album and L'età del consenso ===
In 2015, Casto released "Deepthroat Revolution" and announced his third studio work, The Pink Album, published on September 25. With "Rosico" Casto begins his collaboration with Tying Tiffany, while "Rosso oro e nero" is a cover of Einstürzende Neubauten's "Sabrina", performed with Italian post punk band Soviet Soviet, and "Horror Vacui" features once again Romina Falconi. The video for "Alphabet of Love", featuring adult performer Franco Trentalance, has been officially released in September 2016 on Pornhub. According to a statement released by Casto's production company, it is the first time a European artist gets to release their video on the site.

On 14 September 2018, Casto released the greatest hits L'età del consenso. The lead single, "Piromane", featuring Romina Falconi, was released on 5 June 2018.

=== 2019–present: Malcostume and Formato non riconosciuto ===
On 1 November 2019, Casto became president of the organization Mensa Italia.

On 18 June, 2021, Casto released the single "Dick Pic", a ballad about the annoying habit, widespread in the gay community but not only, of sending unsolicited images of genitals, in chat or on social networks. On 3 December 2021, Casto released the single "Piena" in collaboration with the group Karma B.

In 2022, Casto edited the graphics of the book Rottocalco by Romina Falconi. On 10 June 2022, Casto released his fourth studio album, Malcostume, preceded by the single "Wasabi Shock".

On March 31, 2026, Casto announced a new concert tour scheduled for the autumn of the same year in support of his new album, Formato non riconosciuto, as well as a new theatrical comedy monologue titled Non ha senso ma mi adeguo, scheduled for 2027.

== Controversies ==
In 2012, Casto released Squillo (lit. "call girl"), a collectible card game about prostitution, sex trafficking, and various criminal activities. On 9 October 2012, senator Emanuela Baio Dossi urged for the game to be removed from stores due to its controversial and offensive content.

The song "Da grande sarai fr**io" (lit. "When you grow up you'll be a f*ggot") from The Pink Album sparked some controversy upon its release, in spite of carrying an "it gets better" message aimed at LGBT youth. Due to Casto's trademark explicit and politically incorrect style and his use of slurs, it was deemed offensive by part of his LGBT audience, prompting Casto, himself an out gay man and LGBT activist, to make a video addressing his fans and explaining the meaning of the song. In 2016, Casto released a satirical board game called Witch & Bitch; the politician Mario Adinolfi threatened to report Casto and the co-creator of Witch & Bitch Marco Albiero because he recognized himself in the illustration of the card "Omofobo" (lit. "homophobic").

== Discography ==
=== Albums ===
- 2011 – Adult Music
- 2013 – Freak & Chic
- 2015 – The Pink Album
- 2022 – Malcostume
- 2026 – Formato non riconosciuto

=== Compilations ===
- 2011 – Porn Groove 2004/2009
- 2018 – L'età del consenso

=== Singles ===
- 2009 – "Touché (Par l'amour)"
- 2010 – "Escort 25"
- 2010 – "Crash" (feat. Romina Falconi)
- 2011 – "Revival"
- 2011 – "Killer Star"
- 2012 – "Zero carboidrati"
- 2012 – "Porn to Be Alive"
- 2012 – "A pecorina nel presepe"
- 2013 – "Tropicanal"
- 2014 – "Sexual Navigator"
- 2014 – "Sognando Cracovia" (feat. Romina Falconi)
- 2015 – "Deepthroat Revolution"
- 2015 – "Da grande sarai fr**io"
- 2015 – "DiscoDildo"
- 2016 – "Alphabet of Love"
- 2018 – "Piromane" (feat. Romina Falconi)
- 2021 – "Dick Pic"
- 2021 – "Piena" (feat. Karma B)
- 2022 – "Wasabi Shock"
- 2026 – "Amore alieno"
- 2026 – "Scende in pista il commercialista" (feat. Giorgieness)
- 2026 – "Fidel Casto"

== Comics ==
- Squillo – The Comic n. 0, Freak & Chic, Ariccia, Magic Press, 2014 (drawn by di Matt Core) ISBN 887-75-9790-9, 97-88-87759-7908
- Squillo – The Comic Vol. 1, Freak & Chic, Ariccia, Magic Press, 2016 (drawn by Matt Core) ISBN 887-75-9876-X, 97-88-87759-8769
- Morte Bianca (foreword), Verona, Poliniani, 2021 (story by Mortebianca, drawn by Marco Albiero) ISBN 978-88-3211-865-0, 88-32-1189-20,
