= A Night to Dismember =

1983 American film

- Original VHS cover
- Directed by: Doris Wishman
- Written by: Judith J. Kushner
- Produced by: Lorenzo Marinelli; Doris Wishman
- Starring: Samantha Fox
- Cinematography: C. Davis Smith
- Edited by: Lawrence Anthony
- Music by: Danny Girlando
- Production company: Juri Productions
- Distributed by: MPI Media Group
- Release date: June 14, 1983 (U.S.)
- Running time: 70 minutes; 79 minutes (original version)
- Country: United States
- Language: English

A Night to Dismember is a 1983 American slasher horror film, produced and directed by Doris Wishman. The film stars pornographic actress Samantha Fox as a psychotic young woman, recently released from a psychiatric institution, who is driven to kill by an ancestral curse. It was the first and only foray into the horror genre for Wishman, who mainly directed and produced sexploitation films.

Inspired by the success of slasher films such as Halloween (1978), Wishman signed on to direct and produce the film, derived from a screenplay by Judith J. Kushner. Principal photography took place in New York in 1979, with the bulk of filming taking place at the homes of Wishman and her friends. The film had a troubled production history: Wishman alleged that multiple reels were destroyed in the photo processing lab, resulting in her having to re-film sequences to graft onto the existing footage, as well as adding in stock material in order to make the film into a releasable final product. The film was completed in 1983 after four years of post-production, and subsequently released on VHS by MPI Media Group in 1989. In 2001, it was released on DVD by Elite Entertainment.

In August 2018, a video master of the original "destroyed" cut of the film–previously thought lost–was discovered in the possession of the film's cinematographer, C. Davis Smith, and uploaded on YouTube. This cut of the film features actress Diana Cummings in the lead role, as well as an entirely different plot; Cummings had been replaced by Fox after the purported destruction of Wishman's film reels.

== Plot ==
The Kent family of Woodmire Lake is thought to be subject to an ancestral curse that causes each of them to be murdered or commit familicide. Bonnie Kent is among the first, found hacked to death with an axe by her sister Susan; after committing the murder, Susan slips in the bathroom and falls on the blade, killing herself. Later, Broderick Kent's wife Lola is found murdered in her bathtub; he initially denies involvement, but soon confesses to the murder before hanging himself. Broderick's niece, Vicki Kent, is later sent to an asylum for murdering two neighborhood boys in August 1981.

Six years later, Vicki is released from the asylum, apparently cured of her homicidal tendencies. Her release is against the behest of her brother, Billy, and sister, Mary, both of whom want her recommitted. Upon returning home, Vicki's parents, Adam and Blanche, struggle to help her assimilate. Vicki attempts to rekindle a romance with her ex-boyfriend, Frankie, and is soon plagued by hallucinations. One night, Frankie and his new girlfriend are murdered by an unseen assailant during a sexual tryst. The killer decapitates Frankie before burning his head in the fireplace.

With her home life turbulent, Vicki attempts to visit her uncle Sebastian and Aunt Ann; her great-aunt Bea is also staying at the home. They turn her away, however, deeming her and her siblings all insane and unsafe to be around. The next morning, when they attempt to leave their house, Sebastian is murdered with a hatchet before Ann is run over with a car. Bea is pursued inside the house and decapitated, and the killer wraps her head in a cloth before storing it in a cupboard. Later while ruminating at the lake, Vicki is chased by a zombie-like male figure who emerges from the water, only later to find it was Billy attempting to scare her.

Later, Vicki attempts to seduce Tim O'Malley, a detective investigating the murders of Sebastian, Ann, and Bea, by performing a striptease. She subsequently hallucinates a sexual encounter between the two. Billy again attempts to torment Vicki, stalking her in a Halloween mask in hopes of driving her back into madness. That night, Mary awakens from a nightmare in which her entire family takes turns stabbing her to death. While Adam and Blanche attempt to console Mary, the home's electricity suddenly shuts off. Adam goes to check the main braker, and is stabbed to death with an ice pick by an unseen assailant. Shortly after, Blanche is brutally murdered in her bed.

Billy finds his parents' bodies and flees the house, only to be clobbered to death with a rock by Mary, who, convinced her family has tried to kill her, murders him out of fear. Back in the house, she hears a voice beckoning her, and traces it to a hat box, in which she has a vision of Vicki's severed head. Realizing she is in fact responsible for the murders, Mary retreats to the basement where she continues to hear disembodied voices calling her name. She flees outside into the woods, where the voices continue to taunt her.

O'Malley arrives at the house and finds the numerous bodies, along with Vicki, who appears to be in a fugue state, and holding a bloody hatchet. He chases her through the house and the two engage in a physical fight. She strikes him several times with the hatchet, but he manages to overpower her and strangle her to death. In voiceover narration, O'Malley recounts his discovery of diaries from each of the family members, which reveal that Mary committed all the murders Vicki had been accused of, including the murder of the two boys that warranted her psychiatric confinement. Meanwhile, Mary departs Woodmire Lake in a taxi, and murders the cab driver with a hatchet.

== Cast ==
- Samantha Fox as Vicki Kent
- Diane Cummins as Mary Kent
- Saul Meth as Adam Kent
- Miriam Meth as Blanche Kent
- William Szarka as Billy Kent (as Bill Szarka)
  - Louis Birdi as Masked Billy (uncredited)
- Chris Smith as Sam Kent
- Dee Cummins as Vicki Todd
- Larry Hunter as Larry Todd (as Norman Main)
- Mary Lomay as Ann Todd
- Rita Rogers as Aunt Bea Todd
- Nina Stengel as Nina
- Frankie Sabat as Frankie
- Alexandria Cass as Nancy (as Alexandria)
- William Longo, Jr. as Detective Tim O'Malley
- Robert DeRosa as Marty
- Heather Sabat as Sandy
- John Szarka as John
- Levi Richards as Broderick Kent (uncredited)
- Cindy Boudreau as Lola Kent (uncredited)

== Production ==
=== Conception ===
The screenplay for A Night to Dismember was written by Judith J. Kushner, and the film conceived by Wishman in the wake of the success of slasher films such as Halloween. In order to secure financing, Wishman made a trailer for the film using stock footage and snippets shot specifically for advertising. A financer from Chicago agreed to fund the production based on Wishman's trailer, giving her what she described as "a hefty deposit to finish the film."

=== Casting and filming ===
Filming took place in New York in 1979, with many of the locations being the private residences of Wishman and her friends and family. Portions of exterior filming (such as the forest scenes, and the sequence in which the two boys are murdered in the graveyard) in Westchester County. Additional exterior footage was shot outside Wishman's apartment in Queens along the Brooklyn–Queens Expressway, while rooms in Wishman's apartment were used to film several interior scenes. The final scene in which Mary's character is picked up by a taxi was shot in a rural area on Long Island. According to Wishman, she paid the taxi driver $25 to shoot footage of the car's advertisement that read "Get it done! America."

Some of the cast members were friends or family of Wishman; Miriam Meth, who portrayed Vicki's mother, was Wishman's cousin, who later worked as a makeup artist on Days of Our Lives. Miriam's house was used as a filming location as well, with her own character's death sequence being filmed in her garage. According to Wishman, pornographic actress Samantha Fox was cast as Vicki after sending a headshot and "writing really nice things" in a letter addressed to Wishman. Louis Birdi, an editor who had worked with Wishman on previous film projects, appears as a stand-in for Billy during the sequences in which the character wears a Halloween mask.

The special effects were provided by Les Lorrain, visual effects by John A. Bezich; cinematographer Smith's son, Chris, also helped contribute special effects.

=== Post-production ===
According to Wishman, several reels of the film were destroyed while in the possession of Movielab, a photo processing studio Wishman had hired to process the film. By some accounts, the reels were destroyed in a fire, while Wishman claimed that a "disgruntled employee" destroyed them when the company went bankrupt. Wishman estimated that the incident left her with "less than half-a negative" of film. "I had about sixty percent of the original film, and the rest were outtakes," she recalled. "It was very difficult to concoct another story that made any sense." As a result, Wishman was forced to piece the film together with outtakes and footage from other projects. She spent eight months entirely rewriting the screenplay, followed by four years of editing the film into a releasable final product. Wishman cut the film together herself, having recently learned the basic elements of film editing.

== Release ==
=== Distribution ===
The film was advertised for sale in Variety in 1983. Though some contemporary scholars have alleged the film was not released, it was given a release in the United States directly to video on June 14, 1989 by MPI Media Group. The following year, the VHS was suspended from production along with several other MPI-owned titles, such as Faces of Death, Horror Hospital, and Twitch of the Death Nerve, due to rights issues.

Elite Entertainment released a special edition DVD of the film in 2001, which featured an audio commentary with Wishman and cinematographer C. Davis Smith. On December 17, 2019, Frolic Pictures released the film on DVD as a double feature with Effects (1980).

On January 1, 2011, the Blue Sunshine film center in Montreal screened a digitally-restored print of the film. On June 4, 2016, the film was screened at the Film Forum in New York City as part of the "Genre is Woman" film festival, and featured an introduction by Wishman biographer Michael Bowen.

=== Critical response ===
Buzz McClain of AllMovie called the film "insultingly bad, infuriatingly terrible, and, worse, it's somehow managed to achieve cult status over the years." Author Brian Albright noted that the film is an "incomprehensible, yet compelling, post-modern mish-mash of gore and nudity." Michael Weldon in The Psychotronic Video Guide (1996) noted the film as "a disastrous meeting of Wishman and H.G. Lewis" accentuated by "gore, lots of it." Paper magazine, in a 1998 review, referred to the film as "a baffling utterly fascinating mess." In a review published by Tim Lucas of Video Watchdog, it was noted: "A Night to Dismember is to narrative film what falling down the stairs is to walking erect." Lucas specifically lambasted the film's narrative structure, and its tendency for events to be described via audio narration rather than shown. James Craddock in the Video Sourcebook gave the film its lowest rating (a "bomb"), noting: "Wishman has the reputation that equals Ed Wood Jr.'s as an auteur of alternative classics. This piece of junk cements her place in the cinematic hall of shame."

Todd Martin from HorrorNews.net panned the film, calling it "pointless", also stating that the film "doesn’t have anything going for it whatsoever". DVD Talk awarded the film two out of five stars, writing, "if there is such a thing as BAD bloodletting this is certainly it." Mick Martin of Video Movie Guide wrote: "A must for bad-movie buffs, this insanely disjointed slasher movie features almost no dialogue, actors whose clothes and hairstyles change in mid-scene, and a tacked-on narration desperately trying to make sense of it all." Noel Murray of The A.V. Club wrote of the film: "Between the artful nature scenes, the ugly interiors, and the kitchen-sink soundtrack, A Night To Dismember could almost be an avant-garde Guy Maddin homage to wincingly awful cinema. Instead, it's likely sheer coincidence that A Night To Dismember has become its own entity, a convoluted exercise in viewer endurance that perfectly evokes its title."

== Discovery of lost print ==
On August 9, 2018, Bloody Disgusting reported that the extended cut of the film, previously thought destroyed, had been posted on YouTube. The print was discovered when Ben Ruffett, the founder of the Hamilton Trash Cinema, inquired to cinematographer C. Davis Smith about acquiring a copy of the film to screen. Smith did not own the film's official VHS release, but did have a copy of the original extended cut on tape. This version features actress Diana Cummings in the lead role, and runs nine minutes longer than the previously released version. (Note: The "lost" cut of the film that surfaced in August 2018 on YouTube runs approximately 1 hour and 19 minutes.) In letter correspondence, Smith noted:

You have in your hands a rare copy of the “LOST” version of “A NIGHT TO DISMEMBER.”

I only know of three other existing copies of the film. One to a friend in Manhattan, one to another friend in Pennsylvania and the copy I have. Now you are among the elite to join the club. (There are no benefits!)(Unless it is possible nightmares!)

The story according to the Gospel of Doris is that a disgruntled employee of MovieLab, (the film processing company in which all the processing and printing work was accomplished) ruined much of the negative to the original version. “WHY” has never come to the forefront of our knowledge. (Or even IF !)...

Somehow the film was distributed in Europe in the original version. A lot of people are unaware of this... My information could possibly be conjecture. But I have seen paperwork from the distributor of the film showing that at least one print was sold as European Rights.

Smith also divulged in the letter that he had been hired as a replacement cinematographer, and that Wishman recast Fox in the lead role as she needed revenue to "salvage" the remaining footage after the reels had purportedly been destroyed. He also alleged that Fox paid Wishman $2,000 to appear in the film.

== Sources ==
- Albright, Brian (2012). Regional Horror Films, 1958-1990: A State-by-State Guide with Interviews. Jefferson, North Carolina: McFarland & Company. ISBN 978-0-786-47227-7.
- Craddock, James M., ed. (2008). Video Sourcebook: A Guide to Programs Currently Available on Video. Farmington Hills, Michigan: Thomson Gale. ISBN 978-1-414-40099-0.
- Kane, Joe (2000). The Phantom of the Movies' Videoscope: The Ultimate Guide to the Latest, Greatest, and Weirdest Genre Videos. New York: Three Rivers Press. ISBN 978-0-812-93149-5.
- Martin, Mick (1995). Video Movie Guide 1996. New York: Ballantine Books. ISBN 978-0-345-39783-6.
- McKendry, Rebecca (2010). "Fondling Your Eyeballs: Watching Doris Wishman". In Cline, John; Weiner, Robert G. (eds.). From the Arthouse to the Grindhouse: Highbrow and Lowbrow Transgression in Cinema's First Century. Lanham, Maryland: Scarecrow Press. pp. 57–74. ISBN 978-0-810-87655-2.
- Quarles, Mike (2010). Down and Dirty: Hollywood's Exploitation Filmmakers and Their Movies. Jefferson, North Carolina: McFarland & Company. ISBN 978-0-786-46257-5.
- Thrower, Stephen (2007). Nightmare USA: The Untold Story of the Exploitation Independents. Godalming, Surrey: FAB Press. ISBN 978-1-903-25469-1.
- Weldon, Michael J. (1996). The Psychotronic Video Guide To Film. New York: Macmillan. ISBN 978-0-312-13149-4.
- Wishman, Doris; Smith, C. Davis (2001). A Night to Dismember (DVD Audio commentary). Elite Entertainment. ASIN B00005OSJZ.
