= Corruption (1983 film) =

- Directed by: Roger Watkins (as Richard Mahler)
- Written by: Roger Watkins (as Richard Mahler)
- Produced by: Roger Watkins (as Richard Mahler)
- Starring: Jamie Gillis; Kelly Nichols; Tiffany Clark; Tanya Lawson; Tish Ambrose; Alexis X
- Cinematography: Larry Revene
- Edited by: Roger Watkins (as Richard Mahler)
- Music by: James Flamberg (as Andrew James)
- Release date: 1983
- Running time: 75 minutes
- Country: United States
- Language: English

Corruption is a 1983 American pornographic film written and directed by Roger Watkins under the pseudonym of Richard Mahler. The film, a loose adaptation of Richard Wagner's Das Rheingold, is about a group of shady businessmen seeking a mysterious briefcase which offers its owner untold power, on the condition that the owner renounce love.

== Cast ==
- Jamie Gillis as Williams
- Michael Gaunt as Franklin
- Tiffany Clark as Doreen
- Milton Ingley as Frederick (as Michael Morrison)
- George Payne as Alan
- Samantha Fox as Woman at Desk
- Tanya Lawson as Girl in Blue
- Marilyn Gee as Girl in Red (as Mary Constantine)
- Tish Ambrose as Girl in Black
- Kelly Nichols as Felicia
- Nicole Bernard as Dancer
- Bobby Astyr as Larry
- Alexis X as Lesbian #1
- Sabrina Vale as Lesbian #2
- Melissa Strong as S&M Girl
- Vanessa del Rio as Erda

== Release ==
The film was released in a Blu-ray + DVD combo pack by Vinegar Syndrome in 2016, along with the inclusion of Last House on Dead End Street, Watkins' non-pornographic debut feature, as a hidden feature.

== Reception ==
The reception to the film has been mostly positive. Cinema Blue called the film a "thinking man's porn", stating that "This is something different: this may challenge and provoke you, but it won't bore you, that's for sure". Writing for Blu-ray.com, Brian Orndorf called the film "artfully made and slightly unnerving", and compared the film positively to the works of David Lynch.
