= Music in pornography =

Music in pornographic films

Music in pornography is the non-diegetic soundtrack behind pornographic films.

Like in other visual media, music in pornography is considered high-quality when it is unnoticed by the viewer, but is nonetheless considered an integral part of the experience, enhancing the mood.

Music was absent but implied in early productions. Sampled music followed and defined the topic with early funk sensibilities before full, live orchestrations were commissioned during the Golden Age of Porn. When the number of porn videos exploded in the 1970s and 1980s, publishing rates exceeded the capacity for soundtracking, and background music was often cribbed or stolen from other sources. With easy digital distribution in the 1990s and onward, amateur pornography returned the industry to a non-musical standard of production.

== History ==
=== The silent era ===
Even in the silent era, erotic films such as Le Coucher de la Mariée and Fatima Djamile's Coochie Coochie Dance could be argued to have implied music with the stripteases and dancing of the performers — both activities that would have been accompanied by music in real life. Once sound films were being made, the Motion Picture Production Code (MPPC) in the United States kept professional equipment away from pornographers; this left such films short and silent until the 1960s, relegating them to amateur circles.

=== 1960s ===
With the sexual revolution in 1960s United States, the death of the MPPC, and the development of adult movie theaters, the audience demand for audio in pornography could be satisfied by producers with 35 mm movie film. Initially, these early soundtracks were hastily made by filmmakers and theater owners sampling other sources. The now-stereotypical "bow-chicka-bow-wow" (also called "porn groove" or "porno groove") is an early mashup of psychedelic rock, lounge music, early funk (particularly "Green Onions"), and sometimes pastoral folk. Prominently featuring wah-wah pedals, Hammond organs, and "piercing hi-hats", this music is evocative of 1960s and 1970s pornographic films, and has been released as soundtrack albums through at least the 2010s.

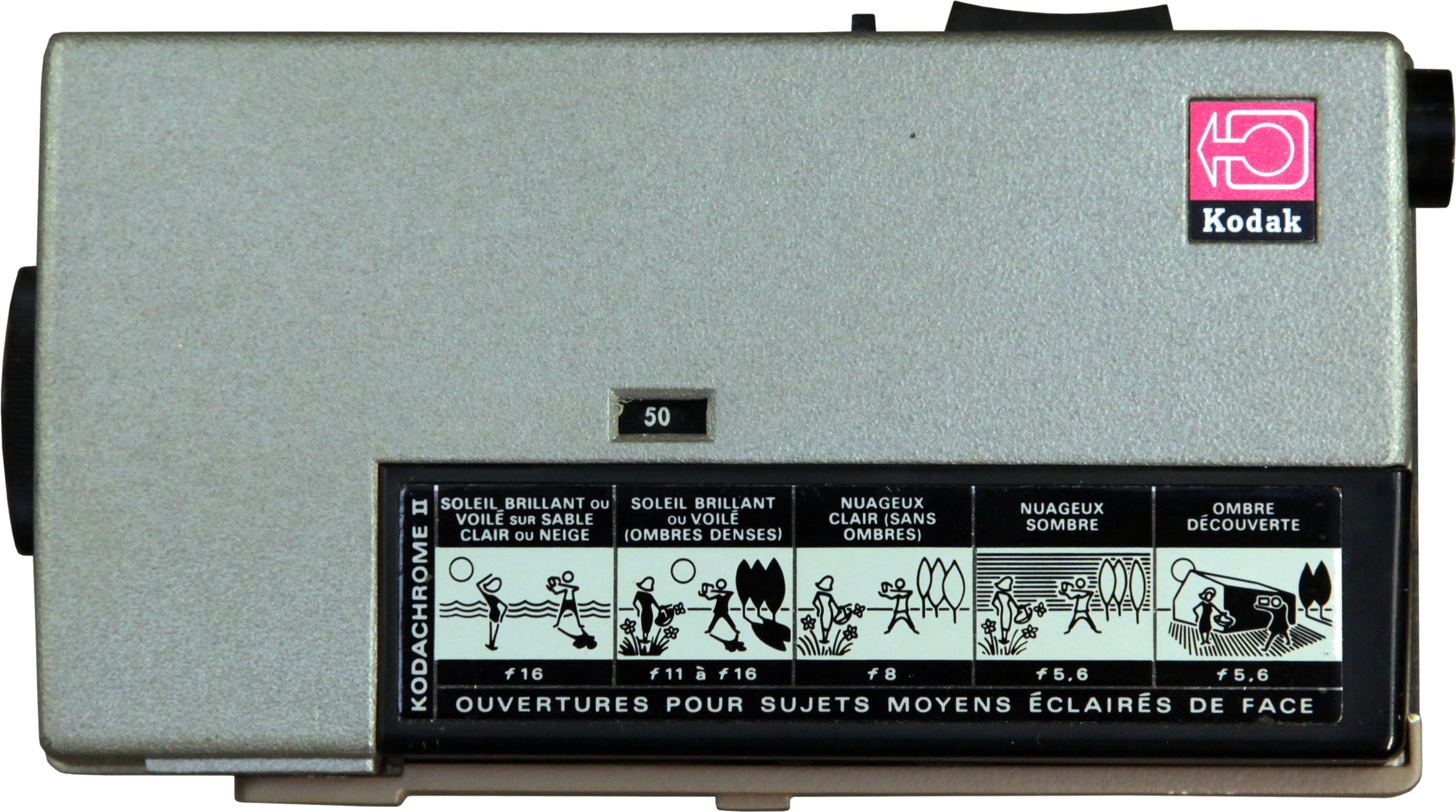
Kodak Instamatic M2-CnAM 43574

With the 1965 release of Super 8 film, amateur pornography with sound was a feasible, if risky, proposition. These filmmakers "experimented wildly with soundtracks", and while funk was still the primary genre, tracks with heavy percussion (especially those featuring bongo drums) were preferred here because they best survived the bathtub-developing processes of at-home producers.

At this same time, European art cinema made its way to the United States. These films were not strictly pornographic, but faced censorship in the US for their risque content, and so were shown in adult movie theaters. The 1968 Italian film Sweden: Heaven and Hell premiered Piero Umiliani's pop song "Mah Nà Mah Nà"; from West Germany in 1970, Schulmädchen-Report was backed with an acid rock soundtrack; 1971's Vampyros Lesbos was a West German–Spanish feature with sitars and psychedelic jazz; and the Italian–French Last Tango in Paris (1972) has "soaring horns and weepy strings from Gato Barbieri".

=== 1970s ===
Mona the Virgin Nymph was released in August 1970, and as the first "scripted sexually-explicit film to play in a movie theater", it is considered to be the transitional film between loops of 8 mm films playing at a stag party and films with production quality rivaling Hollywood publications.

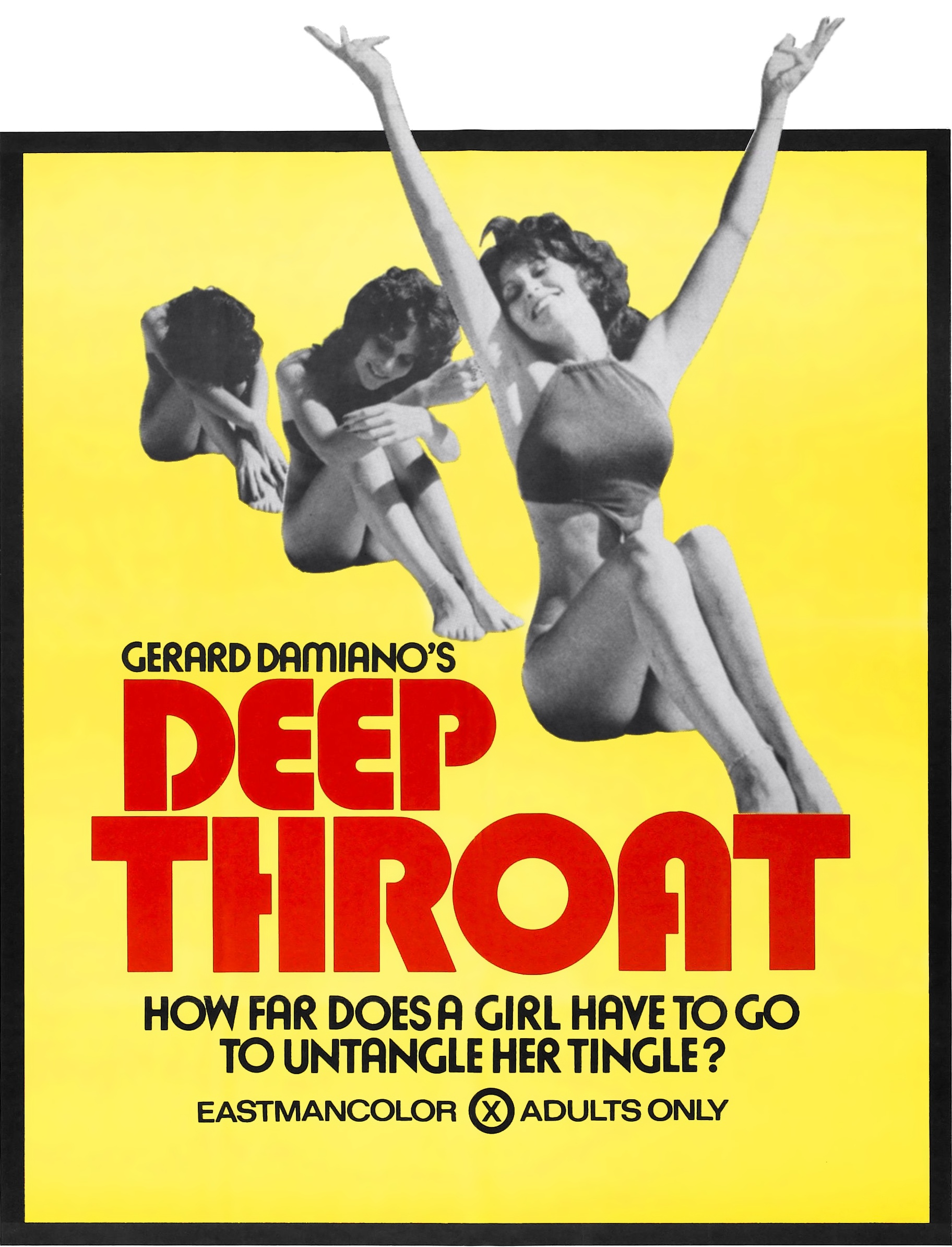
Deep Throat (1972)

Deep Throat and Behind the Green Door were released in 1972, featured hardcore sex, introduced the Golden Age of Porn, and were the first to feature soundtracks integral to the film. Deep Throat was attempting to find a wider audience for hardcore porn, and so designed its soundtrack around popular genres of music like bubblegum pop, show tunes, and light rock. The soundtrack was even released on vinyl record, and as of 2015, original copies sold for hundreds of dollars. Behind the Green Door is a mostly wordless film; principally carried by its soundtrack, the Mitchell brothers' film had a dedicated music department supporting the production.

The Opening of Misty Beethoven features an original score and was filmed across three different nations. Midnight Cowboy was the first X-rated recipient of the Academy Award for Best Picture, and its soundtrack featured John Lennon. Roger Watkins channeled The Rolling Stones and Kraftwerk for his film Her Name Was Lisa. Other notable Golden Age film soundtracks include Bernard Purdie's music for Lialeh, and Alden Shuman's for The Devil in Miss Jones. In 2012, the Phoenix New Times called out several porn soundtracks that continued to stand on their own merits, including, Deep Throat, Debbie Does Dallas (available at the Wikimedia Commons), The Devil in Miss Jones, Lialeh, and Emmanuelle.

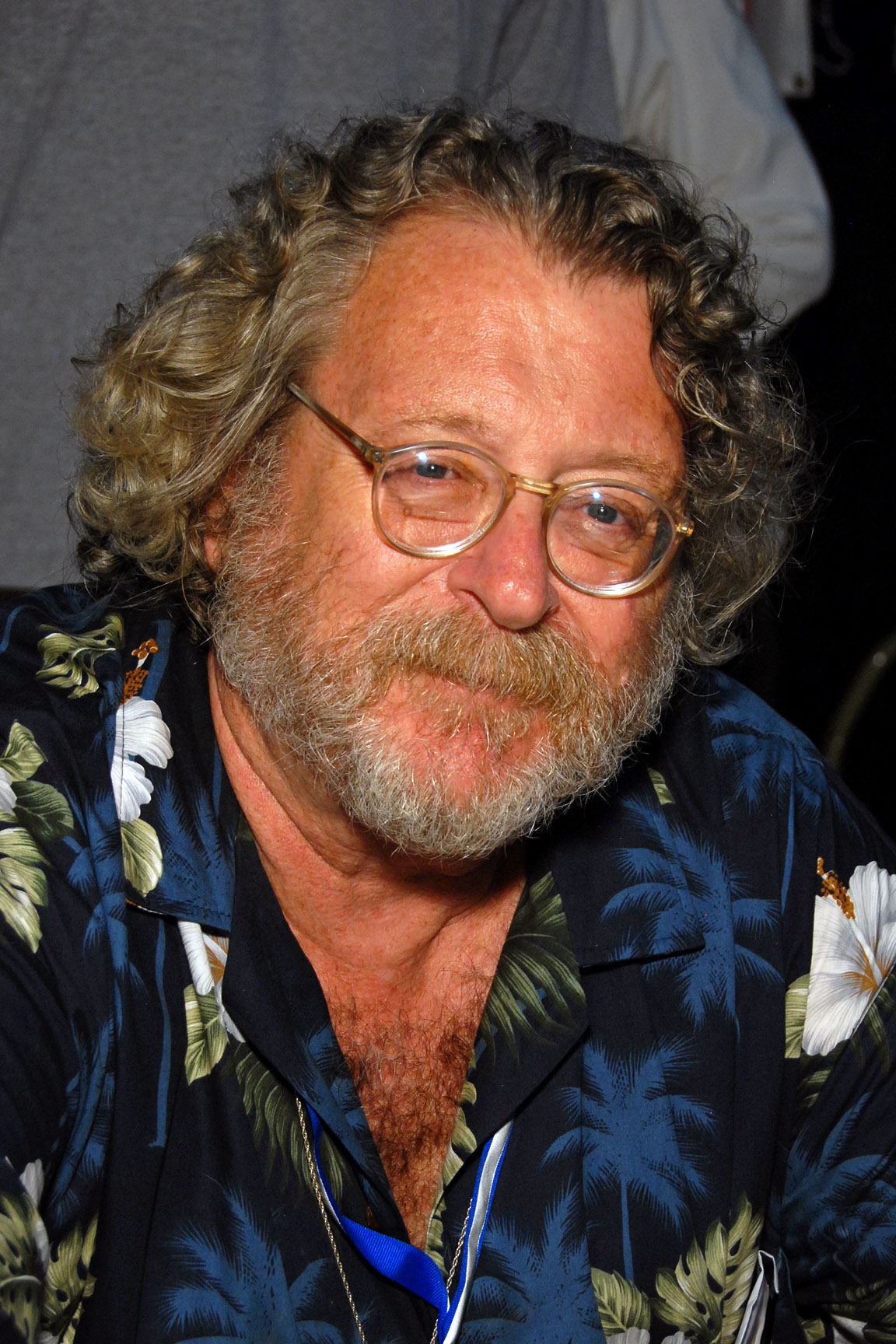
William Margold (August 2011)

With the success of pornographic and erotic films in the mainstream, there was a rush to market, but these films did not have similar music budgets. One concession was to use public-domain classical music for films; Marilyn and the Senator uses Modest Mussorgsky's "The Great Gate of Kiev" to bombastically punctuate a cum shot, and The Opening of Misty Beethoven climaxes to the William Tell Overture at one point. In contrast, William Margold went on record with the Red Bull Music Academy and explained that much of the porn music in the 1970s was stolen or plagiarized, even confessing his own:

Ennio Morricone was the big one – there was something about his soundtrack work that was just so visceral, but also could be very funky. If you ran most of the adult films from the '70s through a program, most of the music would come up Morricone. We thought he would get that we were giving him a whole new audience. Either that or he would too embarrassed to go after us. [sic]

=== 1980s ===
When studios like Vivid Entertainment and Falcon Entertainment began publishing many more videotapes than ever before, they could not provide custom soundtracks in a timely fashion for them all, nor could they crib music from other media due to increased scrutiny. The industry instead began simply licensing music or leaning heavily on electronic music that could be made faster. Hi-NRG pioneer Patrick Cowley composed the electronic soundtracks for Fox Studios' School Daze and Muscle Up, and New Wave Hookers' new wave soundtrack was instrumental to the plot (and featured The Plugz's "Electrify Me").

== Contemporary practices ==
The advent of digital cameras and the internet allowed for the easy and dramatic proliferation of amateur pornography. These videos tended to instead feature only ambient audio instead of a non-diegetic soundtrack: "barking dogs, washing machines, door bells, ringtones, chat notifications, outside traffic, radio talk shows, hip hop mixtapes, other porn from the TV or computer." Some professional productions have followed suit, only using actual music in the trailers for films; Eric Warner was the sound editor for Kink.com and said, "The trailer gets most of the production attention now in terms of sound and editing […] when I edit down the trailer, I basically grab what I can from the Internet, manipulate it enough so it's unrecognizable, and use it for the scene."

Feature porn films, while comprising far less of the market than previously, still have bespoke compositions backing their visuals, such as Evil Head and Not Another Porn Movie. AVN senior editor Peter Warren told Vice that "you need music for features. Music is an essential element of making these movies. You can’t have one without the other." When the AVN Awards added a "Best Original Song" category in 2009, some big-budget pornos still used popular pre-existing music for their scores (duly licensed).
