= Roger Watkins =

American film director

- Watkins in the early 1970s
- Born: September 17, 1948; Binghamton, New York, U.S.
- Died: March 6, 2007 (aged 58); Apalachin, New York, U.S.
- Other names: Claude Armand, Ray Hicks, Victor Janos, Richard Joseph, Norman F. Kaiser, Brian Laurence, Richard Mahler, Steven Morrison, Brian Newett, Bernard Travis, Bernie Travis
- Education: Oneonta State College
- Occupation: Film director
- Years active: 1973–1988
- Spouse: Marcia Elizabeth Elliott (m. 1972; div. 1987)
- Children: 2

Roger Michael Watkins (September 17, 1948 – March 6, 2007) was an American filmmaker best known for the 1970s grindhouse movie Last House on Dead End Street. He also directed several adult films, working with pornographic actors such as Jamie Gillis, Vanessa del Rio, and Samantha Fox.

The Internet Movie Database lists a number of Watkins' aliases (see the information box at right), most of which seem to have been used in Last House on Dead End Street to conceal the fact that he worked in several capacities on that film (director, actor, writer, editor, and producer).

== Biography ==
Watkins was born in Binghamton, New York. He graduated from Oneonta State College in 1971 with a bachelor's degree in English Literature. While studying for his degree he visited England and served as an apprentice for film director Freddie Francis. On returning to the U.S. he continued his apprenticeship, working for Otto Preminger and Nicholas Ray. He married Marcia Elliott in 1972, with whom he fathered two daughters.

Watkins began his career in adult film by writing the screenplay for Mystique (1979) which was directed by Roberta Findlay and for which he was uncredited. The following year he began writing and directing adult feature films under the pseudonym Richard Mahler, which he took from combining the names of two of his favorite composers, Richard Wagner and Gustav Mahler. His best known adult films (Her Name Was Lisa (1979), Midnight Heat (1983), Corruption (1983), and American Babylon (1985) are considered by many to be more cult films or arthouse films than pornography due to their multi layered narratives that are downbeat in tone, containing elements of avant-garde, horror and satire.

Watkins died at his home in Apalachin, New York on March 6, 2007, aged 58.

== Partial filmography ==
Year	Film	Function					Notes
Year	Film	Director	Screenwriter	Producer	Actor	Role	Notes
1976	The Doctors (TV series)				Yes	Doctor Slocombe	Guest appearance
1977	Last House on Dead End Street	Yes	Yes	Yes	Yes	Terry Hawkins	Filmed in 1973 under the working titles At the Hour of Our Death and The Cuckoo Clocks of Hell. Also released as The Fun House. Released originally in 1973 at Cannes Film Festival.
1979	Her Name Was Lisa	Yes	Yes				
1979	The Pink Ladies	Yes	Yes				
1979	Mystique		Yes				Uncredited
1980	Shadows of the Mind	Yes	Yes				Uncredited as screenwriter
1981	Spittoon	Yes	Yes				
1981	A Day in the Life of... The Cosmopolitan Girls	Yes	Yes				Uncredited
1983	Corruption	Yes	Yes	Yes			
1983	Midnight Heat	Yes	Yes				
1984	Driller: A Sexual Thriller						Production manager
1986	Avenged			Yes			
1986	Scorpion			Yes			
1986	Spine				Yes	At Police Headquarters	
1987	American Babylon	Yes	Yes				
1988	Decadence	Yes	Yes				
