= Romina Falconi =

Italian electropop singer-songwriter

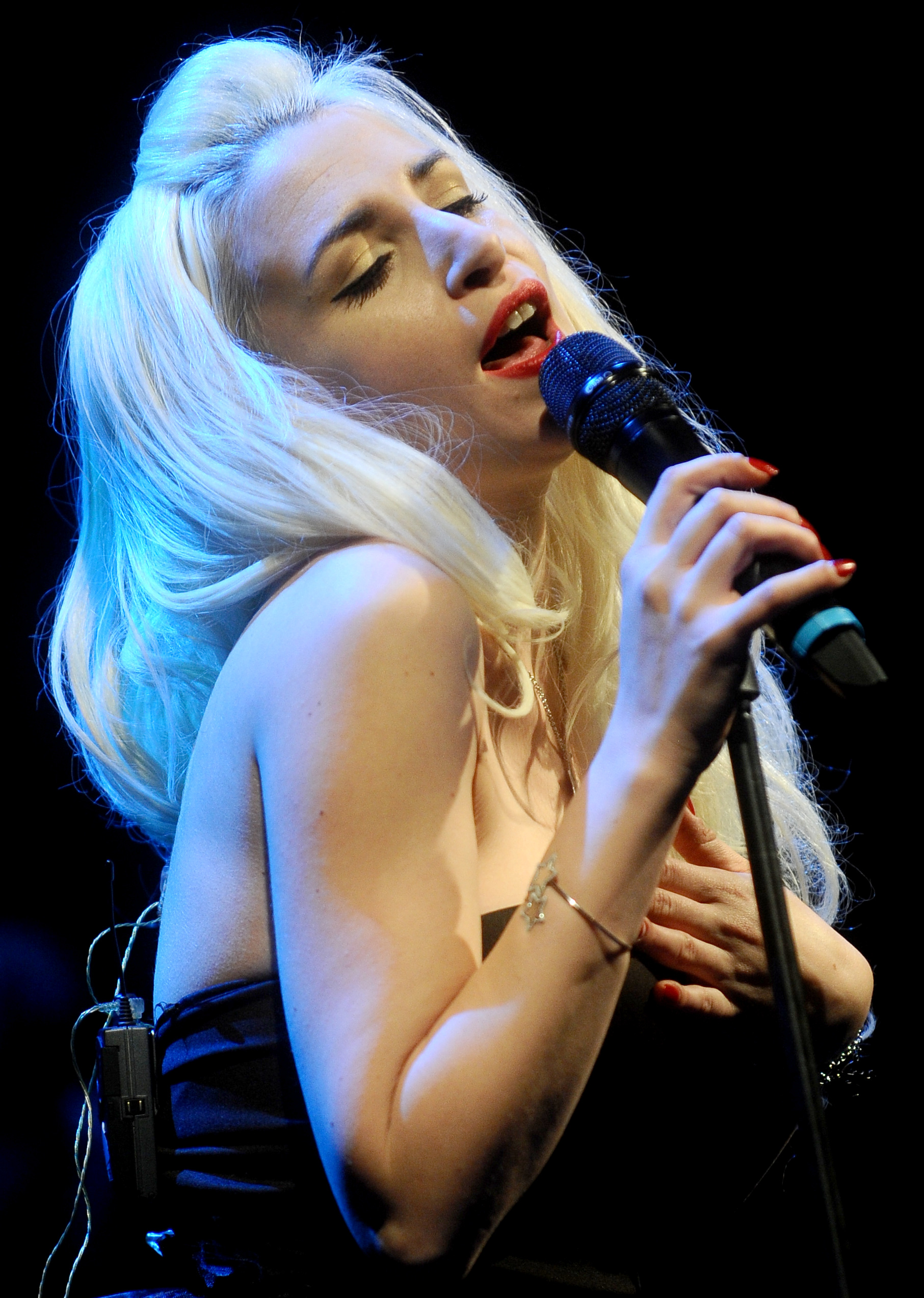
- Romina Falconi singing at Lucca Comics & Games 2015

Background information
- Born: 1 January 1985 (age 41); Rome, Italy
- Genres: Electropop
- Occupations: Singer; songwriter
- Instrument: Vocals
- Years active: 2007–present
- Label: JLe Management

Romina Falconi (born 1 January 1985) is an Italian electropop singer-songwriter.

== Biography ==
=== Early life and career ===
Romina Falconi grew up in Torpignattara (a known area of Rome), and made her debut on Teatro Ariston, at the 57th Sanremo Music Festival, in 2007, with "Ama", rising to the fifth position in the Newcomers section. In 2009, she worked as a choirgirl during Eros Ramazzotti's Ali e Radici World Tour.

In 2010, she moved to Milan, where she started her collaboration with independent humoristic songwriter Immanuel Casto, with "Crash", an electropop/comedy single contained in Casto's album "Adult Music".

=== The X-Factor experience ===
In search of a renaissance, after an unproductive period, in 2012 she decided to take part in the sixth season of the Italian version of The X-Factor, joining the Over 25 category and mentored by Morgan. Her fashion stylist was Roberta Martini. She started a dadaist trip in the new wave genre, which was far from her tastes, performing songs like "Duel" by Propaganda, "The Voice" by Ultravox and "Rio" by Duran Duran. One of her most notable performances was "Llorando", a famous theme from David Lynch's Mulholland Drive, and Roy Orbison's Crying cover. She was eliminated at the end of the fourth live show, after a variation on the trash genre, in which she revisited "Il tempo se ne va" by Adriano Celentano.

=== Independent works ===
After her experience in the showtime, in 2014 Falconi published her first independent Ep's, produced by JLe Management, named "Certi sogni si fanno", containing her most successful single, "Il mio prossimo amore". In the same year Falconi restart the collaboration with Immanuel Casto, airing new singles like "Sognando Cracovia" and "Eyeliner", ironic and grotesque ballads about greed, extreme sex and transgender people. While "Sognando Cracovia" is a taunting ballad joking about a double-dealer, polish carer and her customised old man, "Eyeliner" is the first Casto featuring in a song totally written by Romina, in which are included strong autobiographical contents, related to her youth and an important friendship with Giò, a transsexual woman. The videoclip is a sort of dreamlike and tragic suburb noir, inspired by T.S. Eliot.

Falconi's next EPs are named "Attraverso" and "Un filo d'odio". From these works were released singles "Attraverso" and "Maniaca", and videoclips for the same songs and "Eyeliner". Other videoclips were previously released also for "Sotto il cielo di Roma" and "Il mio prossimo amore", all directed by Luca Tartaglia.

During 2015 they made the Sognando Cracovia Tour. In the same year Falconi and Casto also tried to compete at Sanremo, introducing their song "Finché morte non ci separi", an outrageous collaboration with Conchita Wurst, but they went rejected by host Carlo Conti. The song was probably considered too eccentric and irritating to be included in a neomelodic competition.

On 16 October 2015 Falconi aired the video clip for "Playboy", one of the five unreleased tracks for her debut album, which recollect her three 2014 EPs: "Certi sogni si fanno attraverso un filo d'odio", announced for 6 November. On 30 October Falconi published the first single from the album, "Anima", the first Romina's radio promoted song.

In June 2016, Falconi and Casto aired their fifth collaboration, the Gay Village official theme, "Who is afraid of Gender?", for the first time with English lyrics. The song is an invitation to express themselves, while the official video is a choreographic carnival that includes guest appearances by Vladimir Luxuria and Eva Grimaldi, with scorns to Mario Adinolfi and Sentinelle In Piedi (literally Stand Up Sentinels), two of the most popular homophobic proponents in Italy.

=== Other works ===
In 2015, Falconi made a feature in Bikinirama's debut album's song Non ti sento, with Federico Zampaglione.

In 2016, she took part in the web show Citofonare Passoni, conducted by Diego Passoni. In the same year, she performed Maga Romina in Piero Chiambretti's Grand Hotel Chiambretti. In May, she hosted the second edition of Cromatica, a three-day-long queer festival, with performances offered by many italians lgbtq chorus, including actress Lella Costa as a guest.

== Discography ==
=== Albums ===
Title	Album details
Certi sogni si fanno attraverso un filo d'odio	Released: 6 November 2015; Label: Freak & Chic; Format: cd, download
Biondologia	Released: 15 March 2019; Label: Freak & Chic; Format: cd, download
Rottincuore	Released: 16 May 2025; Label: Freak & Chic; Format: vinyl, cd, download

=== Singles ===
- 2007 – Ama
- 2008 – Un attimo
- 2014 – Il mio prossimo amore
- 2014 – Attraverso
- 2014 – Maniaca
- 2015 – Anima
- 2016 – Who Is Afraid of Gender? (with Immanuel Casto)
- 2017 – Cadono saponette
- 2018 – Le 5 fasi del dolore
- 2019 – Vuoi l'amante
- 2019 – Magari muori
- 2019 – Buona vita arrivederci
- 2020 – Ringrazia che sono una signora
- 2021 – Magari vivi
- 2022 – La suora
- 2022 – Lupo mannaro
- 2023 – Maria Gasolina
- 2024 – La solitudine di una regina
- 2024 – Io ti includo

=== Other appearances in compilation albums ===
Year	Song(s)	Album
2012	Duel	X Factor Compilation 2012

=== Featuring ===
Year	Artist	Album / Ep	Contribution
2007	Nesli	Le verità nascoste	Vocals on track "Con me non ci parli mai"
2010	Eros Ramazzotti	21.00: Eros Live World Tour 2009/2010	Background vocalist
2011	Immanuel Casto	Adult Music	Vocals on "Crash"
2014	Immanuel Casto	Freak & Chic	Vocals on "Sognando Cracovia"
2015	Immanuel Casto	The Pink Album	Vocals on "Horror Vacui"
2015	The Long Tomorrow	The Fall Of	Vocals on "Like Rain"
2015	Bikinirama	Bikinirama	Vocals on "Non ti sento"
2016	Immanuel Casto	Who is afraid of Gender?	Vocals on "Who is afraid of Gender?"
