= Her Name Was Lisa =

- Directed by: Roger Watkins (as Richard Mahler); Robert Michaels (uncredited)
- Written by: Roger Watkins (as Richard Mahler)
- Produced by: Robert Michaels
- Starring: Vanessa del Rio; Samantha Fox
- Cinematography: Daniel B. Canton (uncredited)
- Distributed by: VCA Pictures
- Release date: 1979
- Running time: 88 minutes
- Country: United States
- Language: English

Her Name Was Lisa is a 1979 American pornographic film directed by Roger Watkins under the pseudonym Richard Mahler.

== Plot ==
At the funeral of a young woman named Lisa, several people who influenced her life in the time leading up to her death begin to have flashbacks. Paul meets Lisa in a brothel, and offers her money to pose for some nude photographs, which she accepts. After a few sessions, Paul introduces Lisa to Stephen Sweet, who provides Lisa with money, drugs, and an apartment in return for sexual favours. Initially, Stephen and Lisa participate in consensual BDSM sessions, but eventually this escalates into him hiring two men to rape Lisa in front of him. Behind Stephen's back, Lisa begins a sexual relationship with Carmen. Together, Lisa and Carmen get revenge on Stephen by sodomising him with a strap-on dildo. Finding that she's developed a tolerance to the drugs Stephen gave her, Lisa is introduced to heroin by Carmen. While under the influence, Lisa has sex with a couple, only to break down in tears in front of a mirror. Lisa comes to Carmen for more heroin, which she gives her in return for a kiss. Carmen offers to let Lisa administer her own dose, which results in her death by overdose.

== Cast ==
- Vanessa del Rio as Carmen
- Samantha Fox as Lisa
- Bobby Astyr as 'Doc' (uncredited)
- Robin Byrd as Final Girl with Lisa (uncredited)
- Barbara Daniels as Second Prostitute (uncredited)
- Ron Hudd as Final Guy with Lisa (uncredited)
- Rick Iverson as Paul (uncredited)
- David Pierce as Stephen Sweet (uncredited)
- Erica Richardson as First Prostitute (uncredited)
- Randy West as 'Dopey' (uncredited)

== Production ==
Watkins claimed that he refused to direct the sex scenes for the film, although he changed his stance later in his career after being disappointed with the sex scenes in Lisa. The character Stephen Sweet seems to be named after Steve Sweet, who starred in Watkins' 1977 film Last House on Dead End Street.

== Release ==
The film was released on Blu-ray by Vinegar Syndrome on May 29, 2018.

== Reception ==
Her Name Was Lisa has been generally well received. Writing for Blu-ray.com, Brian Orndorf was mixed on the film, saying the film "[wins] points for a decidedly morose tone... but here, [Watkins] just comes off as angry, bothered that sexual activity is interfering with his display of rage". In 1999, the film was inducted into the XRCO Hall of Fame.
