= Last House on Dead End Street =

1977 American exploitation horror film by Roger Watkins

- 1977 film poster
- Directed by: Roger Watkins
- Written by: Roger Watkins
- Produced by: Roger Watkins
- Starring: Roger Watkins; Ken Fisher; Bill Schlageter; Kathy Curtin; Pat Canestro
- Cinematography: Ken Fisher
- Edited by: Roger Watkins
- Distributed by: Cinematic Releasing Corporation
- Release date: May 4, 1977 (U.S.)
- Running time: 78 minutes
- Country: United States
- Language: English
- Budget: $3,000

Last House on Dead End Street, originally released as The Fun House, is a 1977 American exploitation horror film written, produced, and directed by Roger Watkins, under the pseudonym Victor Janos. The plot follows a disgruntled ex-convict (also played by Watkins) who takes revenge on society by kidnapping four acquaintances and filming their murders in an abandoned building.

Watkins, a student at the State University of New York at Oneonta, devised the concept for the film after reading the Charles Manson biography The Family (1971) by Ed Sanders. Commissioning a cast from the university's theater department, Watkins shot the film inside an unused building on the university campus in the winter of 1972, on a budget of around $3,000.

Watkins's original cut of the film, entitled The Cuckoo Clocks of Hell (now lost), ran approximately three hours in length. A truncated version of the film was released theatrically in 1977 under the title The Fun House. In 1979, Cinematic Releasing Corporation acquired distribution rights to the film and re-released it under the title Last House on Dead End Street, capitalizing on the popularity of Wes Craven's The Last House on the Left.

The film was met with a mixed critical reception, with reviewers criticizing its production quality and highlighting its grim tone and atmosphere. In the decades following its release, Last House on Dead End Street was subject to various rumors about who had created and starred in it, as the entire cast and crew were credited using pseudonyms. This resulted in speculation that the film might have depicted actual murders. In 2000, Watkins publicly came forward and confirmed himself as the director, writer, and lead actor. Two years later, the film was released for the first time on DVD, through participation from Watkins, and with the actual names of the actors revealed. The film has continued to be a point of discussion among film scholars, largely due to its metafilmic qualities, surrealist imagery, and themes surrounding the aestheticization of violence in cinema.

== Plot ==
Terry Hawkins has just been released from prison after spending a year incarcerated for drug charges. An amateur filmmaker, Terry claims to have previously made stag films that he was unable to sell. Convinced that modern audiences crave more extreme content, Terry decides to make a real snuff film. After choosing a large abandoned college as the setting of his film, Terry secures financing from an unsuspecting film company run by an openly gay film executive named Steve Randall. Terry rounds up a group of disparate women and men— some of them amateur filmmakers— who are willing to help make his film. Among them are filmmaker Bill Drexel; untrained actresses Kathy and her friend Patricia; and Ken, one of Terry's longtime acquaintances and a former pornographic actor.

For their first scene, Patricia and Kathy, wearing translucent plastic masks, lure a blind transient to the building. The women fondle him before Terry, donning a Greek tragedy-like mask, strangles the man to death while Bill films the murder. Meanwhile, pornographic director Jim Palmer, a peer of Steve's, waits anxiously for a party he is attending to end; his wife Nancy, done up in blackface, is whipped repeatedly in front of party guests as part of a sex game. Jim complains to Steve that people's tastes are becoming "hard to satisfy." The next day, Terry arrives at Jim and Nancy's home, and finds Nancy alone. He introduces himself as a mutual friend of Ken, with whom Nancy has previously appeared in adult films. Terry quickly seduces Nancy before showing her the footage of the blind man's murder in an attempt to convince her to ask Jim if he will invest in the picture. She is shocked by how realistic the footage looks; Terry confesses that it is in fact real, and rapes her.

The following morning, Terry calls Steve and asks him to stop by the building to visit the film set; he also inquires about a young actress named Suzie Knowles for a part in his movie. Steve arrives later that night, and is confronted by Terry and his crew inside the building, all of them wearing masks. Steve is knocked unconscious, and awakens to find himself tied up alongside Nancy and Suzie. Terry and his crew brand Suzie across her chest with a hot iron before Terry slashes her throat. Later, Terry goes to meet Jim at his office and kidnaps him. Back at the building, Terry and his crew beat Jim to death while Bill again films the crime. They then take an unconscious Nancy and tie her to a large dining table. She awakens to Bill filming her, while Terry uses a hacksaw to dismember her legs before they eviscerate her with gardening shears. During the mutilation, they periodically revive her consciousness with the aid of smelling salts before she bleeds to death.

Terry and his crew confront Steve with the corpse of the blind transient they killed earlier, and welcome him "back to the edge." Steve flees through the building, and is confronted in the basement by Terry, who tackles him to the ground. Bill emerges from a dark corridor with his camera while Kathy and Patricia taunt Steve. Patricia removes her mask and takes off her blouse, exposing her breasts. She unbuttons her pants, revealing a dismembered goat hoof she has held between her legs. As the group taunt Steve, Terry forces him to fellate the goat hoof. Steve escapes, but is cornered in an empty room, where a row of spotlights suddenly light up. Terry and his crew, armed with a power drill, approach Steve, plunging the drill bit through his eye socket, killing him. One by one, they slowly back away from Steve's body and disappear into the darkness.

As the scene fades out, a voiceover states that Terry, Bill, Ken, Patricia, and Kathy were apprehended and are in a state penitentiary.

== Cast ==
- Roger Watkins as Terrence "Terry" Hawkins (Note: Credited as Steven Morrison.)
- Ken Fisher as Ken Hardy (Note: Credited as Dennis Crawford.)
- Bill Schlageter as Bill Drexel (Note: Credited as Lawrence Bornman.)
- Kathy Curtin as Kathy Hughes (Note: Credited as Janet Sorley.)
- Pat Canestro as Patricia Kuhn (Note: Credited as Elaine Norcross.)
- Steve Sweet as Steve Randall (Note: Credited as Alex Kregar.)
- Edward E. Pixley as Jim Palmer (Note: Credited as Franklin Statz.)
- Nancy Vrooman as Nancy Palmer (Note: Credited as Barbara Amunsen.)
- Suzie Neumeyer as Suzie Knowles (Note: Credited as Geraldine Saunders.)
- Paul M. Jensen as Blind Man (Note: Credited as Paul Phillips.)
- Ken Rouse as The Whipper (Note: Credited as Ronald Cooper.)

== Analysis ==
Some film scholars have noted Last House on Dead End Street's unique preoccupation with and self-reflexivity regarding the aestheticization of violence. In Holy Terror: Understanding Religion and Violence in Popular Culture (2010), film scholars Gerry Carlin and Mark Jones point out the film's similarities to the Manson family murders, and note its religious undertones, which are amplified by the film's choral soundtrack: "Though principally a metafilmic commentary on cinematic perversity, the [lead character]'s gnomic pronouncements, and the excessively ritualized evisceral 'sacrifices' allude to a debased if fundamentally unrepresentable religiosity." Horror film critic and scholar Chas Balun echoes a similar sentiment, writing in 1989 that, "Last House on Dead End Street proves especially unsettling in the manner in which it blurs the lines between recording, inciting and participating in an act of violence. Other films... have similarly broached the subject, but none have been so alarmingly forthright and worrisome."

Film scholars Bill Landis and Michelle Clifford described the film as sticking to "a consistent, purposeful style that builds to the foulest mood imaginable, creating its own world of hate. In that unintentional exploitation way, it reproduces the Panic Theater extremes of surrealism, where evisceration is the metaphor for the sex act," likening it to the "bastard cousin of Otto Muehl." Landis and Clifford also note the self-reflexive framing of the film, deeming it "a film within a film motivated by a hate of pornography and the swingers who create it." Because of Terry's focus on murdering individuals connected to the pornographic film industry, Landis and Clifford herald the film as "the ultimate sexual revenge movie... What goes around comes around in the underground porno world, and Terry Hawkins makes this code his law, filming his targets as they take their last undignified breaths."

== Production ==
=== Concept and filming ===
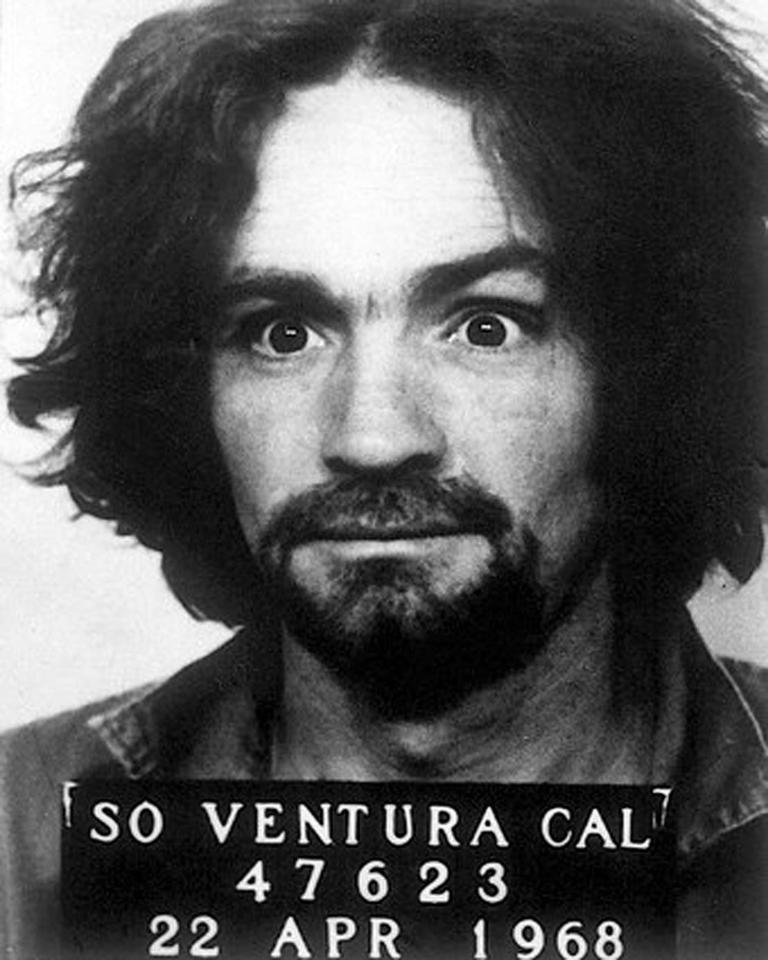
Watkins partly based the film on the Charles Manson murders

"Americans love violence the way they should perhaps love sex, but I'm not moralizing with this picture: it's not making a sociological statement. I'm interested only in the dark side of the personality. This picture is pure horror; it's not any more complicated than that."

— Watkins on his intentions making the film

Last House on Dead End Street was conceived by Roger Watkins, a student at the State University of New York at Oneonta (SUNY Oneonta), in 1972. Watkins was inspired to write the screenplay after reading the Charles Manson biography The Family (1971) by Ed Sanders, which focused on the Manson family murders in Southern California. The project was initially conceived as a straightforward biopic about the Manson family, but morphed into a feature about a disgruntled ex-convict who decides to make snuff films with a group of degenerates. Additional influence on the film's tone came from Watkins' disillusionment with the world at the time. Though Watkins was studying English literature, he became interested in filmmaking, and befriended several students in the university's film department. Through events sponsored by the film department, Watkins was able to meet directors Otto Preminger and Nicholas Ray, both of whom he idolized. Preminger took a liking to Watkins, and gifted him a Bolex camera, which Watkins used to film the simulated snuff footage featured in Last House on Dead End Street.

In casting the film, Watkins chose to star as Terry, the ringleader of the snuff filmmakers, and commissioned a cast exclusively consisting of current or former students of the theater department at SUNY Oneonta. The film was shot in December 1972 in an abandoned building on the university campus known as Old Main. The building, derelict at the time, was demolished in 1977. In spite of the film's content, the atmosphere on set was noticeably "relaxed", according to Watkins, with the only major conflict arising during the 'operation scene' with Nancy Vrooman extremely anxious while filming the scene. Watkins would later reveal that, at the time of the making the film, he was an amphetamine addict, and that only $800 of the $3,000 budget was actually spent on making the film; the remaining $2,200 was used to purchase drugs. The film's working title was And at the Hour of our Death.

=== Musical score ===
Due to budget constraints, the majority of the film's score and audio effects were sourced from composer and ethnomusicologist David Fanshawe, via KPM Musichouse audio library. In additional to Moog synthesizer pieces, the musical score incorporates Gregorian chants among other ambient noises. The film's original musical score was released for the first time on vinyl February 12, 2016 by the independent labels Vombis and Light in the Attic.

Track listing

No.	Title	Length
1.	"Pulse Of Terror"	2:23
2.	"Electrofear"	2:29
3.	"Occult"	2:58
4.	"Space Movement"	1:50
5.	"Psycho Theme"	1:22
6.	"Pulse of Fear"	2:23
7.	"Beat Me 'Till I'm Blue"	2:43
8.	"Agonythm"	2:21
9.	"Dawn Odyssey"	2:36
10.	"Destructive Powers"	2:24
11.	"Cybernetics Fast"	1:20
12.	"Terror Noises"	1:44
13.	"Dark Vibrations"	1:30
14.	"Nightmare"	0:44
15.	"Transformation Odyssey"	2:38
16.	"Celestial Cantabile"	2:23
17.	"Omination"	2:12
Total length:		36:00

== Release ==
The original 175-minute version of the film was titled The Cuckoo Clocks of Hell, inspired by a quote in the Kurt Vonnegut novel Mother Night (1962). This three-hour version of the film has been lost, with the original negatives either destroyed or missing. In April 1973, Watkins announced plans for the film to be screened at the Cannes and Berlin film festivals, but these screenings evidently did not take place. The film's release was delayed after one of the actresses sued Watkins, worried that a nude scene in the film would impede her chances of finding success as a Broadway actress.

In the spring of 1977, the film was released in a truncated cut as The Fun House, screening at drive-in theaters in Philadelphia beginning May 4, 1977, and throughout Connecticut beginning May 6, 1977, as well as in Shreveport, Louisiana, and Millville, New Jersey. It subsequently screened at a drive-in in Ithaca, New York beginning June 3, 1977, paired as a double feature with Mark of the Devil. It screened at drive-ins and theaters in Oakland, California in June 1977, and in Fresno, California beginning on September 30, 1977, with School of Fear and Meatcleaver Massacre as supporting films.

Independent film distributor Cinematic Releasing Corporation subsequently acquired rights to the film and had re-released it as early as March 1979 (Miami, Florida) under the title Last House on Dead End Street, a play on the title of the Wes Craven film The Last House on the Left (1972). It opened in New York City under this title on December 28, 1979. Vernacular historian Bill Landis note that, during the film's New York screenings—which occurred primarily in grindhouse theaters in Times Square—"people on the Deuce sat stunned and sickened, but unable to leave their seats." Watkins alleged that the film caused riots when subsequently shown in New York City and Chicago; it was apocryphally claimed that a theater in Chicago was burned down in a riot that occurred during a screening.

In the United Kingdom, the film was never submitted to the BBFC for cinema classification. It was scheduled for video release on the FLK label, but due to the growing hysteria regarding Video Nasties, only one batch was duplicated, and never officially released. Sleeves were printed, but destroyed; Tobe Hooper's similarly titled slasher film The Funhouse (1981) was briefly considered a video nasty; it is speculated that this was due to confusion with Watkins' film.

"For years, the film has been a psychotic mystery. No one knew who directed or performed in it, or what happened to them—nothing. A bloody mess of an exploitation movie developed a Phantom of the Opera enigma."

— Scholars Bill Landis and Michelle Clifford on the film's public reputation, 2002

For over two decades following the film's theatrical release, the true identities of the director and cast were largely unknown to the public, as the names given in the credits were pseudonyms. This sparked various rumors surrounding the film, the most well-known being that it had emerged from underground cinema circles in New York, and featured footage of actual murders. In his 1995 book Killing for Culture, David Kerekes stated: "Any attempt to trace the names behind Last House on Dead End Street will lead no further than the credits themselves, all obviously false." However, Chas Balun's 1989 review had in fact identified the film's director as "a young New York film student named Roger Watkins."

In December 2000, a contributor posting as "pnest" on the Internet messageboards of FAB Press (a publishing house devoted to cult movies), claimed to be the director, writer, producer, and editor of the film, "Victor Janos." The poster later revealed his identity as Roger Watkins. After the release of Last House on Dead End Street, Watkins had had a career as a pornographic film director, under the pseudonym Richard Mahler.

=== Home media ===
Last House on Dead End Street was scarcely released on VHS in the United States, and was made available on video through Venezuelan distributors in the late 1980s and early 1990s. A two-disc DVD set of the film was released in 2002 by Barrel Entertainment. The set features major contributions from director Watkins, who was heavily involved in its production. This edition was also released in Australia through Hard Corps Entertainment. A separate Region 2 DVD edition was released in the United Kingdom as part Tartan Films' Grindhouse series, in addition to a limited edition German release through CMV Laservision in 2003.

In a 2015 interview with Joe Rubin, the co-owner of the cult DVD and Blu-ray label Vinegar Syndrome, he stated that the company was preparing a restored Blu-ray release of the film:

It's probably the most tedious restoration we've ever done. We keep on finding more materials for it that are slightly better in certain places than the previous copies so we've had to redo/add to our restoration so many times. It's tedious. But it's coming. Unfortunately, no exciting revelations to be told; no fabled 3-hour cuts, etc. But when it does eventually come out, it'll look better than ever, even if it's still not perfect.

Though there has been no update about a standalone Vinegar Syndrome release, the uncut theatrical version of the film is available in 2K HD as a hidden feature on Vinegar Syndrome's release of Corruption on Blu-ray.

== Critical reception ==
AllMovie wrote, "This notorious exercise in low-budget gore is poorly edited and photographed, but its catalogue of horrors and a genuinely nasty tone make it worthwhile for fans of sick cinema," drawing comparisons to the Manson family killings. Eric Campos of Film Threat wrote, "It's not only the intense gore contained within these 78 minutes that has led many to label this film as the most vile ever made, but it's also the drab, dreary settings and the assortment of malcontents you're forced to put up with if you want to make it to the other end of this ride. Nothing that has to do with this film is happy or light and the film itself, even though presented nice and clear on this DVD, appears to be covered in dirt." Anton Bitel, writing for Film4, called the film "dirt cheap and deeply flawed, but still worth enduring, for even if the deaths are faked, there's a real enough intelligence behind it all."

In Slimetime: A Guide to Sleazy, Mindless Movies, Steve Puchalski wrote that the film is "harsh, repellent, and thoroughly unlikeable. It's effective much in the same way a large mallet to the temple is effective, but that doesn't mean it's any fun to sit through." Michael Weldon, in the Psychotronic Encyclopedia, similarly notes: "Have you ever heard anyone even admit they saw it? I wish I couldn't." Scholars Bill Landis and Michelle Clifford describe the sequence in which Nancy is dismembered alive as "one of the most revolting scenes in exploitation history... guaranteed to reduce even the most jaded viewers to quivering disgust." Critic Chas Balun wrote that the film "delivers a mule kick to the old nugget sack with a loathsome, virulent fury." Aside from the postscript describing the killers' incarceration after the murders, Balun states that the film "shows absolutely no moral equilibrium whatsoever." Writer Stephen Thrower similarly suggests that the film possesses "a forbidding, hostile vibe, a malignant radiation that sends your toxicity meter haywire... What gives it unique status is the aura of pure hatred that oozes out of every pore of the project."

TV Guide was highly critical of the film, writing "This vain attempt to combine splatter with a commentary on the viciousness of the movie business fails miserably on all counts." Alternately, Jay Alan of HorrorNews.net gave the film a favorable review. While admitting the film looked cheaply made, and featured poor audio and dubbing; Alan commended the film's gore effects, decent acting, disturbing atmosphere and tone, writing, "While it may not neighbor to the caliber of Last House on the Left, it is truly a house worth at least visiting at least once".

== See also ==
- List of American films of 1973
- Snuff films
- Exploitation films
- List of incomplete or partially lost films

== Sources ==
- Balun, Chas, ed. (1989). "I Spit in Your Face: Films That Bite". The Deep Red Horror Handbook. Albany, New York: FantaCo Enterprises. ISBN 978-0-938-78212-4.
- Carlin, Gerry; Jones, Mark (October 18, 2014). "Cease to Exist: Manson Family Movies and Mysticism". Holy Terror: Understanding Religion and Violence in Popular Culture. Routledge. ISBN 978-1-845-53360-1 – via Google Books.
- Cooper, Ian (2016). Frightmares: A History of British Horror Cinema. Studying British Cinema. Auteur. ISBN 978-0-9930-7173-7 – via Google Books.
- Cooper, Ian (2018). The Manson Family on Film and Television. Jefferson, North Carolina: McFarland & Company. ISBN 978-1-476-67043-0 – via Google Books.
- Heller-Nicholas, Alexandra (2011). Rape-Revenge Films: A Critical Study. Jefferson, North Carolina: McFarland & Company. ISBN 978-0-7864-4961-3 – via Google Books.
- Jackson, Neil (2016). "Wild Eyes, Dead Ladies: the Snuff Filmmaker in Realist Horror". Snuff: Real Death and Screen Media. New York: Bloomsbury Publishing. ISBN 978-1-6289-2112-0 – via Google Books.
- Kerekes, David (1995). Killing for Culture: Death Film from Mondo to Snuff. London, England: Creation Cinema Book Collection. ISBN 978-1-87159-220-7 – via Google Books.
- Kerekes, David (October 1, 2002). "Get Snuffed! or, How I Learned to Stop Worrying and Move In ... 'Last House on Dead End Street'". Headpress. ISBN 978-1-9004-8618-7 – via Google Books.
- Landis, Bill; Clifford, Michelle (2002). Sleazoid Express: A Mind-Twisting Tour Through the Grindhouse Cinema of Times Square. New York: Simon & Schuster. ISBN 978-0-7432-1583-1 – via Google Books.
- Puchalski, Steven (October 1, 2002). Slimetime: A Guide to Sleazy, Mindless Movies. Manchester, England: Critical Vision. ISBN 978-1-9004-8621-7 – via Google Books.
- Thrower, Stephen (2007). Nightmare, USA: The Untold Story of the Exploitation Independents. London, England: FAB Press. ISBN 978-1-9032-5446-2 – via Google Books.
