= Vanessa del Rio =

American pornographic film actress (born 1952)

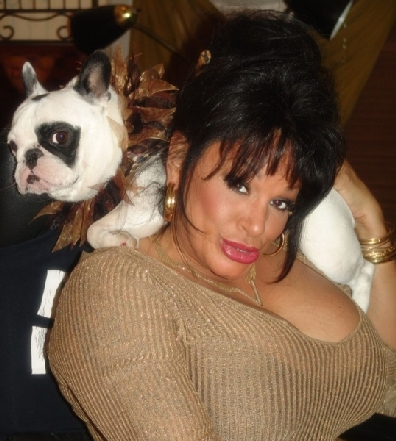
- Born: Ana María Sánchez; March 31, 1952 (age 74); Harlem, New York, U.S.
- Occupation: Pornographic film actress
- Website: vanessadelrio.com

Ana María Sánchez (born March 31, 1952), known professionally as Vanessa del Rio, is an American retired pornographic film actress.

== Early life ==
Del Rio was born March 31, 1952, and raised in the New York neighborhood of Harlem, the only child of a Puerto Rican mother and an Afro-Cuban father. Her mother would take her to see the Spanish language movies of Isabel Sarli, a passionate, voluptuous Argentinian actress with a charismatic power over men whom Vanessa credits as a big influence in her life. She describes her mother as "an innocent, deeply religious woman who didn't really relate to Sarli's sexuality."

Del Rio attended Catholic school before leaving home as a teenager. She studied coding, and became a computer programmer at age 18, then abandoned the straight life altogether to live in a series of stolen Volkswagen Beetles with a criminal boyfriend. When that adventure ended two years later she became "a waitress, then a topless barmaid, and finally a go-go dancer" before accepting her first hardcore porn role in the film China Doll because "it paid $150, which was exactly my half of the rent," so she could join a boyfriend in Europe.

In her illustrated biography from Taschen, she revealed to editor Dian Hanson that she also worked as a streetwalker and call girl prior to entering adult films.

== Career ==
For her stage name, she took the name "Vanessa" from a childhood friend and "del Rio" from actress Dolores del Río at the suggestion of another friend who was a movie buff.

Del Rio made her first adult film in 1974. In a span of 12 years, she appeared in 81 pornographic films and countless "loops" – 10-minute film clips produced for use in sex shop peep shows. She retired from adult films in 1986, in part due to the AIDS scare prevalent at the time. She then worked as a feature dancer and magazine model. After that she used her coding skills to create her own website, produce original content, continued to appear in magazines, and made special appearances at award shows and conventions.

=== TV and film appearances ===
During and after her porn career she appeared on many TV shows as herself, including a 1996 episode of NYPD Blue titled "Head Case" (Season 3, episode #15).

In 2008, she made a cameo opposite Bernie Mac as the amorous "full-figured neighbor" in the film Soul Men, which also co-starred Samuel L. Jackson.

== Popular culture ==
She has been mentioned in lyrics by several rap artists, including Chubb Rock's "Just the Two of Us", Gangsta Boo's "Fuck You", The Game's "House of Pain", Ice Cube's "Roll All Day" and "Giving Up The Nappy Dug Out" on Death Certificate, Digital Underground's "Freaks of the Industry" on their debut studio album Sex Packets, and Junior Mafia's 1995 single "I Need You Tonight" and "Get Money". She had a cameo in the "Get Money" music video.

Her name appears in a sample used in the track "Sex Sluts'N'Heaven" by Depth Charge and Blowfly.

In 2007, the German art book publisher Taschen released a deluxe, heavily illustrated biography, Vanessa del Rio: Fifty Years of Slightly Slutty Behavior edited by del Rio's long-time friend Dian Hanson.

A feature film, The Latin from Manhattan, based on del Rio's life, written and directed by Thomas Mignone, and starring Vivian Lamolli as del Rio began production in 2019.

The Czech EBM band Vanessa was originally named Vanessa Del Rio in an allusion to the adult film star. They have since mentioned her in several interviews, as well as songs.

== Filmography ==
- China Doll (1975) uncredited
- Too Young to Care (1975) uncredited
- Midnight Desires (1976), Lola
- The Night of Submission (1976), Venessa del Rio
- Dominatrix Without Mercy (1976), Venessa del Rio
- Virgin Snow (1976), Nurse Ratched
- Jacquette (1976), Madame X
- Domination Blue (1976), Trixie
- The Fury in Alice (1976), Marilyn
- Temptations (1976), Marla
- Reunion (1976), Elizabeth
- That Lady From Rio (1976), Number 1
- Come with Me My Love (1976), Lola
- Sin of Lust (1976), Carlotta
- Gulp (1976), Anna
- Forbidden Ways (1976), uncredited
- Come Softly (1976), June
- Bizzare Moods (1976), Norma
- Appointment With Agony (1976), Waitress
- Odyssey: The Ultimate Trip (1977), first girl in dream
- Joy of Humiliation (1977), Elena
- House of De Sade (1977), Lucille McLain
- Cherry Hustlers (1977), Sally
- Teenage Bikers (1977), Wolf
- Breaker Beauties (1977), photo lady
- Joint Venture (1977), uncredited
- The Fire in Francesca (1977), Nadine Rothman
- Tell, Teach and Show (1977), Mrs. LaGrange
- Exploring Young Girls (1977), Vanessa
- Let Me Die a Woman (1977), Sandy (uncredited)
- Chorus Call (1978), uncredited
- Take Off (1978), uncredited
- Woman in Love (1978), Simone Foster
- The Final Test (1978), Claudia
- Dirty Deeds (1978), uncredited
- Babylon Pink (1979), Housewife
- N.Y. Babes (1979), Jackie Robbins
- Jack & Jill (1979), Rosetta
- Tigresses and Other Man-eaters (1979), Tigress
- Her Name Was Lisa (1979), Carmen
- The Pink Ladies (1979), Seductress
- Fulfilling Young Cups (1979), Rita
- Angie, Police Woman (1979), girl on parachute
- Justine: A Matter of Innocence (1980), Claudia Kendall
- Co-Ed Fever (1980), Vannessa
- Afternoon Delights (1980), Mrs. Smith
- Dracula Exotica (1980), Vita Valdez
- The Filthy Rich (1980), Chili Caliente
- Girls U.S.A. (1980), Sherry Spencer
- A Scent of Heather (1980), the cook
- Platinum Paradise (1981), hooker
- Spittoon (1981), uncredited
- The Tale of Tiffany Lust (1981), Florence Nightingale
- Bizarre Styles (1981), Vanessa
- The Love-In Arrangement (1981), Chiquita
- The Dancers (1981), Frances
- Lips (1981), Maria
- Between the Sheets (1981), Shirley
- Beauty (1981), Judy Lopez
- Foxtrot (1982), Celeste
- Top Secret (1982), Juanita
- Real Estate (1982)
- Luscious (1982), Lush
- When She Was Bad (1983), Judy
- Silk Satin & Sex (1983), Denise
- Foxholes (1983), Vanessa del Rio
- Corruption (1983), Erda
- Aphrodisia's Diary (1983), therapist
- Sister Midnight (1984)
- Viva Vanessa (1984), herself
- Maid In Manhattan (1984), Juanita
- Blue Voodoo (1984), uncredited
- The Devil in Miss Jones 3: A New Beginning (1986), herself
- Play Me Again Vanessa (1986), herself
- Deep Inside Vanessa del Rio (1987), herself
- Beyond Desire (1986), Crystal
- Dynamic Vices (1987), Roxanne
- Doctor Lust (1987), Dr. Lana Lust
- Soul Men (2008), full-figured neighbor

== Selected television appearances ==
- NYPD Blue as herself, in the episode "Head Case" (1996)
- When Rated X Ruled the World as herself, in a VH1 documentary (2004)
- SexTV as herself, in the episode "UFO Sex: The Raelians/Jackinworld.com/Vanessa del Rio" (2005)
- Dave's Old Porn Season 2 Episode 4 Artie Lange, Vanessa Del Rio as herself (2012)

== Awards ==
- CAFA Award for Best Supporting Actress of 1980 – Dracula exotica
- CAFA Award for Best Supporting Actress of 1981 – Dancers
- Adult Video News – Hall of Fame
- X-Rated Critics Organization – Hall of Fame
- Free Speech Coalition Lifetime Achievement Award
- Urban X Hall of Fame
