= Chas Balun =

American writer and film critic

Charlie Richard Balun (June 12, 1948 – December 18, 2009) was an American writer and film critic for several horror magazines including Fangoria and Gorezone.

He died in California of cancer on December 18, 2009, aged 61.

== Books ==
- The Connoisseur's Guide to the Contemporary Horror Film (1983)
- Deep Red Horror Handbook Fantaco Enterprises (July 1989) ISBN 0-938782-12-6
- The Gore Score Fantaco Publications (June 1987) ISBN 0-938782-06-1
- Gore Score 2001: The Splatter Years Obsidian Books (November 2000) ISBN 1-891480-16-2
- Horror Holocaust Fantaco Enterprises, 1986 ISBN 0-938782-05-3
- Beyond Horror Holocaust: A Deeper Shade of Red Fantasma Books (December 15, 2003) ISBN 1-888214-08-2
- More Gore Score: Brave New Horrors Key West, FL : Fantasma Books, c1995. ISBN 0-9634982-9-0
- Lucio Fulci : beyond the gates. 2nd ed. Key West, FL: Fantasma Books, 1997; ISBN 1-888214-07-4
- Ninth and Hell Street (novel) Fantaco Enterprises (April 1990); ISBN 0-938782-13-4
