= Franco Trentalance =

Italian pornographic actor

Franco Trentalance (Bologna, 9 September 1967) is an Italian writer, television personality and actor. From 2005 to 2013, he was active in the pornographic scene where he was also a director.

== Biography ==
Born in Bologna on 9 September 1967. Before beginning his pornographic career, he worked as a barista and entertainer.

In 1996, he started acting in pornographic films, a career that ended in January 2017. In this phase, he appeared in over 950 hardcore scenes, for a total of 445 productions. He worked in Italy and abroad, with his favorite partners being Slovak actress Angel Dark and Hungarian actresses Nikki Blonde and Mia Diamond.

During this career, his main competitor was Rocco Siffredi, even though the two were never direct rivals. Trentalance believed that this rivalry was created by the press

As an author, he published Seduzione magnetica (Magnetic Seduction) in 2018, a book about seduction. In fiction, he co-wrote with Marco Limberti Il guardiano del parco (The Park Guardian), a horror book set in Mozzano.

In 2022, he started making wine, under the Falo brand, a reference to his porn career.

He participated in the 2008 and 2024 seasons of La Talpa, where he won in the 2008 edition.
