= Hat box =

Container for storing headgear

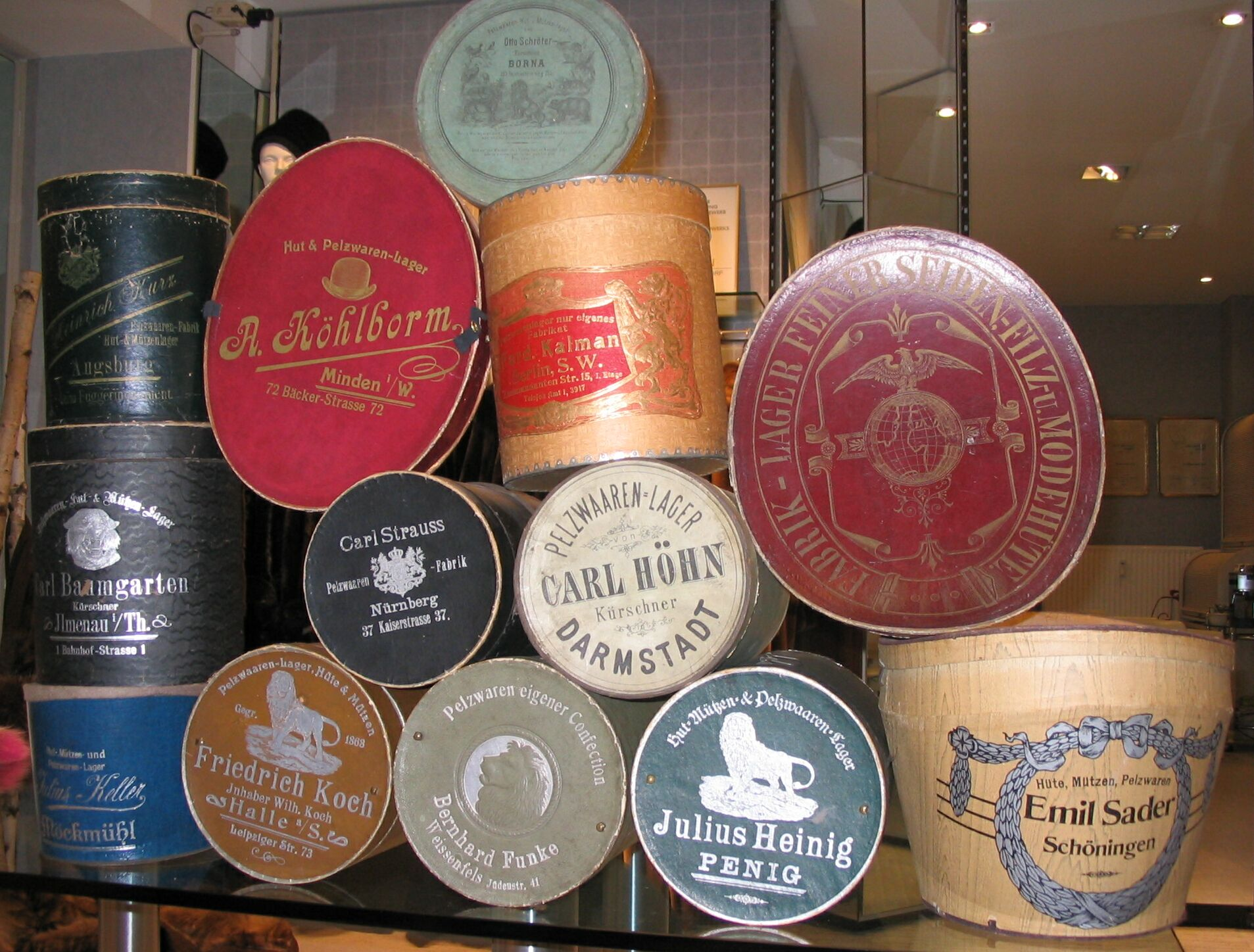
A collection of vintage branded hat boxes of varying sizes

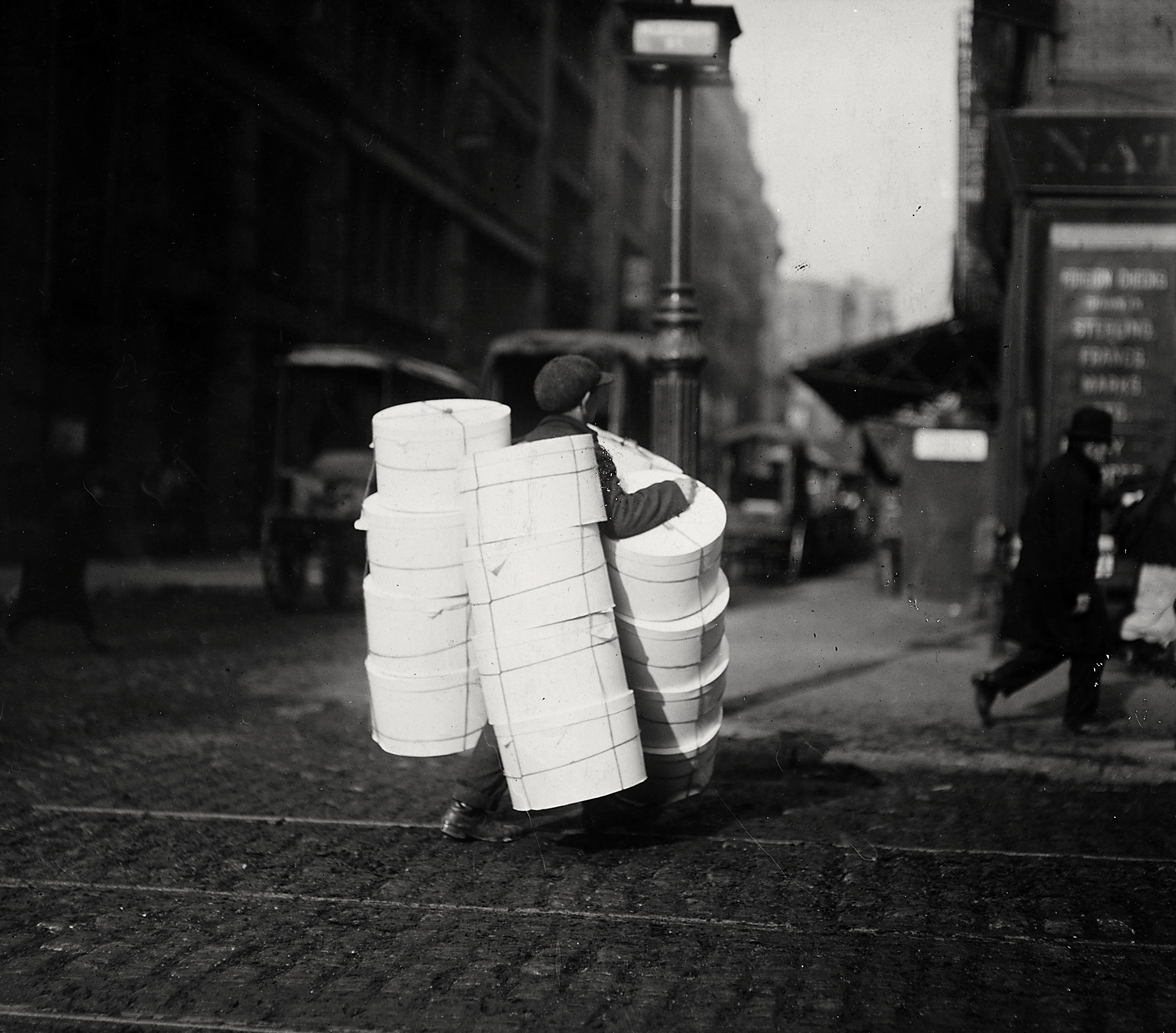
A boy carrying an assortment of hat boxes in New York City c. 1912

A hat box (also commonly hatbox and sometimes hat bucket, hat tin or bandbox) is a container for storing and transporting headgear, protecting it from damage and dust. A more generic term for a box used to carry garments, including headgear, is a bandbox. Typically, a hat box is deep and round in shape, although it may also be boxlike and used as an item of luggage for transporting a variety of hats.

Hat boxes may be made of a range of materials, including cardboard, leather or metal. They may include straps or a carrying handle for transportation. More luxurious models may be padded and lined in materials such as silk in order to protect the headgear.

== History ==
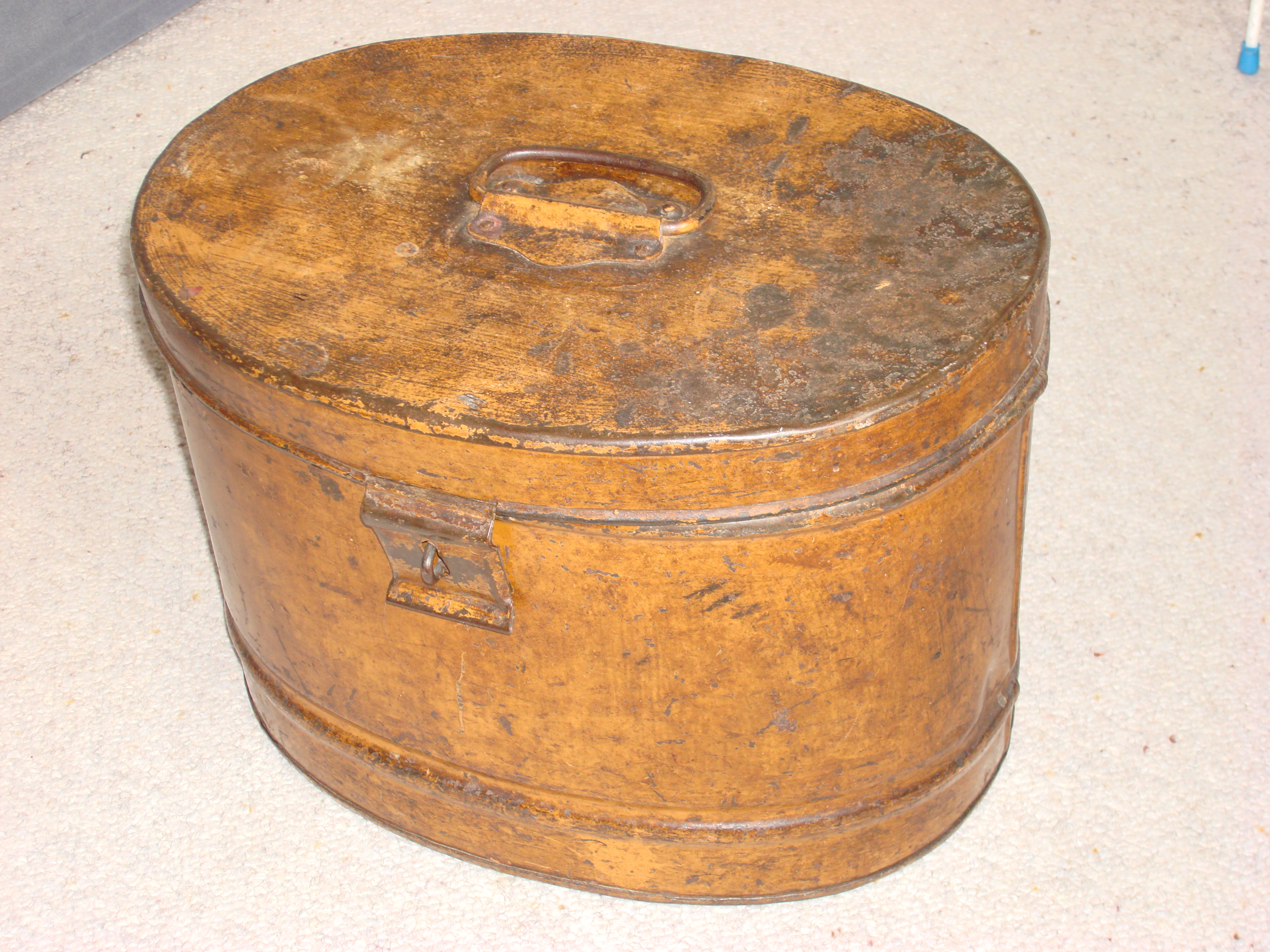
Hat boxes may be made of a variety of materials, including metal.

The concept derives from the earlier bandbox, which was used to store and protect ruffs (also called standing bands or neckbands) in the 17th century.

The hat box became a popular item in the 19th century – matching the popularity of hats for both day and evening wear – and accessories were produced to assist with both storage and cleaning. While milliners often packaged designs they sold in cardboard hat boxes, more robust designs were produced for travelling. Some designs were made to store more than one hat – including designs that could store both a daytime top hat and a collapsible version for evenings, known as a gibus. They might also include storage space for items such as a hat brush.

Designs became quite large during the Edwardian era. A letter to The Times in 1844 warned travellers that Blackwall Railway's porters had charged 1d to carry a hat box onto the train and a further 6d for transporting it to the London terminus, with the traveller himself paying only 4d for the journey. He recommended that travellers with luggage should go by steamboat.

== Design variations ==
While traditionally hat boxes are circular or square in shape, some versions may follow the shape of the hat. New York Historical Society archives include a crescent shaped cardboard design thought to be from the early to mid 19th century and attributed to the New York City hatmaker Elisha Bloomer; Canadian archives include a tin design curved to match the tricorne-style military hat worn by Isaac Brock and dating from 1812.
