= Samantha Fox (American actress) =

American pornographic actress

- Fox in 1980's Dracula Exotica
- Born: Stasia Micula; December 3, 1950; New York City, U.S.
- Died: April 22, 2020 (aged 69); New York City, U.S.
- Education: Sarah Lawrence College; Hunter College
- Occupation: Pornographic actress
- Years active: 1975–1984
- Era: Golden Age of Porn
- Notable work: Jack 'n Jill 1980; Roommates 1982; A Night to Dismember 1983
- Partner: Bobby Astyr (1978–2002; his death)

Stasia Micula (December 3, 1950 – April 22, 2020), known professionally as Samantha Fox, was an American pornographic film and B movie actress. She started working in 1978, working in film for almost a decade. During her film career, Fox starred in over 100 films, including Roommates, A Night to Dismember (1983) and The Devil in Miss Jones 2 (1982).

== Early life ==
Stasia Micula was born on December 3, 1950, in New York City. Her father worked as a foreign diplomat. She attended Sarah Lawrence College for art.

== Career ==
Fox acted in both porn and B movies, including comedy, drama and horror genres, eventually retiring in the 1980s to work as a fitness instructor. Despite ups and downs – including drug addiction – she had a lucrative career, especially as a muse for director Chuck Vincent.

=== 1970s ===
Fox started her career in porn industry in 1975. At the encouragement of her then husband, Fox modeled for adult magazines including Cheri and Hustler. She also worked briefly as a prostitute. The following year, Fox was discovered by a film production company when she accidentally knocked on the door of the company, thinking it was a magazine. She was recruited for porn on the spot.

Her first film was Here Comes the Bride in 1977, followed by Oddysex with director Gerard Damiano.

She starred in Chuck Vincent's 1978 film Bad Penny, and proceeded to work with Vincent throughout her career in both porn and mainstream films. In 1978, she met Bobby Astyr, while filming Double Your Pleasure. Fox described him as "something of a jerk." Fox and Astyr eventually started dating and remained a couple for 24 years until the death of Astyr from lung cancer in 2002. Fox co-starred in Tigresses And Other Man-Eaters in 1979. It was Ron Jeremy's first film, and Fox was the first woman he had sex with on film.

=== 1980s ===
By the 1980s, Fox was living in New York City, rooming with fellow actress Kelly Nichols. Fox was struggling with drug addiction, spending most of her income on drugs. In 1980, Fox co-starred with Jack Wrangler in the Vincent-directed porn Jack 'n Jill. It was their first film together. When Fox met Wrangler she "tingled all over" and they had "instant magnetism". They lived together for a week "playing husband and wife" to prepare for the domestic-themed swinging film. Also in 1980, Fox won the Adult Film Association of America (AFAA) Best Actress award for Jack 'n Jill. She was noted for her strong screen presence and her ability to play roles that range from an innocent to an assertive woman.

"When Samantha first worked for me four years ago, she was terrible. She couldn't act, her makeup and hair looked awful. But, she's worked hard and today she's a complete professional who could appear in any kind of film."

— Chuck Vincent, Superstars of Sex, September 1982

In March 1981, Fox said she was a "former drug addict" and had been clean for a year and a half. A few months later, she won her second AFAA Best Actress award for This Lady is a Tramp. In 1981, she also co-starred in Centerfold Fever with Tiffany Clark, Kandi Barbour, Ron Jeremy and others.

In 1982, she co-starred in The Devil in Miss Jones 2, the sequel to the seminal The Devil in Miss Jones. That same year, she co-starred in Roommates, playing the role of a call girl who seeks to leave sex work to work in television. Her role in Roommates was called "one of the top erotic performances ever", by Pornstar Classics.

Fox played the lead role in the 1983 Doris Wishman horror A Night to Dismember. One of her final adult films was in 1984, Jack & Jill 2 the sequel, again with Jack Wrangler. By this point, Fox was again struggling with drug addiction and she began detoxing from drug use; at the same time, she also suffered from pneumonia. She decided to retire from porn, sharing in a 2003 interview with Adult Video News that "I realized I had to close the door on porn and see if I could start from scratch." She eventually did, learning how to negotiate her own contracts, promoting herself, and booking her own appearances.

In 1985, Fox was indicted on federal charges in Utah for being part of a phone sex operation in which children in Utah were able to call a number and hear sexually explicit recordings that Fox had made. The charges were later dropped. Three years later, the federal Telephone Decency Act would be passed, outlawing phone sex nationally. That same year, she had roles in Streetwalkin' and Playgirl.

Fox continued acting in mainstream films, co-starring in Chuck Vincent's 1987 film Warrior Queen alongside Sybil Danning.

=== 1990s ===
After leaving the film industry, Fox attended Hunter College for physical therapy and worked as a fitness instructor. After some time, she was inducted into the AVN Hall of Fame.

=== Views on the film industry ===
When Fox started in the adult film industry, money did not matter to her – "I didn't take it seriously, it was pocket money." In a 1980 interview, Fox shared that she learned "a lot about my own sexuality by playing in adult movies. I am a lot freer now than I was before." Fox continued to believe adult films could teach adults to explore their sexuality into the late 1980s. She also acknowledged that the porn industry can be "manipulative" and "abusive, if I'd let people take advantage of me."

Out of the over 100 films in her canon, Fox's favorite was her first, Here Comes the Bride, from 1977. However, the 1979 film, Her Name Was Lisa, was the film she identifies most with. In an interview with Luke Ford, Fox said that when she was filming Her Name Was Lisa, she was a drug addict and "I had to play an addict that goes from bad to worse. It happens to a lot of hookers. I liked it because the acting was juicy."

By the mid-1980s, Fox expressed interest in seeing "prettier" adult films and more equality in the roles played by men and women, including less male dominance over female characters.

== Later life and death ==
Fox lived in the East Village in New York City. She died from a cardiovascular illness related to suspected COVID-19 complications at her home on April 22, 2020.
