= Kate Alexa discography =

- Studio albums: 2
- Soundtrack albums: 1
- Singles: 9
- B-sides: 3
- Music videos: 7

Kate Alexa is an Australian pop singer-songwriter. She has released one studio album, one soundtrack album, and five singles and is signed to Liberation Music. She has achieved five Australian top thirty singles, and one top one hundred album.

== Studio albums ==
| Year | Album details | Peak chart positions |
| Year | Album details | AUS |
|---|---|---|
| 2006 | Broken & Beautiful: Released: 25 September 2006; Label: Liberation Music; Format: CD, digital download | 64 |
| 2012 | Infatuation: Released 17 August 2012; Format: CD, digital download | - |

== Soundtracks ==
| Year | Album details |
|---|---|
| 2007 | H2O: Just Add Water: Released: 10 September 2007; Label: Liberation Music; Format: CD, digital download |

== Singles ==
| Year | Song | Peak chart positions | Album |
| Year | Song | AUS | Album |
|---|---|---|---|
| 2004 | "Always There" | 16 | Broken & Beautiful |
| 2005 | "My Day Will Come" | 24 | Broken & Beautiful |
| 2006 | "All I Hear" | 9 | Broken & Beautiful |
| 2006 | "Somebody Out There" | 21 | Broken & Beautiful |
| 2006 | "Better than You"^{1} | — | Broken & Beautiful |
| 2008 | "Teardrops" (featuring Baby Bash) | 26 | non-album single |
| 2011 | "Infatuation" | - | Infatuation |
| 2011 | "X-Rated" | - | Infatuation |
| 2012 | "I'm Falling" | - | Infatuation |
| 2012 | "I Deny" | - | Infatuation |

^{1} Only released in Australia as a radio single.

== B-sides ==
| Year | B-side | A-side |
|---|---|---|
| 2004 | "Turn It Up" | "Always There" |
| 2005 | "Walk On" | "My Day Will Come" |
| 2008 | "It's Alright" | "Teardrops" |

== Music videos ==
| Year | Title | Director |
|---|---|---|
| 2005 | "My Day Will Come" | Bart Borghesi |
| 2006 | "All I Hear" | Bart Borghesi |
| 2006 | "Somebody Out There" | Unknown |
| 2008 | "Teardrops" | Unknown |
| 2011 | "Infatuation" | Unknown |
| 2011 | "X-Rated" | Unknown |
| 2012 | "I'm Falling" | |

== Other appearances ==
The following have been officially released, but do not feature on an album by Alexa.

| Year | Song | Album |
|---|---|---|
| 2005 | "All I Want for Christmas Is You"(Mariah Carey cover) | The Spirit of Christmas 2005 |

== X Rated ==
X Rated has been used quite a few times this year on Home and Away (Last Spin: Ep.5723)
