= Somebody Out There =

Single by Kate Alexa

from the album Broken & Beautiful
- Released: 4 September 2006
- Genre: Pop rock
- Length: 3:09
- Label: Liberation
- Songwriters: Kate Alexa, Jim Marr, Wendy Page
- Producers: Jim Marr, Wendy Page

Kate Alexa singles chronology
"All I Hear" (2006)	"Somebody Out There" (2006)	"Better than You" (2006)

"Somebody Out There" is the fourth single from Australian singer Kate Alexa's debut album Broken & Beautiful. It was released in Australia on 4 September 2006 as a CD single and digital download. It became Alexa's fourth top thirty hit in Australia, and its music video was well received. Although not Alexa's most successful single, it is considered her signature song, and is included on H2O: Just Add Water.

== Recording and theme ==
Alexa started writing the song on an acoustic guitar, with Jim Marr and Wendy Page. Alexa states "Jim and Wendy are great". We got to know each other when we wrote "My Day Will Come", so it was nice to work together again.". Alexa states "When I wrote Somebody Out There, I had just started a new relationship. I was in LA writing, and my somebody out there was in Australia. One line sums it up for me "A thousand miles, a million smiles, how many more to go? I was thousands of miles away, meeting lots of people, but I couldn't wait to get home. Of course you can look at this song another way that there's somebody out there for everybody".

== Track listing ==
1. "Somebody Out There" – 3:09

== Chart performance ==
It entered the ARIA Singles Chart at #33 and rose to its peak of #21 in its fourth week of charting, and stayed on the ARIA top 50 for five weeks

Chart (2006)	Peak position
Australian ARIA Singles Chart	21

== Uses ==
The video of the song is featured on an episode of H_{2}O: Just Add Water called "Visions", where Emma's brother Elliot is trying to ask Cleo's sister Kim out on a date, and she asks him to move out the way so she can watch the video.

In Neighbours the song was featured, when Samantha Fitzgerald was playing it in her house also when Bridget Parker and Declan Napier when they went on their first date to the cinema.
