= H2O: Mermaid Adventures =

H_{2}O: Mermaid Adventures
- Genre: Animated
- Based on: H_{2}O: Just Add Water by Jonathan M. Shiff
- Written by: Eric-Paul Marais; Delphine Dubos; Franck Soullard
- Directed by: Tian Xiao Zhang
- Voices of: Sonja Ball; Thor Bishopric; Sara Braden; Danny Brochu; Sara Camacho; Bruce Dinsmore; Holly Gauthier-Frankel; Angela Galuppo; Pauline Little; Matthew McKay; Robert Naylor; Eleanor Noble
- Composers: Gérald Olivieri; Luka Nako
- Countries of origin: France; Germany; China; Canada; Australia
- Original language: English
- No. of series: 2
- No. of episodes: 26

Production
- Executive producers: Denis Olivieri; Nicole Keeb; Arne Lohmann
- Running time: 26 minutes
- Production companies: Les Cartooneurs Associés; Fantasia Animation (China); ZDF German Television Network; ZDF Enterprises; France Télévisions; CNC; Netflix

Original release
- Network: Netflix
- Release: 22 May – 15 July 2015

Related
- H_{2}O: Just Add Water (original series); Mako: Island of Secrets

H_{2}O: Mermaid Adventures is an animated Netflix television series that is based on the live-action teenage television series H_{2}O: Just Add Water created by Jonathan M. Shiff. It is produced by ZDF's production and sales arm ZDF Enterprises (who previously produced the original live-action series), animation production studios Les Cartooneurs Associés (part of Dargaud) and Fantasia Animation. The series is produced by Denis Olivieri and directed by Tian Xiao Zhang. A 13-episode first series was released to Netflix on 22 May 2015. The second series was released on Netflix on 15 July 2015.

== Characters ==
=== Main ===
- Rikki Chadwick, who is the rebel of the group, and close friend of Emma and Cleo. After becoming a mermaid, Rikki gains the ability to boil water. She is voiced by Holly Gauthier-Frankel.
- Emma Gilbert, who is the more reasonable, and responsible among her friends at times, and former synchronized swimmer. After becoming a mermaid, Emma gains the ability to freeze water. She is voiced by Eleanor Noble.
- Cleo Sertori, who is a shy girl that is very interested in studying marine biology. After becoming a mermaid, Cleo gains the ability to control water. She has romantic feelings for Lewis. She is voiced by Sonja Ball.
- Lewis McCartney, a tech-savvy young man who is close friends with the girls, and has a crush on Cleo, who has romantic feelings with him. He helps the girls out on their adventures, from distraction to technical support. He is voiced by Daniel Brochu.
- Bernie the Hermit Crab, a hermit crab who was saved by Cleo in the first episode. After the girls become mermaids, Bernie is able to talk with them, and regularly calls upon the girls to help him when there's trouble in the ocean. He is voiced by Bruce Dinsmore.

=== Recurring ===
- Zane Bennett, who is a troublemaker at times and has a shaky romance with Rikki.
- Miriam Kent, the spoiled daughter of Dolphin City's mayor, who causes trouble for the girls.
- The "Vandal Gang", a group of troublemakers: Murray the moray eel, Danny the octopus, and Burke, a hammerhead shark. They typically cause trouble for the denizens in the bay area.

== Episodes ==
=== Season 1 (2015) ===
1. "The Secret of Mako Island" – 22 May 2015
2. "Caught in the Net" – 22 May 2015
3. "The White Mermaid" – 22 May 2015
4. "A Stormy Party" – 22 May 2015
5. "Mako Island Hotel" – 22 May 2015
6. "The Mysterious Seaweed" – 22 May 2015
7. "It's in the Bag!" – 22 May 2015
8. "Dolphin City Triangle" – 22 May 2015
9. "Poseidon's Daughter" – 22 May 2015
10. "Dolphin City Mascot" – 22 May 2015
11. "Bad Waves" – 22 May 2015
12. "Jaws-ache!" – 22 May 2015
13. "The Lost Ring" – 22 May 2015

=== Season 2 (2015) ===
1. "Reported Missing" – 15 July 2015
2. "Memory Lapse" – 15 July 2015
3. "Valentine's Day" – 15 July 2015
4. "Kidnapped!" – 15 July 2015
5. "A Strange Phenomenon" – 15 July 2015
6. "Handle with Care" – 15 July 2015
7. "The Return of the White Mermaid" – 15 July 2015
8. "Three Days Underwater" – 15 July 2015
9. "Robot Duel" – 15 July 2015
10. "The Creature from the Bay" – 15 July 2015
11. "Underwater Takeover" – 15 July 2015
12. "Imminent Danger" – 15 July 2015
13. "Trapped" – 15 July 2015

== See also ==
- Mermaids in popular culture
