= Infatuation (album) =

Studio album by Kate Alexa
- Released: August 17, 2012
- Recorded: 2008–2012
- Genre: pop; rock; electro; ska
- Label: Liberation
- Producer: Tom Nichols, Future Cut, DNA Songs, Stuart Crichton

Kate Alexa chronology
H2O: Just Add Water (2007)	Infatuation (2012)

Singles from Infatuation
- 1. "Infatuation" Released: February 15, 2011; 2. "X Rated" Released: June 13, 2011; 3. "I'm Falling" Released: July 13, 2012; 4. "I Deny" Released: December 3, 2012

Infatuation is the second studio album by Australian singer-songwriter Kate Alexa, released on August 17, 2012 in Australia by Liberation Music. The album was released six years after Alexa's debut Broken & Beautiful (2006), and was preceded by four singles, "Infatuation", "X Rated", "I'm Falling" and "I Deny".

== Background and development ==
Kate Alexa released her debut album Broken & Beautiful in 2006, and the following year released the official soundtrack for the Australian television series H_{2}O: Just Add Water. In 2008, Alexa released a cover of Womack & Womack's "Teardrops" as a "gap between albums". She originally began recording the album in mid-2008, after the release of Teardrops, recording over eighty tracks and discarding five albums worth of material. Alexa was originally unsure of the album's direction: "The first [album] was really rushed so I wanted to have time to experiment, you know, make something that I was really happy with and something that I loved." Upon working with songwriter Tom Nichols, however, it all fell into place. "Tom was the last person I worked with... I met him and we had the same vision and wanted to go in the same direction, so I pretty much forgot about anything else, and just wrote this album. We wrote, then looked back over the other stuff, and it just happened that [the songs written with Nichols] just worked together." Although the album was predominantly composed by Alexa and Nichols, the track "I'm Falling" was composed by Alexa, Stuart Crichton and Kara DioGuardi. "It all came about when I was on the writing trip. I actually went in to work with Stuart for a few days. He's amazing – great to work with. So Stuart and I were together, but Kara was in the States. It was really random – we'd written this entire song together almost via correspondence. But it was really natural and I think it fits me very well. It’s very much where I was at that point in time."

== Composition ==
=== Influence and sound ===
Infatuation is predominantly a pop album, with influences of electro, rock, and ska, with Alexa describing it as an "eclectic mix", with influences including Cyndi Lauper, Gwen Stefani and Robyn.

The album is described as a departure from Alexa's previous works, with Alexa stating that "[the album] is edgier pop, whereas, the old album was more bubblegum, young teen pop... at the time of my first album (Broken & Beautiful) I loved that, and now, I love this new one", adding "I suppose one good [thing] though, doing all that [recording] stuff when I was young[er] is that I was going through those changes where you grow up [afterwards], so there was lots of write about."

=== Songs and lyrics ===
Lyrically, the album is described as more adult than Broken & Beautiful. Alexa also defends her decision to include profanity in the album's lyrics, something not used in her previous works, by stating that "people interpret what they want from the music" and adding "I was 16 and 17 when I wrote [Broken & Beautiful] and now I'm 24, so I guess it was just a natural progression and writing about different times in your life. The only thing it means is we need to have a warning sticker on the front because I say [the word] fuck. When I was writing it, with Tom Nichols, who I wrote 80% of the record with, he’d be like, 'If you're cool to write that then that's fine,' because I didn't want to be sitting there, going, 'Oh no, I can't do that because radio might not play it.' It’s a very honest record, but I'm really happy with it.". All the album's songs were inspired by Alexa's own life experiences; "Katie" is described as being "fun and introspective" and "examines the concept of perfection and how it differs from person to person", while "Addict" "captures how emotionally exhausting love can be with its insatiable desires", and the title track "explores the obsessiveness of being infatuated based on passing comments made by girlfriends".

== Track listing ==
No.	Title	Writer(s)	Producer(s)	Length
1.	"Addict"	Kate Alexa, Tom Nichols, Tim Baxter	Tom Nichols, Tim Baxter	3:10
2.	"Infatuation"	Kate Alexa, Tom Nichols, Iyiola Babalola, Darren Lewis	Tom Nichols, Future Cut	3:20
3.	"Katie"	Kate Alexa, Tom Nichols, Yann Mace, Luc Leroy	Tom Nichols	3:19
4.	"Crazy Little Thing"	Kate Alexa, Tom Nichols, Georgios Nakas, Klas Wahl	Tom Nichols	3:03
5.	"Not Enough"	Kate Alexa, Tom Nichols, Kyösti Sajakorpi	Tom Nichols	3:19
6.	"I Deny"	Kate Alexa, Tom Nichols, Georgios Nakas	Tom Nichols	4:03
7.	"X Rated"	Kate Alexa, Tom Nichols, Steve Young	Tom Nichols	3:42
8.	"I Don't Think So"	Kate Alexa, Tom Nichols, Georgios Nakas	Tom Nichols	3:29
9.	"Something You Say"	Kate Alexa, Tom Nichols, Steve Young	Tom Nichols	4:21
10.	"Buttercup"	Stuart Crichton, Paul Harris	Tom Nichols	2:55
11.	"We're Not Ready"	Kate Alexa, Tom Nichols, Steve Young	Tom Nichols	3:04
12.	"Fucked Up Me"	Kate Alexa, PJ Bianco, Michael Beck	PJ Bianco, Michael Beck	4:05
13.	"I'm Falling"	Kate Alexa, Stuart Crichton, Kara DioGuardi	Stuart Crichton	3:59

Japanese bonus track
No.	Title	Writer(s)	Producer(s)	Length
14.	"It's Alright"	Antonio Egizii, Kate Alexa, David Musumeci	DNA Songs	3:35
