= Penny Gray (disambiguation) =

Penny Gray (1958–2014) was an Australian field hockey player.

Penny or Penelope Gray may also refer to:

- Penny Gray, character in Adventures of Gallant Bess
- Penelope Gray, character in The Private Lives of Elizabeth and Essex

== See also ==
- Penni Gray, Australian actress
