= Always There =

Always There may refer to:

- Always There (Judith Durham album), 1997
- Always There (Marti Webb album), 1986
- "Always There" (Kate Alexa song), 2004
- "Always There" (Side Effect song), 1976
  - Covered by Incognito featuring Jocelyn Brown, 1991
- "Always There", a 2019 song by Greta Van Fleet
