= She's The Queen =

American electropop duo

- Genres: Pop, electropop, nu-disco, electro, indietronica
- Years active: 2009–present
- Label: electronic rumors
- Members: Emily White; Andrew 'Drew' Kuryloski
- Website: Official Website

She's The Queen are an American electropop duo based in New York City, with roots in both pop music and nu-disco. They released their début, self-titled EP in 2011 to [positive reviews, and signed to the newly-formed electronic rumors label.

== History ==
Having met at College in late 2009, She's The Queen (named after an episode of Wife Swap called "King Curtis") recorded their first tracks in Drew’s home studio above his garage. Early tracks from the band were picked up by many electronic and pop music blogs.

The duo released their self-titled debut EP in April 2011, The four track EP was well received by the online electronic music press. To promote the EP the duo performed live shows alongside the likes of Sky Ferreira and Simon Curtis.

In February 2012, She's The Queen signed with electronic rumors and will release their debut single for the label in the summer of that year.

== Line-up ==
=== Current members ===
Emily White - Vocals, Songwriting
Andrew 'Drew' Kuryloski - Keyboards, Programming, Songwriting & Production

== Discography ==
=== EPs ===
- She's The Queen (Self-Released 2011)

=== Compilation appearances ===
Various Artists - electronic rumors Volume 1 (Ninthwave Records/electronic rumors 2011) (featured the track "Waiting Game")

=== Featuring appearances ===
- Cosmonaut Grechko - "All I Hear" (featuring Emily White) (Schmooze 2011)
- Robots With Rayguns - "Get Over U" (feat. She's the Queen) (Fresh As It Gets, 2014)
