= List of H2O: Just Add Water episodes =

The following is an episode list for the Australian television show H_{2}O: Just Add Water, which first aired on Network Ten in Australia and has since been broadcast in more than 120 countries worldwide. Series one premiered in Australia on 7 July 2006 and series two began there on 28 September 2007. The third series premiered in the United Kingdom on 26 October 2009 while its Australian premiere occurred on 22 May 2010.

== Series overview ==
Series	Episodes	Originally released	
Series	Episodes	First released	Last released
1	26	7 July 2006	29 December 2006
2	26	28 September 2007	21 March 2008
3	26	26 October 2009	16 April 2010

== Episodes ==
=== Series 1 (2006) ===
Rikki Chadwick (Cariba Heine), Emma Gilbert (Claire Holt), and Cleo Sertori (Phoebe Tonkin) are three teenage girls who become stranded on the mysterious Mako Island. When they enter an underground pool of water that leads to the ocean they find themselves bathed in the glow of moonlight from overhead. After being rescued the girls return to their normal lives but soon discover they have changed: ten seconds after contact with water, they transform into mermaids. After further experimentation, they discover they also have unique supernatural powers over water. Emma can freeze water, Cleo can control the shape and volume of water, and Rikki can boil water. The girls enlist Cleo's long-time friend Lewis McCartney (Angus McLaren) to try to determine why this has happened to them and help them keep their new identity a secret. The series focuses on the girls dealing with everyday teen problems while trying to cope with their newfound abilities.

The first series features a single primary storyline with three main elements. The girls meet Louise Chatham (Christine Amor), an older woman who reveals that she too was once a mermaid. She helps the girls understand their own situation and warns them of the dangers involved. After a confrontation with Ms. Chatham, Zane Bennett (Burgess Abernethy) gets trapped on her sinking houseboat which forces Emma to rush to his aid. During the rescue, Zane catches a glimpse of her tail and becomes obsessed with finding this "sea monster". Doctor Denman (Lara Cox), a marine biologist, also becomes focused on the mermaids when Lewis accidentally leaves behind a genetic sample of the girls he was working on in her lab. Zane later helps her to capture the girls, unaware of their true identities. When he realises what he has done, Zane works with Lewis to free the girls who trick the scientists into believing they have given up their powers during a lunar eclipse. In reality, they were only temporarily removed of their powers.

No. overall	No. in series	Title	Directed by	Written by	Original release date	Prod. code
1	1	"Metamorphosis"	Colin Budds	Philip Dalkin	7 July 2006 (AUS); March 14, 2008 (Nickelodeon, U.S.)	101
Three fifteen-year-old girls—Rikki Chadwick, Emma Gilbert, and Cleo Sertori—find themselves stranded out at sea in a dinghy, and drift onto the beaches of Mako Island. Once there, they discover a hidden cavern, and inside it, a deep pool of water, sitting within the cone of a volcano. Realising that the pool has an underwater tunnel connected to the ocean, the girls step into the water and find themselves bathed in the light of the full moon as it passes over the top of the volcano. Little do they know, as they swim out of the tunnel and are rescued by the water police, that they have undergone a magical transformation, and their lives will never be the same again. Ten seconds after they touch water, they turn into mermaids. Cleo and Emma discover that they have powers to control water.
2	2	"Pool Party"	Colin Budds	Deb Cox	14 July 2006; March 14, 2008 (Nickelodeon, U.S.)	102
While Rikki enjoys her new life as a mermaid, Emma and Cleo are less enthusiastic about their mermaid powers. Emma's swimming career is in jeopardy, and Cleo feels isolated when she realises that she can't go to fashionable Miriam's pool party. Rikki soon gets fed up with their moaning, storms off and accidentally discovers a power of her own. Meanwhile, Cleo wants to tell her friend, Lewis, about her powers, but Emma and Rikki forbid it. However, Cleo might need his help after all when she takes a risk and attends Miriam's pool party, only to get thrown in the pool by prankster Zane Bennett and his pal Nate, just as Lewis arrives. Lewis discovers that the girls are mermaids but promises to keep their secret.
3	3	"Catch of the Day"	Colin Budds	Simon Butters	21 July 2006; March 16, 2008 (Nickelodeon, U.S.)	103
Emma and Rikki use their new-found abilities to free hatchling sea turtles caught in fishing nets. But when they shred one of the nets with a knife, they spark stories of sharks patrolling the waters. Meanwhile, Emma and Rikki have bad news for Cleo; the fishing boat that caught the turtle in its net was her father's. Refusing to believe that her father is illegally catching turtles, Cleo swims after his boat to investigate and at last accepts what she is. But the fishermen on board the boat mistake Cleo for a shark and catch her in their net. Emma and Rikki rescue her and Cleo is no longer afraid to swim in the water.
4	4	"Party Girls"	Colin Budds	Anthony Morris	28 July 2006; March 23, 2008 (Nickelodeon, U.S.)	104
A worried Emma cancels her annual sleepover party when she realises the risk of growing a tail in front of all her guests. She and Lewis travel back to Mako Island to try to find out how the girls were transformed into mermaids, and Emma finds a mysterious locket at the bottom of the Moon Pool, and thinks that it may be important. Meanwhile, Cleo gets a job at the marine park's dolphin tank, and Emma is furious with her for taking such risks around water. But Cleo's determination to lead a normal life without being scared of every drop of water she sees convinces Emma, who reschedules her sleepover. But there is trouble in store when Miriam, upset that she wasn't invited to Emma's party, gate crashes with Zane. At the party, Cleo gets water on herself, and has to hide in a closet, but when the other girls at the party open the door, she has already managed to zip herself up inside a sleeping bag. The girls, however, almost feel Cleo's tail, and she has to use her power to blow up the drinks as a distraction. Jealous Miriam then tries to steal Emma's locket, but Rikki stops her, and gives it back to Emma. Emma then gives it to Cleo, saying that a mermaid who can hide her tail in the middle of a party is more than capable of taking care of so important a locket. Also, Cleo is confused when she is approached at the marine park by a strange old woman who seems to know her secret.
5	5	"Something Fishy"	Colin Budds	Jo Watson	4 August 2006; March 30, 2008 (Nickelodeon, U.S.)	105
Cleo's secret diary falls into the hands of her younger sister, Kim. Kim grows suspicious when she reads in the diary that Cleo and her friends are mermaids, and shares her ideas with Emma's brother, Elliot. At first, Elliot doesn't believe her; but when Emma accidentally freezes his shower, Elliot becomes convinced that his sister is part of an evil mermaid cult. To put the kids off the scent, the girls decide to make them think that the diary is about someone else, and choose Miriam as their decoy, using their powers to make it look as though Miriam has powers of her own. Meanwhile, an oblivious Miriam enters the Miss Sea Queen pageant, and taunts Cleo, who decides to enter the pageant herself – unaware that Kim and Elliot are planning to shower the stage with water to expose Miriam and Cleo as mermaids. The plan ultimately fails and Miriam is humiliated. Meanwhile, Lewis goes to Mako Island to investigate the moon pool in order to find out how the girls became mermaids.
6	6	"Young Love"	Colin Budds	Sam Carroll	11 August 2006; April 6, 2008 (Nickelodeon, U.S.)	106
When Rikki saves Emma's brother Elliot from drowning, he develops a crush on her, and won't leave her alone. With Rikki getting annoyed, Emma and Cleo try to persuade her to let Elliot down gently; but with Rikki's fiery nature, that doesn't work too well, and an upset Elliot runs away. Rikki finds him at Lewis' brother's nursery plant school and apologises. However, they end up locked in and Rikki discovers that the sprinklers will wash the plants. The others must get them out before Rikki is transformed.
7	7	"Moon Spell"	Colin Budds	Max Dann	18 August 2006; April 13, 2008 (Nickelodeon, U.S.)	107
The strange old woman makes a reappearance at the marine park, and gives Cleo a mysterious warning not to look at the full moon. The other girls, however, are convinced the old woman is crazy, and ignore the warning, going ahead with Emma's planned surprise party for her father. At the party, however, Emma sees the reflection of the full moon in a bowl of punch, and then starts acting very strange, losing her inhibitions and being rude to the guests. Cleo, Rikki and Lewis try to keep her under control, but Emma ends up diving into the water, and turning into a mermaid. Worse still, when the others dry her off, her tail won't go away. How can they hide a mermaid in the middle of a party?
8	8	"The Denman Affair"	Colin Budds	Chris Anastassiades	25 August 2006; April 20, 2008 (Nickelodeon, U.S.)	108
Lewis gets a job as a lab assistant for Dr. Linda Denman, a beautiful marine biologist, and secretly plans to use her equipment to try to find out more about the girls' mermaid transformation. But he instead ends up putting their secret in danger, when he leaves a DNA sample from Cleo behind in the lab, and Dr. Denman discovers it. The girls realise that they are really in trouble when Cleo sneaks into Dr. Denman's lab, and discovers a scientific article on Dr. Denman's laptop about her unusual cell sample. With Lewis refusing to believe that Dr. Denman stole the cell sample from him (partly because he has a crush on her), Emma, Rikki and Cleo's secret could be about to be exposed to the world.
9	9	"Dangerous Waters"	Colin Budds	Anthony Morris	1 September 2006; April 27, 2008 (Nickelodeon, U.S.)	109
When one of Cleo's beloved fish dies, Rikki can't understand why she is so upset, and ends up offending her. To make up for it, Rikki uses her mermaid abilities to dive where no fish collector can dive, and picks Cleo a replacement fish. Back on dry land, however, she meets a man claiming to be a Marine Park breeder of rare fish, who offers to pay her good money for more rare fish specimens. Rikki takes the job, but when she sees one of the fish she caught in a pet tank in the JuiceNet cafe, she realises that the man who hired her does not really work for the Marine Park, and is actually selling the fish illegally for high profit. Rikki takes it upon herself to find the man, and deliver him to the police.
10	10	"The Camera Never Lies"	Colin Budds	Deb Cox	8 September 2006; May 4, 2008 (Nickelodeon, U.S.)	110
Lewis and the girls enter a short film contest held at the JuiceNet cafe, but Lewis, last year's champion, is fresh out of ideas. Rikki and Cleo are roped into doing a film about Emma's mother, but Rikki, thinking that the film is boring, sneaks off to shoot her own film, featuring some impressive underwater footage of sharks. Meanwhile, Zane, ineligible to compete himself, as his father is on the judging panel, recruits Lewis to shoot a film of him windsurfing around Mako Island, recreating (and hopefully beating), his father's windsurfing record of several years before. But things don't go to plan, when Zane falls off his windsurfer, right in the middle of Mako Island's shark breeding ground.
11	11	"Sink or Swim"	Colin Budds	Max Dann	15 September 2006; May 11, 2008 (Nickelodeon, U.S.)	111
Emma is flattered when local surfing hero, Byron, asks her to train him up for a swimming competition, but has to turn him down for obvious reasons. However, she changes her mind after learning that Zane is boasting to everyone that he will beat Byron by a mile, and begins training Byron without getting in the pool herself. But Byron is disappointed when Emma turns into a 'heavy training dragon', and the pair nearly fall out. Emma takes advice from her friends not to be so hard on Byron, but by being nice to him, she gives him the wrong idea, and they end up kissing. Meanwhile, Lewis continues his research on the girls, but Rikki does not like him treating her as a specimen, and tries to annoy him by disrupting his experiments.
12	12	"The Siren Effect"	Colin Budds	Susan MacGillicuddy	22 September 2006; May 18, 2008 (Nickelodeon, U.S.)	112
As another full moon approaches, Rikki pushes Cleo into a karaoke contest at the JuiceNet cafe, not realising that Cleo cannot sing. After embarrassing herself in front of everybody listening, Cleo heads back home with Emma, Rikki and Lewis to prepare for the full moon. But despite all their preparations, Cleo glimpses the moon in the reflection of some water in the bathroom sink, but when she touches the water, she doesn't turn into a mermaid. Cleo then stands before everyone in the house, and, to Rikki and Emma's surprise, sings with the most beautiful voice imaginable. Lewis realises that the full moon has turned Cleo into a siren – a mythological mermaid that used its mesmerising voice to lure sailors to their deaths. Cleo's voice, however, seems to be luring hundreds of teenage boys to her house, and under the spell of her voice, Lewis kisses her, and is thrown out by her father. It is then up to Emma and Rikki to keep Cleo out of trouble until the moon sinks; but, while they both sleep, Cleo phones up the local radio station, and gets her voice on the radio. The next day, the house is completely surrounded by teenage boys. They follow Cleo to the cafe where she sings, until the full moon sets and reveals her truly awful voice.
13	13	"Shipwrecked"	Colin Budds	Philip Dalkin	29 September 2006; May 25, 2008 (Nickelodeon, U.S.)	113
At the local boat yard, Emma finally meets the mysterious old woman who has been following Cleo around; Miss Chatham. And she finds her at just the right time, as Miss Chatham has an argument with Zane about an accident involving her houseboat ("Lorelei") and his jet ski, and then collapses from a heart attack. As she is taken away in an ambulance, Zane hears her muttering to Emma that she needs to protect her 'treasure'. Later, Emma invites the fragile Miss Chatham to stay with her, and she, Cleo and Rikki get to know her better. But upon hearing that she has been evicted from the boat yard, Miss Chatham sets off in the Lorelei before it can be taken away from her but she accidentally damages Zane's Jet Ski. Zane chases after her in his Zodiac pontoon boat, catches up with the Lorelei near Mako Island, and boards the Lorelei. He demands compensation for his damaged jet ski, but Miss Chatham passes out with another heart attack. Emma and Lewis arrive just in time to help Miss Chatham and take her to seek medical care on Lewis' boat. Zane stays aboard the Lorelei, searching for the treasure. Kerosene from a lamp ignites on the Lorelei's engine, and the boat begins to sink, trapping Zane. Emma is forced to dive down to the sinking boat in order to save Zane, and risks him discovering that she is a mermaid, but he just glimpses her tail before he passes out. Emma returns Miss Chatham's "treasure" to her, and it turns out to be a locket (identical to Cleo's), containing a picture of three teenage girls; herself and her friends Julia and Gracie, who were all mermaids back in the 1950s (Cleo's locket belonged to Miss Chatham's friend Gracie).
14	14	"Surprise!"	Jeffrey Walker	Chris Anastassiades	6 October 2006; May 25, 2008 (Nickelodeon, U.S.)	114
Cleo counts down the days to her sixteenth birthday, not with excitement, but with dread. Emma and Rikki can't understand Cleo's mood, until Lewis tells them about Cleo's father's embarrassing birthday parties. Meanwhile, Zane is determined to find the "sea monster" that saved him from drowning, and recruits Lewis to help him. But Lewis has promised the girls that he will keep Zane as far away from Mako Island and them as possible.
15	15	"The Big Chill"	Jeffrey Walker	John Armstrong	13 October 2006; May 27, 2008 (Nickelodeon, U.S.)	115
Emma is excelling at her new job at the JuiceNet café, and is delighted when Wilfred puts her in charge for a whole weekend. However, her skills and patience are put to the test when Cleo persuades her to hire slacker Rikki, who needs the money for concert tickets. But with Emma being a megalomaniac manager, and Rikki a lazy employee, things don't work out, and Rikki quits after Emma gives her a hard time for being rude to demanding customer Miriam. While the girls argue, the scheming Miriam sneaks into the JuiceNet's Cool Room, and turns up the temperature, in an attempt to get Rikki and Emma fired. Emma soon discovers that things in the Cool Room are thawing out, and uses her power to re-freeze them – but accidentally freezes Miriam at the same time.
16	16	"Lovesick"	Jeffrey Walker	Caroline O'Meara	20 October 2006; May 28, 2008 (Nickelodeon, U.S.)	116
Zane is relentlessly carrying on with his search for the mystery sea monster that saved his life, and tricks Cleo into giving him access to the marine park's library, so that he can learn more about sea creatures. Meanwhile, Cleo's friends and family become convinced that she has a secret boyfriend when she starts making odd phone calls and sneaking out of the house... unaware that she is only going to the marine park to care for a sick dolphin that seems to have a 'crush' on her.
17	17	"Under the Weather"	Jeffrey Walker	Max Dann	27 October 2006; May 29, 2008 (Nickelodeon, U.S.)	117
The girls are left housebound on the day of a big biology exam by a sudden rain storm. To keep Emma's mother from getting suspicious, the girls use their powers to fake illness (Rikki gives them high temperatures and red blotches on their skin, before Emma gives them low temperatures), but their plan backfires when Emma's mother calls a doctor, who is convinced that the girls have a rare tropical disease, and wants to send them to a hospital. Knowing that they would not last five minutes in the hospital without someone discovering their secret, the girls must try to think a way out of their elaborate lie... without getting into trouble with their families.
18	18	"Bad Moon Rising"	Jeffrey Walker	Sam Carroll	3 November 2006; May 30, 2008 (Nickelodeon, U.S.)	118
Haunted by his experience with the "sea monster", Zane presses on with his investigations, and is soon led to Mako Island. Meanwhile, on the night of another full moon, it is Rikki's turn to be moonstruck, when she glimpses the moon's reflection in a glass of water, and undergoes a catastrophic change; she loses control of her ability to heat water, and begins boiling everything around her. Distraught, Rikki runs away to Mako Island, and bumps into Zane. Feeling alone and frightened, she kisses him, but ends up hurting him with her power. Emma, Cleo and Lewis seek Miss Chatham's help.
19	19	"Hurricane Angela"	Jeffrey Walker	Anthony Morris	10 November 2006; June 1, 2008 (Nickelodeon, U.S.)	119
When Cleo's young cousin Angela comes to stay, Cleo's father gives Cleo the responsibility of taking care of her, hoping it will distract Cleo from arguing with her sister Kim. But taking care of Angela brings on challenges of its own, as it appears she is a spoiled brat, who is determined to get what she wants, and, worst of all, has a fondness for water. Rather than taking Angela to the beach to go body boarding, Cleo instead takes her to the safety of the marine park to look at the pelicans Kim is so fond of. But things soon turn bad, when Angela goes missing, and Cleo and the others find a pelican in her house, which Cleo accuses Kim of stealing from the marine park. The real thief turns out to be Angela, who used the pelican as a distraction so that she could go body boarding. As punishment, Cleo makes Angela clean up after the pelicans at the marine park.
20	20	"Hook, Line and Sinker"	Jeffrey Walker	Max Dann	17 November 2006; June 1, 2008 (Nickelodeon, U.S.)	120
Keen angler Lewis enters the annual fishing derby held by Cleo’s dad, with a secret weapon; a specially designed lure, that is actually hopeless at catching fish. With Nate and the rest of the contestants laughing at him, Cleo feels sorry for Lewis, and tries to help him by deliberately putting a huge fish on the end of his line. But her plan backfires when it is revealed that the fish she chose was a deep-sea tuna, a fish impossible to catch with an ordinary fishing rod from the shore. Lewis is accused of cheating, and is kicked out of the competition, leaving Cleo feeling guilty. She and Emma later put the same fish on the other contestants' lines to prove Cleo’s dad wrong, and Lewis is reinstated as the winner. Meanwhile, Rikki visits an investment seminar, and has an awkward meeting with Zane. But the pair are forced to talk to each other when they get trapped on a balcony. Zane reveals how his parents split up when he was younger, and Rikki discusses how her parents did as well when she was a child. They end up kissing before having a small confrontation with Zane's father.
21	21	"Red Herring"	Jeffrey Walker	Chris Anastassiades	24 November 2006; June 8, 2008 (Nickelodeon, U.S.)	121
When Byron makes an innocent comment about Emma being dependable, she misunderstands, and thinks he is saying she is boring. Deciding she needs a change, Emma asks Cleo to dye her hair, but is horrified when Cleo accidentally dyes it a bright red. However, the girls discover that, as Emma was a mermaid when she dyed her hair (as dyeing hair involves water), her hair only becomes red when she has her tail. Meanwhile, Zane's investigations into his sea monster mystery lead him to Miss Chatham, and he becomes convinced that she knows something. At first, the girls are unconcerned, as Zane has no evidence that Miss Chatham knows anything; but when they discover that Zane is planning to dive down to Miss Chatham's wrecked houseboat, Miss Chatham tells them of some old photographs of her and her mermaid friends, locked in a metal chest on board. Emma chooses to swim out to the wreck to salvage the photographs, before Zane finds them. But as she swims out of the wreck, Zane sees her (but luckily doesn't recognise her because of her red hair). When the girls find out that Zane now knows about mermaids, Rikki tracks Zane down and says she will be his girlfriend, provided he stops his mermaid hunt. She also warns him not to tell Emma or Cleo about them.
22	22	"Fish Out of Water"	Jeffrey Walker	Max Dann	1 December 2006; June 8, 2008 (Nickelodeon, U.S.)	122
Emma and Cleo are suspicious of Rikki when they see her apparently out on a date with Zane. After her friends pester her about it, Rikki finally confesses that she and Zane are going out, and Emma and Cleo, fearing that Rikki will tell Zane their secret, tell her to dump him. Rikki refuses, and she and the others fall out; but when Zane's father unveils plans to turn Mako Island into a holiday resort, and Zane fails to stand up to him, Rikki begins to wonder whether she made the wrong choice.
23	23	"In Too Deep"	Jeffrey Walker	Simon Butters	8 December 2006; June 15, 2008 (Nickelodeon, U.S.)	123
Rikki is amazed when she sees a locket in a jeweller's shop identical to Cleo's and Miss Chatham's. Miss Chatham reveals that the locket belonged to her friend Julia, the third original mermaid, and Rikki and the others begin searching for the money to buy it for her. But Zane makes a mistake when he lets slip to ex-girlfriend Miriam that Rikki was looking at the locket, and Miriam buys it just to spite her. But another problem comes to the girls' attention when Miss Chatham tells the story of how Julia – a girl with a fiery nature identical to Rikki's – trusted her wealthy boyfriend with her mermaid secret, only to have him betray her. She and the girls are worried that Rikki will make the same mistake of having too much trust in Zane, but when Zane retrieves the locket for Rikki after Miriam throws it in the water, they are relieved to see that she carefully dries the locket before touching it, meaning that she is not willing to share her secret with Zane. The girls give Julia's locket to Miss Chatham, but she gives it to Rikki, and then gives her own locket to Emma, saying that it is right that they are all together.
24	24	"Love Potion #9"	Jeffrey Walker	Anthony Morris	15 December 2006; June 15, 2008 (Nickelodeon, U.S.)	124
With the school's end of year dance approaching, Emma takes up the stressful job of heading up the dance committee. But, while the tough task of organising the dance is bad enough on her nerves, she is also flattened by the news that Byron, who she was hoping would ask her to the dance, is already going with Ice Queen Miriam. Cleo is also disappointed that Lewis is too caught up in his experiments to ask her to the dance, and, rather than go alone, she is forced to ask Nate. The only upside is that Lewis, after days of research and testing, has come up with a formula to make the girls' skin waterproof, and they no longer have to worry about getting wet. But, as the wise Miss Chatham declares, science and magic cannot mix, and Lewis' formula gives the girls an allergic reaction where their skin turns red, and they are forced to flee the dance. Things turn out well in the end, however, as Cleo finally admits to Lewis how she feels about him, and they become a couple.
25	25	"Dr. Danger"	Jeffrey Walker	Sam Carroll	22 December 2006; June 22, 2008 (Nickelodeon, U.S.)	125
Emma is forced to drop out of her family's annual holiday to a water park resort, which upsets her parents and annoys her little brother. But she and the other girls have much more to worry about, when Lewis and Cleo spot their old enemy Dr. Denman's boat anchored near Mako Island. Returning to follow up her discovery of cells that mutate on contact with water (a DNA sample from Cleo that Lewis accidentally left behind in her lab), Dr. Denman and her team of divers investigate Mako Island, and soon discover the Moon Pool – and what is worse, they also find a scale from one of the mermaids' tails. After performing some tests on the scale, Dr. Denman sees that it is identical to the cell sample she stole from Lewis, and realises that he is strongly connected to the whole thing. But she gets even closer to the girls' secret when she meets Zane, and hears his story of the mermaid he saw. At first, Dr. Denman doesn't believe a word Zane says; but when her underwater cameras set up around the entrance to the Moon Pool capture images of Emma, Rikki and Cleo, she and Zane's wealthy father team up to capture the mermaids (although they decide not to tell Zane that one of the mermaids is actually Rikki).
26	26	"A Twist in the Tail"	Jeffrey Walker	Philip Dalkin	29 December 2006; June 22, 2008 (Nickelodeon, U.S.)	126
Now that the mermaids have been identified, Dr. Denman continues her pursuit of them by holding Lewis hostage on her boat and using his mobile phone to lure the girls to the Moon Pool, where she traps them. After discovering that the three mermaids are in fact Rikki and her friends, Zane is left torn about where his loyalties lie; with his father, or with Rikki. Eventually, his conscience leads him to set Lewis and the girls free (much to his father and Dr. Denman's annoyance), but the mermaids are not out of trouble yet. Knowing that Dr. Denman and the scientists will still come after them, the girls must make a tough decision. Miss Chatham tells them of the forthcoming lunar eclipse, and says that, if they enter the Moon Pool when the eclipse passes over it, it will draw their powers away from them. As normal girls, the three of them would be of no interest to the scientists, and would be out of danger. The girls make the choice to enter the pool, and while their powers seem to vanish completely, the next morning they find they've become mermaids again: the eclipse only affected them for 12 hours.

=== Series 2 (2007–08) ===
A full moon, in conjunction with a rare planetary alignment, calls the girls to the moon pool at Mako Island where their powers are greatly augmented and strengthened. The second series revolves around the arrival of a new girl, Charlotte Watsford (Brittany Byrnes), who moves into the area and develops an instant attraction to Lewis. After Charlotte sees a film of her grandmother Gracie as a mermaid she meets Max Hamilton (Martin Vaughan) who was once romantically involved with Gracie. Happy to have met his lover's granddaughter, he tells her about the previous mermaids—Louise, Julia, and Gracie—and of Mako Island. Charlotte travels to the moon pool during a full moon and becomes the fourth mermaid in possession of all the girls' powers. Believing herself superior, she and the girls become sworn enemies. This conflict results in a confrontation during an especially powerful full moon, which ends with Charlotte being permanently stripped of her mermaid form and abilities.

Series two also focuses on the romantic entanglements of the girls. Cleo breaks up with Lewis for being too clingy and protective after which he dates Charlotte. Rikki and Zane start dating again after breaking up during the series one finale. Emma meets Ash (Craig Horner) and flirts with him but he is frustrated by the secrets she constantly holds back. She eventually relents and tells him that she is a mermaid. Torn because of the conflict between his friends and Charlotte, Lewis comes to the conclusion that his loyalties lie with the girls and with Cleo in particular. He breaks up with Charlotte and begins dating Cleo again.

No. overall	No. in series	Title	Directed by	Written by	Original release date	Prod. code
27	1	"Stormy Weather"	Jeffrey Walker	Philip Dalkin	28 September 2007	201
With Cleo's parents now divorced, Cleo is ordered by her father to take more care of Kim, starting with taking her to a concert. But on the night, Cleo, Rikki and Emma all accidentally see the full moon, and take off to Mako Island, with Lewis in hot pursuit. Once there, the girls undergo another magical transformation in the Moon Pool, as a rare planetary alignment intensifies the power of the full moon – Emma's power is enhanced so that she can produce snow and frost, Rikki can conjure lightning, and Cleo can now control wind as well as water. After the moonstruck girls nearly harm Lewis, they realise that they must work to control their new powers, before anyone else gets hurt.
28	2	"Control"	Jeffrey Walker	Max Dann	5 October 2007	202
A new girl, Charlotte Watsford, moves to the Gold Coast, and it is evident that she is developing a crush on Cleo's boyfriend, Lewis. But Charlotte may soon have her chance, as Cleo is getting fed up with Lewis' constant, smothering concern for her, and is considering breaking up with him. Meanwhile, the girls are still trying to learn how to control their powers, and Emma in particular is put to the test when she sees Elliot being bullied by a member of his soccer team. Furious when she sees the boy (Nate's little brother), shove Elliot in the middle of a game, Emma then executes total control of her newfound powers... by making the boy slip on a sheet of ice. But elsewhere, Cleo makes the tough decision to break up with Lewis.
29	3	"The One That Got Away"	Jeffrey Walker	Anthony Morris	12 October 2007	203
Rikki is bothered by Zane's reappearance on the Gold Coast, as she realises she still likes him. With Zane thinking that Rikki gave up her mermaid powers at the lunar eclipse during the war with Dr. Denman, can she manage to keep her secret from him for a second time? Meanwhile, Cleo grows jealous when she sees that Lewis and Charlotte are becoming close friends, and, in a mad rage, she steals Charlotte's diary... and discovers that she apparently already has a boyfriend named RJ. The episode ends with Zane rediscovering that Rikki is a mermaid, when Nate blasts her with water, but he promises not to tell anyone, and they rekindle their relationship. Cleo ends up embarrassing herself when she confronts Charlotte about her secret other boyfriend, and learns that the dates in the diary are meetings for Charlotte's theatre group (RJ stands for Romeo and Juliet).
30	4	"Fire and Ice"	Jeffrey Walker	Chris Anastassiades	19 October 2007	204
When Emma's parents head off to a crystal-wear convention, she is left in charge of the house, and invites Cleo to stay... but instead ends up with the messy and rebellious Rikki. However, when Rikki criticises Emma for being a control-freak, Emma sets out to prove that she can have fun too, and throws a wild party at her house. But she starts to regret her decision when the party gets out of hand. Meanwhile, Nate convinces Lewis that Cleo broke up with him because he wasn't manly enough, and offers to teach him judo. But the lessons are actually a ploy to keep Lewis away from Cleo, so that Nate can flirt with her.
31	5	"Hocus Pocus"	Jeffrey Walker	Kirsty Fisher	26 October 2007	205
Emma convinces Wilfred to shoot a TV commercial for the steadily failing JuiceNet cafe, but is taken aback when he asks her to star in it. Meanwhile, Lewis digs up an old book on mermaid magic, and with it, an alleged wish-granting potion. He and the girls brew up the potion in a storage room at the JuiceNet, but when it apparently doesn't work, a smug Rikki overheats the potion, causing it to grow into a foul fungus that begins to engulf the cafe. However, when Cleo takes home an untouched sample of the potion in order to make her father wish her mother return, she discovers that it does indeed work, but only when it is used by a mermaid.
32	6	"Pressure Cooker"	Jeffrey Walker	Simon Butters	2 November 2007	206
Cleo and Kim are concerned when it seems that their father has found a new girlfriend. With no desire for a step-mother, the girls are horrified when their father invites the woman over for dinner; but Cleo is even more horrified to discover that she is Charlotte's mother! Feeling that desperate times call for desperate measures, Cleo invites Rikki and Emma round, and persuades them to use their powers to ruin her father's dinner. Only afterwards do the girls realise their mistake; Charlotte's mother was a business associate of Cleo's father, interested in buying some of his catch.
33	7	"In Hot Water"	Jeffrey Walker	Joss King	9 November 2007	207
Cleo is fired from her job at the marine park for feeding Ronnie the dolphin the wrong food, but Emma and Rikki tell her not to worry, and that her boss will soon call her back. Unfortunately, Lewis, needing the money for a new computer, unknowingly takes Cleo's job, and she vows never to speak to him again. In an attempt to get Cleo her job back, Emma and Rikki use their powers to make Lewis' job ten times harder, but he soon finds them out, and sends them off. But, on their way out, the girls leave the marine park's underwater gate open, and Ronnie the dolphin escapes. When Lewis gets the blame, and his boss threatens to have him arrested, Emma and Rikki are forced to confess to Cleo, and the three of them search the ocean for Ronnie. After Ronnie is found, Lewis makes his boss apologize to him and give Cleo her job back, which she does.
34	8	"Wrong Side of the Tracks"	Jeffrey Walker	Sam Carroll	16 November 2007	208
While dirt biking through a caravan park, Zane and Nate spot a rundown Harley-Davidson motorcycle, and Nate steals the badge. A guilty Zane, however, tries to return the badge, but is caught by the owner, who thinks he is the thief. Zane has an argument with the man, and insults him... not realising that he is girlfriend Rikki's father, and that the caravan park is where Rikki lives; but she has been too embarrassed to admit it. When Zane finds out, he tells Rikki that he doesn't care where she comes from or how much money she has, but her father doesn't approve of Zane, and keeps them apart. Meanwhile, Cleo begins to suspect that Charlotte and Lewis are secretly going out.
35	9	"Riding for a Fall"	Jeffrey Walker	Susan MacGillicuddy	23 November 2007	209
When Emma's mother makes her take her brother Elliot for riding lessons, she ends up getting into a competitive conflict with the riding instructor, Ash (who Rikki and Cleo are convinced she has a crush on). However, Emma's stubbornness towards Ash lands her in trouble, when she ignores a warning from him, and accidentally lets his horse, Rebel, eat some poisonous weeds. Meanwhile, Lewis wins an award for young inventors, and asks Cleo to accompany him to the awards ceremony, but she declines, saying that they are just friends now. Lewis instead decides to take Charlotte as his date, but then Cleo changes her mind, and accepts Lewis' invitation, not realising that Charlotte is going in her place.
36	10	"Missed the Boat"	Jeffrey Walker	Max Dann	30 November 2007	210
Cleo is devastated when she fails a biology exam, and realises that it was all because she did not have Lewis to tutor her. Cleo's father then schedules Cleo a re-sit for the exam, and also finds her a new tutor... Charlotte. Determined to keep Cleo and Lewis apart, Charlotte sets Cleo a whole weekend of studying, and then takes Lewis to paint with her... on Mako Island. The girls try to stop Lewis from taking her there, but he refuses, thinking they are being paranoid. Cleo sneaks off from studying to go with Emma and Rikki to Mako, and try to keep Charlotte from discovering too much. But she ends up with her heart broken when she falls into a stream, and looks up to see Lewis kissing Charlotte (not realising that he only did it to stop Charlotte from seeing her as a mermaid).
37	11	"In Over Our Heads"	Jeffrey Walker	Anthony Morris	7 December 2007	211
Zane comes to Rikki with an offer to find a priceless Tibetan statue lost at the bottom of the ocean. The owners of the statue are offering a large reward for its return, but Rikki refuses, thinking that Zane is being greedy. But then she discovers that her father is in serious financial trouble, and when he tells her that they might have to leave the Gold Coast, Rikki agrees to find the statue with Zane, and persuades the others to help (without telling them that there is a reward involved). But when Emma and Cleo discover that the recovery of the statue was all about making money, they angrily leave, leaving Rikki and Zane to find the statue on their own. Rikki overworks herself, and ends up being struck on the head by the statue crate, and is knocked unconscious. Emma and Cleo rush back to help, but Lewis is held back by Charlotte, who switches his phone off to ensure that no one interrupts their time together.
38	12	"Fish Fever"	Jeffrey Walker	Philip Dalkin	14 December 2007	212
While out swimming, Emma collects a beautiful piece of coral for Cleo's new fish tank, but accidentally cuts herself on it. Soon after the coral is placed in the tank, however, Cleo's goldfish, Hector, starts behaving very strangely, and his scales begin to turn white. Stranger still, Emma seems to be suffering from the same illness, as she begins ravenously devouring fish, and her mermaid scales also turn white. Cleo and the others soon make the connection between Emma and Hector and the piece of coral (which turns out to be toxic), and Lewis takes Hector to the marine park to get an antidote (blowing off a date with Charlotte, who is convinced that Cleo wants to ruin her and Lewis' date). But things get complicated when an eerily changed Emma disappears into the pools of the marine park. Even worse, Emma sneaks to her house and eats the lobster while her parents are celebrating their wedding anniversary. However, her parents hear her inside, forcing the girls and Lewis to try to cure her before Emma's parents discover the situation. Emma returns to normal and ends up grounded when her parents see the lobster pieces around her.
39	13	"Moonwalker"	Jeffrey Walker	Chris Roache	21 December 2007	213
When Cleo's father revives the tradition of the Sertori family camping trip, two problems arise. Firstly, the trip is on Mako Island; secondly, it is a full moon. Emma, Rikki and Lewis tag along to help Cleo, and Charlotte annoyingly follows Lewis. Once on the island, the girls try to scare the campers off of it by telling Kim and Charlotte stories of monsters, and using their powers to freak them out. But when a nervous Kim climbs into the moonlight-proof tent Lewis has constructed for the girls, Cleo glimpses the full moon's reflection outside, and wanders off. When Emma and Rikki discover that Cleo is missing, they decide to face the power of the moon, and go out looking for her. Meanwhile, a moonstruck Cleo bumps into Charlotte out walking, who torments her, thinking that she is jealous of her new relationship with Lewis. But when Emma and Rikki (now also under the full moon's spell), see this, they frighten Charlotte away with their powers. Unfortunately, Charlotte runs straight into the cave where the moon pool is... just as the full moon passes over it. She sees the full moon's strange effect on the pool and is intrigued, but luckily Emma is able to stop her from touching the water by freezing the moon pool's surface, preventing Charlotte from becoming a mermaid.
40	14	"Get Off My Tail"	Colin Budds	Sam Carroll	28 December 2007	214
Cleo begins to realise that she misses spending time with Lewis, and asks her friends for advice. Rikki tells Cleo to re-establish her friendship with him, and use her unique mermaid abilities to her advantage – after all, Charlotte is just an ordinary girl, but Cleo is not. But Charlotte soon realises what Cleo is doing, and uses her bond with Lewis to make her rival jealous. Meanwhile, Wilfred leaves the Gold Coast, and Emma thinks that he has left the JuiceNet cafe to her, until the new manager shows up... and it is Ash, the cute riding instructor. Ash makes several quick changes to the cafe, which annoys Emma. But just as Emma is starting to accept Ash, some food gets stored in the wrong place and spoiled, and Ash, believing that it must have been Emma because she was the only one protesting about the changes, fires her. But he later finds out that it was another member of staff who simply got confused because of the quick changes, and gives Emma her job back after promising to remove some of the changes. He also asks her out on a date which she accepts.
41	15	"Irresistible"	Colin Budds	Chris Anastassiades	4 January 2008	215
Zane reads a myth about mermaids being attracted to ambergris (a substance found in whale droppings), and purchases a bottle of it from the internet. Lewis is not too keen on the idea (even though he realise it could be a chance to get back with Cleo), but he offers to look at the ambergris with Zane. The two are disgusted by the liquid's foul smell, and abandon the bottle on a table outside the JuiceNet cafe... where it is unfortunately found by the odious Nate, who apparently likes the smell, and sprays some on himself. But while everyone else retreats from Nate's smell, Emma, Rikki and Cleo seem drawn to him, and it doesn't take Lewis and Zane long to realise that Nate's popularity with the girls is due to the ambergris. Under its influence, the girls travel down to the beach with Nate, putting their secret in danger.
42	16	"Double Trouble"	Colin Budds	Simon Butters	11 January 2008	216
Lewis is being troubled by recurring nightmares of Cleo being exposed as a mermaid, and it is clear that he still has feelings for her. Meanwhile, Elliot surprises everyone by asking Kim out on a date, and Lewis and Cleo act as chaperones when they go to the marine park. However, Lewis' nightmare comes true when Cleo falls into the water, and someone spots her. Elsewhere, Emma grows suspicious when she discovers that Rikki has been having secret meetings with Ash... but it turns out the two of them were only planning to give her an award.
43	17	"Moonstruck"	Colin Budds	Philip Dalkin	18 January 2008	217
Unable to convince Emma to tell Ash the truth about herself, Rikki and Cleo encourage Ash to make a bold, romantic gesture to her. But he musters his courage at exactly the wrong time, when he cooks Emma a surprise dinner at her home on the night of a full moon. By leaving the front door open, he doesn't realise the chaos he is about to cause, when Cleo accidentally looks up at the moon. The mischievous, moonstruck Cleo then forces Rikki to see the full moon, and the two of them plot to get Emma wet, so that Ash can see her in mermaid form. However, Lewis shows up, preventing Ash from seeing Emma as a mermaid. Absent: Brittany Byrnes as Charlotte Watsford
44	18	"The Heat is On"	Colin Budds	Philip Dalkin	25 January 2008	218
With the arrival of the girls' one year anniversary as mermaids, Cleo organises a party at Mako Island to celebrate. But when Zane accidentally spills some drinks on Emma at the cafe, he is forced to have an argument with Ash to stop him from seeing her as a mermaid. Overhearing Zane calling her a 'clumsy waitress', Emma doesn't realise he is only trying to help her, and gives him the cold shoulder. This leads to Emma and Zane's girlfriend Rikki becoming enemies, and it looks like there will be no party at Mako Island, which upsets Cleo. Meanwhile, Lewis feels guilty when he realises he hasn't been spending much time with Charlotte.
45	19	"The Gracie Code, Part One"	Colin Budds	Max Dann	1 February 2008	219
While doing some research on Mako Island, Lewis uncovers the work of Max Hamilton, who, fifty years before, was also investigating the place. Realising that his findings could be the key to finding out more about the Moon Pool and the girls' transformation, Lewis tries to befriend the old man, but finds him unwilling to talk... until, that is, he sees Cleo talking to Lewis, and recognises the locket around her neck. Max follows Lewis and Cleo to Mako Island, splashes some water on Cleo, and discovers that she is a mermaid as well. He is not shocked, however, because Max was a friend of Miss Chatham's when she was a mermaid along with Gracie and Julia Dove in the 1950s, and was romantically involved with Gracie. Max promises to keep Cleo's secret, and hands his research on Mako Island to Lewis. Absent: Claire Holt as Emma Gilbert
46	20	"The Gracie Code, Part Two"	Colin Budds	Anthony Morris	8 February 2008	220
Sifting through Max's research on Mako Island, the girls discover an old reel of film, and a photograph of his beloved Gracie. But elsewhere, Charlotte wants answers as to why Lewis is spending so much of his time with Cleo, Emma and Rikki, and storms over to Cleo's house. Whilst there, she sees the photo of Gracie in amongst Max's papers, and the girls are all stunned when Charlotte reveals that she is Gracie's granddaughter. Lewis is then given the task of finding out just how much Charlotte knows about her grandmother, but his questions only make her more suspicious, and, thinking that Lewis and the girls are hiding something from her, she goes back to Cleo's house, and steals the old reel of film in amongst the research. After getting the film transferred on to a DVD, Charlotte watches it, and finds that it is a home movie of her grandmother, Gracie, as a mermaid. Meanwhile, Ash makes a well-intentioned attempt to help Emma overcome her apparent fear of water, which leads to him almost discovering her secret.
47	21	"And Then There Were Four"	Colin Budds	Susan MacGillicuddy	15 February 2008	221
Charlotte is determined to find out whether or not her grandmother was truly a mermaid, and follows Lewis to Max when he goes to give the research back. Max is delighted to meet the granddaughter of his beloved Gracie, and, not realising that Charlotte is a threat to Emma, Rikki and Cleo, tells her everything. With the girls unaware that Charlotte now knows about them, and also preoccupied with the arrival of the full moon, they are unable to stop her from travelling back to Mako Island and diving into the moon pool just as the full moon passes. The next day, she tells Lewis that she has become a mermaid.
48	22	"Bubble, Bubble, Toil and Trouble"	Colin Budds	Sam Carroll	22 February 2008	222
Lewis tells the girls that Charlotte is a mermaid. Although they are unhappy that Charlotte has become the fourth mermaid of Mako Island, they decide to welcome her into their group and befriend her. The perfect opportunity comes when the four of them are placed on the school's beach volleyball team to stop them from failing gym class (as they have been avoiding swimming lessons). But, although the girls do form a bond, Emma, Rikki and Cleo still have reservations about Charlotte, when it is revealed that she possesses all three of their mermaid powers, and declares herself a "super mermaid".
49	23	"Reckless"	Colin Budds	Max Dann	29 February 2008	223
When the girls offer to help Charlotte learn how to control her new-found powers, she rejects them, thinking that they are trying to cut her off from her full potential. Charlotte's powers soon go to her head, as she declares herself the only "real" mermaid, and recklessly uses her powers in public. After almost killing Ronnie the dolphin in a fit of panic, she then tries to get revenge on Nate when he attacks Lewis, and it takes all the girls' effort to stop her. Will Charlotte's lack of control mean the exposure of the mermaids' secret?
50	24	"Three's Company"	Colin Budds	Sam Carroll	7 March 2008	224
Charlotte takes control of the planning for Lewis' birthday party, and refuses to let any of the other girls help, claiming to "know Lewis even better than he knows himself". Rikki, fed up with Charlotte's intrusion into what was once their close-knit group, decides to exclude herself, and leaves to spend more time with Zane. Meanwhile, at the boring birthday party that Charlotte has organised for Lewis, Charlotte jealously locks Cleo and Emma in a flooded storage room, where they are left trapped as mermaids. Their secret is threatened when Ash hears them in the storage room and tries to unlock the door, only for Zane and Rikki to arrive in time to help. Zane leads Ash away whilst Rikki uses her powers to dry the girls. Realising what Charlotte has done, the girls then organise a party boat to come and take Lewis from Charlotte's terrible party, and then tell Charlotte that she is not one of them any more.
51	25	"Sea Change"	Colin Budds	Robert Armin	14 March 2008	225
Charlotte's short-lived friendship with Emma, Rikki and Cleo is over, and she forbids Lewis to talk to them. When Cleo shows concern for him, Charlotte lies to her, saying that Lewis willingly gives Cleo the cold shoulder because he doesn't care about her anymore. A fight leads to Charlotte taking Cleo's locket, and when Lewis does nothing (believing that Cleo gave the locket to Charlotte, because it was her grandmother's), an upset Cleo is convinced that Lewis is on Charlotte's side, and leaves a phone message for him (which he doesn't hear, as Charlotte has stolen his phone), about how he has abandoned her and wants nothing to do with her, before running away from home. When Lewis eventually hears Cleo's message, he angrily breaks up with the venomous Charlotte and races after Cleo. Meanwhile, Cleo is being hunted by a pack of sharks, who can sense that she is weak. Lewis arrives just in time to save her, and the two of them get back together. Unfortunately, by choosing Cleo over Charlotte, Lewis has created an even bigger enemy in Charlotte.
52	26	"Unfathomable"	Colin Budds	Chris Roache	21 March 2008	226
A rare full moon with the power to strip away the girls' powers permanently is approaching. The girls attempt to forewarn Charlotte, but Charlotte instead uses her powers against them out of spite. She releases her hold on them once Ash comes out of JuiceNet; Emma attempts to make Ash forget what he saw, but not giving up, he visits her that night to try to get an explanation. Charlotte, still bitter, controls the water in Emma's house from the outside, and the girls cannot fight back unless they end up revealing their secret to Ash. When Cleo follows Lewis and Charlotte to Mako Island, Rikki and Emma join her as well. Cleo, Rikki and Emma have a power battle with Charlotte, in which Charlotte loses both the battle and her powers. The following morning, Lewis retrieves the locket from Charlotte, Emma shows her secret to Ash, and the season closes with the girls running into the ocean while their boyfriends look on. Note: Final appearance of Claire Holt, Brittany Byrnes, and Craig Horner

=== Series 3 (2009–10) ===
The third series begins with Cleo and Rikki dealing with the loss of Emma who is travelling the world with her family. New characters are introduced including Bella Hartley (Indiana Evans), a singer and mermaid since the age of nine with the power to turn water into gelatine; and Will Benjamin (Luke Mitchell), a skilled diver who is trying to figure out the secrets of Mako Island and who accidentally seems to unleash a powerful force which turns water against the mermaids. The girls must also deal with Zane, who attempts to exploit the moon pool after Rikki breaks up with him.

No. overall	No. in series	Title	Directed by	Written by	Original release date	Prod. code
53	1	"The Awakening"	Jeffrey Walker	Joss King	26 October 2009 (UK)	301
Rikki and Cleo are about to face their final year of high school without Emma, who has gone travelling with her family. The JuiceNet cafe has now closed down and is just a vacant building on the coastline until Zane buys it and persuades Rikki to reopen it with him, renaming the cafe Rikki's in honour of her. At the cafe's opening night, Cleo and Rikki meets Bella Hartley, a new girl in town who does Rikki a favour by singing for her in Nate's band. That same night, free-diver Will discovers the Moon Pool and witnesses the full moon's effect on it. A strange creature made entirely of water forms and attacks Will. It then races to the cafe and kidnaps Rikki, dragging her back to Mako Island. To Cleo's horror, this all happens in front of Bella, but she has no choice but to dive in and rescue Rikki. However, Bella dives in after her, revealing that she is also a mermaid. Together, Cleo and Bella rescue Rikki from the water tentacle. Bella befriends Rikki and Cleo and the new trio is determined to find out what caused water to turn against them. Note: Claire Holt left the series to film Messengers 2: The Scarecrow. Indiana Evans and Luke Mitchell join the main cast.
54	2	"Jungle Hunt"	Jeffrey Walker	Anthony Morris	27 October 2009 (UK)	302
First day back at school, and the girls are surprised to discover that Will is attending too. Will is thrilled to see them, and asks for help relocating the Moon Pool, so that he can investigate what happened to him during the full moon. Bella (obviously smitten with Will), offers to help him, but promises the others that she will keep him away from the Moon Pool; but a suspicious Rikki follows her. Meanwhile, Lewis and Cleo are convinced that something has happened to change the Moon Pool, but can't figure out what.
55	3	"Keep Your Enemies Close"	Jeffrey Walker	Sam Carroll	28 October 2009 (UK)	303
Bella is pleased and Rikki wary when Cleo applies for a new job as an assistant dolphin trainer at the marine park. But she is soon in over her head, when Will visits the park, and takes a swim with Ronnie, and his influence has the dolphin performing tricks that he has never done before. However, head dolphin trainer Laurie mistakenly thinks that it is Cleo making Ronnie perform the tricks, and offers her a spot in the marine park's dolphin show. Meanwhile, Rikki fires the live band from the cafe after hearing Nate's terrible new song, but Bella gets the wrong end of the stick, and thinks that Rikki fired the band because she has an issue with her.
56	4	"Valentine's Day"	Jeffrey Walker	Simon Butters	29 October 2009 (UK)	304
Valentine's Day comes to the Gold Coast, and the girls all seem to be having trouble with love. Rikki finds that the stress of running the cafe is destroying her relationship with Zane, Bella's crush on Will deepens, but she finds it hard to tell him of her feelings, and Cleo is less than impressed with Lewis' idea of a Valentine's date; fishing. Even Kim is having serious 'boy trouble'. The only person who does seem to be having any luck in love is Cleo's father, Don, who falls for a pretty marine licensing inspector named Samantha. But it seems that he has blown his chance when she gets knocked overboard.
57	5	"Big Ideas"	Jeffrey Walker	Philip Dalkin	30 October 2009 (UK)	305
Zane's management style is steering the cafe into debt, and Rikki is not impressed with his new idea to hold a dirt bike race at the cafe to bring in more money. Zane has promised to give the winner of the race a prize of $1000, but, knowing full well that he is the best biker in town, enters the competition himself, so that he won't have to hand out the money. But he starts to doubt himself when experienced dirt biker Will enters the race after encouragement from Bella, and so enlists Nate to help him cheat. Meanwhile, Lewis and Cleo continue with their investigations on the Moon Pool, and make an amazing discovery when they mix water from the new waterfall with water from the pool.
58	6	"Secrets & Lies"	Jeffrey Walker	Simon Butters	2 November 2009 (UK)	306
As Bella grows more and more fond of Will, she tries to set up a study date so that they can spend some time together, but is hurt to find herself stood up. Furious, she goes to Will's boatshed to confront him, and is devastated to find him there with another girl. Meanwhile, Lewis' science teacher, Ms. Taylor, is impressed by Lewis' science project – not realising that it is actually his apparatus for studying the floating water from the Moon Pool. Lewis is then forced to show his experiment in class, putting the secret of the Moon Pool and the mermaids in danger. Ignoring Rikki's advice, Bella follows Will and the mystery girl on a diving trip, and they nearly see her, but Bella is relieved when she discovers that the girl is Will's sister, Sophie. Cleo uses her power to help Lewis replicate the effect of the floating Moon Pool water, and he submits an alternative science project, keeping the mermaids' secret safe.
59	7	"Happy Families"	Jeffrey Walker	Max Dann	3 November 2009 (UK)	307
Cleo and Kim's father Don takes them to the beach to get to know his new girlfriend, Sam. But while Cleo is willing to accept her for her father's sake, Kim hates her from the start, but uses the situation to get expensive gifts out of her father as bribes for her approval, much to Cleo's disgust. But Sam and Don get the wrong idea when Cleo refuses to go swimming with Sam, and think that Cleo is the one who has a problem with her. Meanwhile, Bella applies for a job at the cafe, and Rikki is keen to give it to her... except Zane wants to give the job to Will's ambitious sister, Sophie. Absent: Angus McLaren as Lewis McCartney
60	8	"Kidnapped"	Jeffrey Walker	Chris Roache	4 November 2009 (UK)	308
The girls prepare to sleep over at Cleo's for the full moon, to try to protect themselves from any water attack. Lewis makes preparations of his own by installing cameras in the Moon Pool cavern, in an attempt to capture the mysterious water tentacle on film, and learn more about how it is created. Will, meanwhile, decides to revisit the Moon Pool to continue with his investigations there, and drops by Cleo's to ask Bella to come with him. But Bella isn't there – she has been kidnapped by the water tentacle! Rikki and Cleo race to Mako Island to save her, while Lewis tries to keep Will away. At Mako, Rikki and Cleo discover that the tentacle seems to be turning Bella into water. But when they manage to pry her away from the tentacle, Bella says that she felt safe when she was with it.
61	9	"The Sorcerer's Apprentice"	Jeffrey Walker	Philip Dalkin	5 November 2009 (UK)	309
When Lewis tells Cleo not to experiment with the floating water they collected from Mako, she cannot resist, and sends Lewis off for a day of golfing with her father, so that he won't discover her. But when Rikki accidentally gets the water in Cleo's fish tank, her goldfish, Hector, becomes imprisoned in a bubble of floating water! The girls' attempts to free Hector result in him going down the drain, and they must use their mermaid abilities to retrieve him from the canal. Also, the girls try to keep Will, who is in the house while looking for Bella with whom he has to do a project for school, from seeing Hector. Meanwhile, somewhere on the golf course, Lewis is pretending to lose to Cleo's father at golf, so that he can get into his good books.
62	10	"Revealed"	Jeffrey Walker	Sam Carroll	6 November 2009 (UK)	310
When Rikki and Cleo realise that Will has made a connection between Bella, Mako, and the full moon, they warn Bella to stay away from him, but she can't. Will is also growing incredibly interested in her, and wants to spend time with her; but when he realises that Bella won't swim, he deliberately spills some water on her, thinking her secret might be something to do with water. In a panic, Bella dives into the water, but Will follows her... and discovers that she is a mermaid. Afterwards, Bella tells Will how she became a mermaid. Can he keep her secret?
63	11	"Just a Girl at Heart"	Jeffrey Walker	Anthony Morris	18 January 2010 (UK)	311
Will's ruthless sister, Sophie, is training him to be a professional free-diver, only he'd rather spend time swimming with Bella. Irritated, Sophie tells Bella to stay away from Will, as she sees her as a distraction for him, but Bella doesn't listen. While watching Will train in a public pool, Bella dives in to help him with his swimming technique... just as Sophie turns up. Although Will manages to hide her, Bella is still worried, not about Sophie, but about Will. She thinks he only likes the mermaid side of her. Meanwhile, Rikki comes up with a brilliant idea to hold corporate events at the cafe, but after Zane makes a mistake with the booking, the cafe is overrun by a wild children's party. Absent: Angus McLaren as Lewis McCartney
64	12	"Crime & Punishment"	Jeffrey Walker	Max Dann	19 January 2010 (UK)	312
On Rikki's birthday, Cleo and Bella travel to the Moon Pool, and make her a present using their powers; an elegant mermaid statue that Cleo moulds from water, and Bella hardens with her gelatine power. But when Will discovers the unusual present on Rikki's desk, he suspects that Cleo and Rikki know Bella's mermaid secret. Meanwhile, Sophie takes it upon herself to organise the cafe's first food delivery order, and sends Will to make the delivery, but he comes back with a payment of fake dollar bills. Realising that something is amiss, Rikki returns the fake bills to the address – a houseboat in the middle of nowhere – and discovers that the people on board are printing counterfeit money. When the criminals kidnap her on board the boat, Rikki manages to get a desperate message to Cleo and Bella, before her captors take her phone, and Bella and Cleo get Will to tell them where Rikki has gone – but not before he makes them admit that all three of them are mermaids. Realising that they must now all trust each other, Cleo, Bella and Will set off together to save Rikki.
65	13	"To Have & to Hold Back"	Jeffrey Walker	Simon Butters	21 January 2010 (UK)	313
The day of Don and Sam's wedding arrives, and selfish Kim tries to ruin everything. Meanwhile, Lewis gets the chance to spend three years working at a scientific research centre in America, but frets about telling Cleo... until Kim tells her for him. Cleo is distraught, thinking that Lewis planned to leave without telling her, and refuses to talk to him. Don and Sam's big day is then completely ruined when Kim turns on the sprinklers (nearly making Cleo, Rikki and Bella grow tails in front of everyone). In the end, Lewis tells Cleo that he is not going to America because he loves her, and Cleo forgives him. But she decides to let him go after all, and they part promising to see each other again. The girls organise another wedding ceremony for Don and Sam on Mako Island, and Kim at last warms to Sam. Note: Angus McLaren's final episode as a regular
66	14	"Mermaid Magic"	Colin Budds	Anthony Morris	22 February 2010 (UK)	314
Cleo finds an unusual crystal in a rock from the Moon Pool, identical to the one in Bella's necklace, which she collected from the Moon Pool in which she was transformed. Could this be the source of Moon Pool magic? Meanwhile, after discovering that Zane cheated in a free-diving competition, Will challenges him, and dives to a depth of 60 metres. But Will pushes himself too hard, and ends up passing out, forcing Rikki to dive down and save him.
67	15	"Power Play"	Colin Budds	Anthony Morris	23 February 2010 (UK)	315
After seeing the work done at the marine park by the charity Dolphin Rescue, Bella comes up with an idea to hold a fundraising event for them at the cafe, but is deflated when Sophie overhears, and steals her idea, presenting it to Rikki and Zane as her own. What is more, as Sophie is organising the event, she spitefully refuses to let Bella and the band perform. But she gets into trouble with Rikki and Zane, when all of the bands she has booked instead of Bella's pull out, after hearing that Sophie has tried to make Dolphin Rescue pay a fee for the concert. Sophie is fired from the cafe, and Bella and the band perform to save the night. Meanwhile, Cleo, Sam, and Kim have difficulties sharing the bathroom, until Sam realizes what Kim is up to and finds a way to repay her for Cleo after Kim gets her in trouble.
68	16	"The Dark Side"	Colin Budds	Sam Carroll	24 February 2010 (UK)	316
Frustrated by the water tentacle's constant attacks on them, Rikki travels to Mako Island at the full moon in order to confront it. With Bella and Cleo delayed, Will hurries after Rikki, but instead of finding the tentacle attacking her, he finds her somehow controlling it. Rikki appears to form some sort of connection with the tentacle, but when the full moon passes, she makes Will swear not to tell Bella or Cleo what happened.
69	17	"A Magnetic Attraction"	Colin Budds	Sam Carroll	25 February 2010 (UK)	317
Cleo is introduced to Ryan, a geophysicist working for Sam. Thinking that he might be able to help, Cleo shows him the magnetic crystal rock she found at Mako, which infuriates Rikki, who thinks that Cleo is putting their secret at risk. Cracks are beginning to form in the girls' relationship, and Cleo and Bella become worried when Rikki starts spending all of her time in the Moon Pool. This prompts Will to confess to them what happened on the night of the full moon when Rikki confronted the tentacle. Back at the Moon Pool, Rikki discovers that bonding with the tentacle has strengthened her powers.
70	18	"Into the Light"	Colin Budds	Sam Carroll	12 April 2010 (UK)	318
Kim lets slip to geophysicist Ryan that Cleo and the others spend a lot of time on Mako Island, and Ryan goes there in search of more magnetic rocks like the one Cleo showed him. Rikki discovers this, and tries to warn the others that Ryan is on to them, but Bella and Cleo don't believe her, as they are beginning to lose trust in Rikki. Rikki goes to Mako Island herself (with Will tailing her), and uses her powers to destroy Ryan's equipment, but when she starts going too far, Will springs out, and stops her. The two of them are then forced to run and hide in the Moon Pool cavern when Ryan hears them and chases after them, but this leads to Ryan accidentally discovering the Moon Pool. Rikki forces Ryan out with her powers, but Will tells her that she has only made things worse. Realising that he is right, Rikki apologises, and, when she arrives home, reconciles with the others, and tells them of her experience with the tentacle, and how it has affected her. Rikki says she doesn't think the tentacle is trying to harm them, which opens up a new mystery. The girls must also figure out how they are going to put Ryan off the scent.
71	19	"Breakaway"	Colin Budds	Anthony Morris	13 April 2010 (UK)	319
Will is getting sick of Sophie's pressuring him into competitive free-diving, but agrees to compete in a competition to set a new depth record. Sophie is delighted with Will's record breaking dive of 80 metres, but after the competition, Will gives up competitive free-diving to shrug off Sophie's influence. As Will sets his record, however, Rikki witnesses Sophie and Zane kissing, and her relationship with Zane is ended.
72	20	"Queen for a Day"	Colin Budds	Samantha Strauss	13 April 2010 (UK)	320
After breaking up with Zane, Rikki leaves the cafe in order to get away from him, and Zane re-hires Sophie as the new manager. Thrilled with her new position, Sophie immediately starts making changes to the cafe, and hires Cleo's sister Kim as a waitress. Meanwhile, Will's new after shave gives Bella a sneezing allergy, which also inadvertently triggers her powers. Unable to perform without sneezing (and unleashing her mermaid powers on everyone), Bella is close to being fired from the cafe by the brutal Sophie.
73	21	"The Jewel Thief"	Colin Budds	Simon Butters	14 April 2010 (UK)	321
Since saving his life when he passed out during a dive, Rikki has formed a close friendship with Will, and is touched when he makes her a necklace, similar to Bella's, using the magnetic crystal found on Mako Island. Rikki and Bella experiment with their crystals, and are fascinated by how they react when near each other; the crystals produce a blue glow that mesmerises the girls, similar to the effect of a full moon, and, when actually touched together, they release a powerful energy burst, that causes an electrical blackout! The girls decide to keep the crystals apart until they learn more about them, and Rikki leaves hers with Will. But a jealous Zane, mistakenly thinking that Rikki and Will are going out, breaks into Will's boatshed, and steals the necklace. A furious Rikki gets it back from him, and tells him once again that their relationship is over. Will makes another necklace for Cleo, and the girls wear them as a symbol of their friendship.
74	22	"Mako Masters"	Colin Budds	Philip Dalkin	14 April 2010 (UK)	322
A stressed out Cleo is trying to plan study sessions for the girls' final exams, but Bella and Rikki are more preoccupied with finding out about the tentacle. The girls are forced to make a quick exit when, during their science exam, the full moon rises early, and the tentacle tries to reach them through a water cooler in the classroom. They travel to Mako Island, and confront the tentacle, this time without fear, and realise that it is not trying to harm them, but get a message to them. The girls all place their crystal necklaces in a hole in the cave wall, triggering a projection to appear in the air. The girls watch it, and see a comet travelling towards the Earth, but before they can watch the whole message, Zane and Will interrupt them, and the projection stops. The girls are confused as to whether the Moon Pool was showing them the past (the creation of the Moon Pool itself), or the future.
75	23	"Beach Party"	Colin Budds	Anthony Morris	15 April 2010 (UK)	323
The Gold Coast is playing host to a massive beach party, and Bella wants to ask Will if he will go with her. But she is upset when she misunderstands a conversation she hears between Rikki and Will, and thinks that they are going together. Bella then has no alternative but to ask Nate, which confuses Will (as he was about to ask her). Things are straightened out at the party, however, when Zane tells Will to stay away from Rikki, and Will exclaims that he likes Bella. Bella and Will become a couple. Meanwhile, Sophie is trying to persuade Zane to change the name of the cafe.
76	24	"Too Close for Comfort"	Colin Budds	Max Dann	15 April 2010 (UK)	324
When Kim demands an expensive holiday, Cleo's father gets a second job doing a pirate show at the marine park, so that he can afford it. At first, Cleo is worried that her father will humiliate himself; but when the dolphin shows start emptying out, Cleo realises that her father is more popular than she thought, and his shows threaten to end Cleo's job. Meanwhile, there is trouble between Bella and Will, when they struggle to find things in common.
77	25	"A Date with Destiny"	Colin Budds	Chris Roache	16 April 2010 (UK)	325
The girls find a way to simulate a full moon, so that they can finish watching the message the Moon Pool was trying to show them. They discover that the comet they saw is being drawn towards the Earth by the Moon Pool's magnetic pull, and is going to hit Mako Island. The girls must try to harness the power of Mako Island's magnetic crystals to force the comet away, and save the Earth. Meanwhile, the cafe is in danger of going bankrupt, and Sophie is searching for ways to earn more money. She gets her chance when Ryan (who is annoyed that Sam has ended his research on Mako Island), spots the crystal in Bella's necklace, and tells her that it might be valuable. After finding out where Will got the crystal from, Sophie leads Ryan to Mako Island (with a reluctant Zane close behind), and they discover the magnetic crystals in the walls of the Moon Pool cave.
78	26	"Graduation"	Colin Budds	Joss King	16 April 2010 (UK)	326
By harvesting the magnetic crystals, Zane, Sophie and Ryan have severely damaged the Moon Pool, and the girls find that it no longer has enough power to push the incoming comet away from the Earth. All seems lost, but Bella, Cleo and Rikki band together, and use their own magic to create a tower of water and light, that knocks the comet off course, making it miss the Earth. With the Earth saved, the girls then graduate from school, and Lewis returns for the ceremony and reunites with Cleo. Everyone then celebrates in the Cafe with Rikki and Zane back on speaking terms, and the show ends with Bella performing the theme song. Guest starring: Angus McLaren as Lewis McCartney

== Compilation TV films ==
Title	Original release date
H_{2}O: Just Add Water – The Movie	8 June 2007
This TV movie summarised the events of the beginning of series one using clips from the episodes "Metamorphosis", "Pool Party", "Catch of the Day", "Party Girls", "Lovesick", "The Denman Affair" and "The Siren Effect".
H_{2}O: Metamorphosis	14 March 2008
In the United States "Metamorphosis" and "Pool Party" premiered as a one-hour movie.
H_{2}O: Exposed	20 June 2008
In the United States "Dr. Danger" and "A Twist in the Tail" premiered as a one-hour movie called "Exposed".
H_{2}O: Just Add Water – And Then There Were Four	7 September 2008
In some countries, such as Hungary, Romania and Bulgaria, the episodes "The Gracie Code (Part 1)", "The Gracie Code (Part 2)" and "And Then There Were Four" are combined into a 70-minute television movie. This version aired only in Central and Eastern Europe on Jetix.
H_{2}O: Just Add Water – The Finale	7 September 2008
In some countries, such as Hungary, Romania and Bulgaria, the episodes "Three's Company", "Sea Change" and "Unfathomable" are combined into a 70-minute television movie. This version aired only in Central and Eastern Europe on Jetix.
