= Sullivan Stapleton =

Australian actor (born 1977)

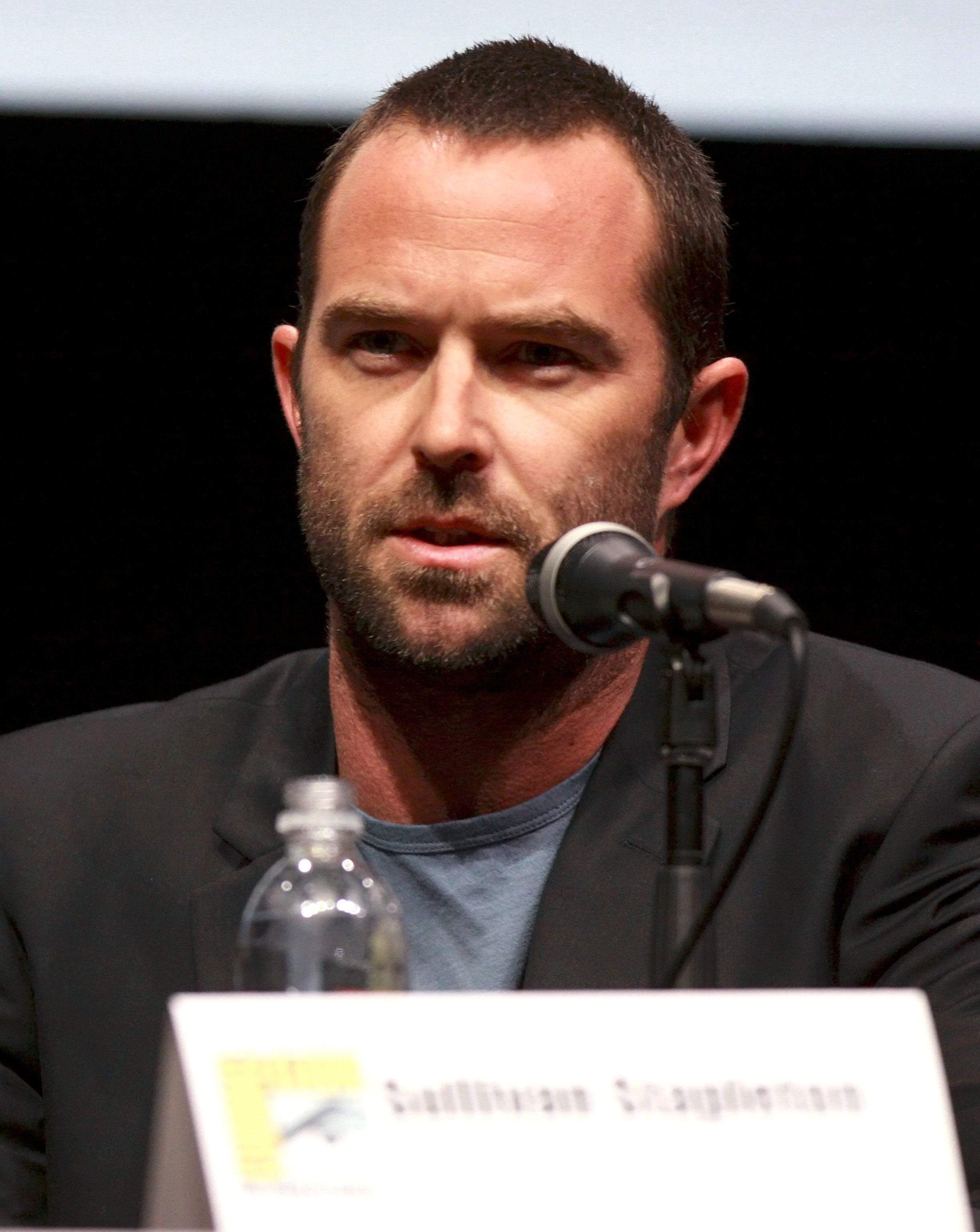
- Stapleton in 2013
- Born: 14 June 1977 (age 49); Melbourne, Victoria, Australia
- Education: Sandringham Secondary College; St. Martins Theatre
- Occupation: Actor
- Years active: 1994–present
- Known for: Kurt Weller in Blindspot

Sullivan Stapleton (born 14 June 1977) is an Australian actor who is best known for his roles in the television series The Secret Life of Us, Strike Back and Blindspot. He also starred in the film Animal Kingdom and played the lead role, Greek leader Themistocles, in the film 300: Rise of an Empire (2014).

== Early life and education ==
Stapleton was born in Melbourne, Victoria. He was eight years old when he and his younger sister, actress Jacinta Stapleton, six at the time, joined an acting and modelling agency. The idea first came to their aunt who signed her own children with the agency. She then asked her nephew and niece if they would like to join and their mother signed them. Stapleton's younger brother Joshua also launched into acting, dance and musical theatre as a child.

Stapleton's picture caught the attention of a director who invited him to be in his short film. Pleased by his performance, the director said he was gifted and encouraged him to pursue acting.

Stapleton received training at Melbourne's St. Martins Theatre. He studied drama and theatre at Sandringham Secondary College (in Sandringham, Victoria, Australia).

== Career ==
Stapleton launched his career in Australia. He got his actors' union card at the age of 9 and at 11 he started working in ads. Stapleton's first onscreen acting performance was in the 1994 Australian TV movie Baby Bath Massacre as Adrian. Between acting jobs, Stapleton performed several types of work: modelling, cleaning animal cages in a pet shop, and working as a grip in many films and TV productions. In 1995, Sullivan appeared in Blue Heelers for one episode, and again in 2003 for 3 episodes. He also worked on The Elephant Princess, Rush, Tangle) in front and behind the camera, working on building sites, and assisting carpenters.

Before landing a role as Josh Hughes in Australian soap opera Neighbours in 1998, Sullivan appeared in a string of little-seen features and homegrown dramas. Other notable roles include Justin Davies in the Australian television series The Secret Life of Us between 2003 and 2005, Fearless in 2007 film December Boys, special agent Wilkins in 2007 American action film The Condemned. But it was with Stapleton's performance in the Academy Award-nominated film Animal Kingdom, which premiered at the 2010 Sundance Film Festival, that he made an international breakthrough.

When Animal Kingdom won the Grand Jury Prize at the Sundance Film Festival interest in him sparked on two continents and his career has taken him across the globe. He made his second appearance in Underbelly, an Australian true crime drama television series, this time as the lead character, Colin McLaren in Underbelly Files: Infiltration. This was an endurance test for Stapleton and the first challenging shoot of his career. Previously he played Pat Barbaro in an episode of Underbelly.

From 2011, off the back of Animal Kingdom, Stapleton began a main role as Damien Scott in Strike Back, a British action thriller series based on the 2007 novel of the same name by novelist and former SAS soldier Chris Ryan. During his tenure on the series, he landed a role in his first American film, 2013's Gangster Squad, with Ryan Gosling, Emma Stone, Sean Penn and Josh Brolin. That same year, he was honoured with a Breakthrough Award at an exclusive Australians in Film Benefit Dinner held in Los Angeles.

In early 2014, while Stapleton was in Thailand for the filming of Strike Back, on a night out in Bangkok after work, he fell off a tuk-tuk and suffered a head injury that left him in a coma. He was resuscitated by former UFC Middleweight Champion Michael Bisping, with whom he had been spending his night out. Shooting for the show was paused for six months to allow his full recovery. Airing of the fifth season was also pushed to 2015. In 2014, Stapleton also starred as the lead character, Greek general Themistocles in American epic historical action film 300: Rise of an Empire, opposite Eva Green, Lena Headey and David Wenham.

For five seasons, from 2015 until its end in 2020, Stapleton starred opposite Jaimie Alexander in American crime series, Blindspot, as FBI agent, Kurt Weller. Between filming the pilot and the ongoing series, Sullivan flew to Berlin to film his role as SEAL team leader Matt Barnes in 2017 action film American Renegades. He next appeared in 2019 biographical sports drama Ride Like a Girl, alongside Teresa Palmer and Rachel Griffiths, in which he played horse trainer Darren Weir.

In 2022, Stapleton had a lead role in After the Verdict, a six-part Australian comedy drama television series on Nine Network, playing the role of Daniel, opposite Lincoln Younes and Magda Szubanski.

== Awards ==
Year	Work	Award	Category	Result	Ref.
2010	Animal Kingdom	Australian Film Institute Award	Best Supporting Actor	Nominated	
2011	Animal Kingdom	Chlotrudis Award	Best Performance by an Ensemble Cast	Nominated	
2013	Sullivan Stapleton	Australians in Film	Breakthrough Award	Honoured	
2015	Cut Snake	AACTA Award	Best Lead Actor	Nominated	
2016	Cut Snake	Australian Film Critics Association Award	Best Actor	Nominated	
2016	Cut Snake	Film Critics Circle of Australia Award	Best Actor	Nominated	
2016	Cut Snake	TLA Gaybie Award	Best Supporting Actor in a Gay Role	Nominated	
2020		AACTA Award	Best Indie Film	Nominated	

== Filmography ==
=== Film ===
Year	Title	Role	Notes
1996	River Street	Chris	
1998	Amy	Wayne Lassiter	
2000	Bored Olives (aka City Loop)	Dom	
2003	Darkness Falls	Officer Matt Henry	
2004	Everything Goes	Jack	Short film
2007	The Condemned	Special Agent Brad Wilkins	
2007	The Bloody Sweet Hit	Carl	Short film
2007	December Boys	Fearless	
2010	Animal Kingdom	Craig Cody	Nominated – AACTA Award for Best Actor in a Supporting Role
2010	Centre Place	James Ballintyne	
2011	The Hunter	Doug	
2013	Gangster Squad	Jack Whalen	
2014	300: Rise of an Empire	Themistocles	
2014	Kill Me Three Times	Nathan Webb	
2014	Cut Snake	Pommie	Nominated – AACTA Award for Best Actor in a Leading Role; Nominated – Australian Film Critics Association Award for Best Actor; Nominated – FCCA Award for Best Actor
2017	Renegades	Matt Barnes	
2019	Ride Like a Girl	Darren Weir	
2020	A Sunburnt Christmas	Dingo	
2026	The Internship	Nelson	
2026	Runner	Josh	

=== Television ===
Year	Title	Role	Notes
1994	Baby Bath Massacre	Adrian	TV movie
1995; 2003	Blue Heelers	Ian Shannon / Gethin Fox / Anthony Hood	3 episodes: "Second Innings"; "Father's Day: Part 1&2"; "Victims"
1997	Good Guys Bad Guys	Paul Morello	Episode: "A Bilby in Rat's Clothing"
1997–1998	State Coroner	'Bullbar' Benson / Darren Pyke	2 episodes: "Sunday in the Country", "Final Approach"
1998	Raw FM	Bucky	Episode: "Raw'n'Sore"
1998	Neighbours	Josh Hughes	Recurring role; 10 episodes
1998	The Genie from Down Under 2	Surfer #2	Episode: "The Cold Shoulder"
1998	Halifax f.p.	Hamish	Episode: "Afraid of the Dark"
1999	Witch Hunt	Craig Thomas	TV movie
1999	Pig's Breakfast		TV series
1999	Stingers	Matt Wilmott	Episode: "Dance with the Dragon"
2000	Something in the Air	Wayne Taylor	4 episodes: "The Best Man", "The Things We Do", "The Big Match", "Return of the Prodigal"
2000	Green Sails	Infante	TV movie
2001	My Brother Jack	Young Joe	TV movie
2002	MDA	Ben Quilty	2 episodes: "Rites of Passage", "One Small Step"
2003–2005	The Secret Life of Us	Justin Davies	Main role; 24 episodes
2005	Little Oberon	Martin	TV movie
2006	McLeod's Daughters	Drew Cornwell	Episode: "Winners & Losers"
2007–2009	Satisfaction	Josh	Recurring role; 13 episodes
2008	Underbelly	Pat Barbaro	Episode: "Suffer the Children"
2008	Canal Road	Jack Logan	3 episodes
2008	Rush	Yuri	Episode 12
2009	Carla Cametti PD	Matt Brodie	Recurring role; 6 episodes
2009	Sea Patrol	Geoff Kershaw	Episode: "Guns"
2010	The Odds	Wade	TV movie
2010	Lowdown	Oliver Barry	Episode: "Bonk Bonk, Who's There?"
2011	Underbelly Files: Infiltration	Colin McLaren	Main role; TV movie
2011–2018	Strike Back	Sgt. Damien Scott	Main role; 42 episodes
2015–2020	Blindspot	Kurt Weller	Main role; 100 episodes
2022	After the Verdict	Daniel	Main role; 6 episodes
