= Little Oberon =

2005 Australian television film

- Written by: Peter Gawler
- Directed by: Kevin Carlin
- Music by: Yuri Worontschak
- Country of origin: Australia
- Original language: English

Production
- Producer: Susan Bower
- Cinematography: Mark Wareham
- Editor: Philip Watts
- Running time: 126 minutes

Original release
- Network: Nine Network
- Release: 18 September 2005

Little Oberon, directed by Kevin Carlin, is an Australian telemovie starring Sigrid Thornton, which was broadcast on 18 September 2005 by Network Nine. The movie was filmed during 2004 in and around the town of Marysville, Victoria. Also appearing in the telemovie were Brittany Byrnes, Tasma Walton and Peter Rowsthorn.

The film is about Georgie Green (Walton) and her daughter Natasha (Byrnes, nominated for an AFI award) going to visit Georgie's mother, Lola (Thornton) who is dying of cancer. Thornton shaved her head for the role; and said that wearing a bald cap would be disrespectful to cancer patients. Natasha tries to find out the identity of her father and begins to have visions of a young friend of her mother who had disappeared 16 years before. With Georgie – a witch (Wicca) – and family tensions high, there are settling-in problems when Georgie and Natasha decide to stay for a while.

== Cast ==
- Sigrid Thornton as Lola Green
- Tasma Walton as Georgie Green
- Brittany Byrnes as Natasha Green
- Alexander Cappelli as Gresham
- Brett Climo as Dr. Vivian Cage
- Helen Dallimore as Siobhan
- Peter Rowsthorn as Miss Kafka
- Morgan O'Neill as Dennis
- Samantha Reynolds as Cathy Burke
- Katrina Milosevic as Fatima
- Tony Nikolakopoulos as Baker
- Syd Brisbane as Butcher
- Sullivan Stapleton as Martin
