= Scorched (2008 film) =

2008 television film

- Written by: Tim Pye
- Directed by: Tony Tilse
- Starring: Georgie Parker; Rachael Carpani; Vince Colosimo; Libby Tanner; Cameron Daddo; Bobby Morley; Alexandra Fowler; Kate Bell; Brittany Byrnes
- Theme music composer: Guy Gross
- Country of origin: Australia
- Original language: English

Production
- Producers: Rosemary Blight; Ellenor Cox; Kylie Du Fresne
- Editor: Geoffrey Lamb
- Running time: 90 minutes

Original release
- Network: Nine Network
- Release: 31 August 2008

Scorched is an Australian television movie broadcast on the Nine Network on 31 August 2008. The telemovie was titled Strike Team, which was ultimately as a decoy due to the state government having been uncomfortable about the premise and plot of the script. Scorched won the International Emmy Award for Digital Program: Fiction in 2009.

== Plot ==
In 2012, Sydney is suffering from a severe water drought. CPN reporter Susan Shapiro launches an investigation into the crisis and interviews the NSW Premier Angela Boardman, who is harboring a secret with Chief of Staff Tom Daily. Meanwhile, ER Doctor Michael Francia suddenly has his estranged daughter from a previous relationship, Emily, spend the night at his house after she argues with her mother.

The next day, Dr. Francia attends to an influx of patients suffering from dehydration and heat exhaustion. Suddenly, a courier truck carrying dozens of gas cylinders crashes in the hospital car park, causing a large flame to erupt. Volunteer firefighters, including David's son Brendan and Brendan's girlfriend, Deanna, are sent to help extinguish the flame. Deanna and two other volunteers are overwhelmed by the blaze and perish during an escape attempt.

Premier Boardman declares a state of emergency and Langmore calls a Section 44, which effectively places him in charge of all emergency workers in the area. Lizzie Francia, Michael's pregnant wife, receives a call from her ill mother. Emily offers to retrieve her from the nursing home, but Lizzie declines. Emily sneaks out of the house and encounters a nearby fire. She tries to run away, but falls down a rocky hill and loses consciousness.

Shapiro accompanies firefighters transporting a man to the hospital. There, she meets with the brother of one of Boardman's rivals, who tells her that Boardman received a large, anonymous donation a month before the election. Francia calls Lizzie to insist that she evacuate, but is injured after the courier truck explodes. Lizzie begins evacuating with her two kids and gets Shapiro to take them in the news helicopter.

Langmore meets with Boardman and insists that they use the water from the desalination plant to extinguish the flames, which Boardman claims to be producing millions of liters of water daily. Boardman refuses his request, instead opting to use saltwater, which will cause permanent environmental damage. Emily is found and saved, to which Dr. Francia reassures her that he loves her.

After the death count reaches over 300, Daily sends Shapiro a text message. He reveals that Boardman made a deal with Argon Energy to give them unlimited fresh water in return for free power to the desalination plant and cash. Shaprio and her cameraman, Teddy, are killed when the factory she is reporting from explodes, releasing toxic gases. Langmore checks his email later that afternoon and finds an email from Shapiro containing her discoveries. Later, Boardman calls a press conference, and Langmore questions her about the deal with Argon. Boardman denies his allegations, to which Langmore sends out copies of the videos to the press.

During the 8 weeks following the crisis, Boardman resigned from Premier and Shapiro has posthumously received the Walkley Award for investigative journalism. However, Sydney has still not received rain.

== Cast ==
- Cameron Daddo as David Langmore (State Operations Commander for the National Fire Service)
- Rachael Carpani as Susan Shapiro (Journalist for CPN News)
- Vince Colosimo as Dr. Michael Francia (Doctor at Baulkham Hills Public Hospital)
- Georgie Parker as Angela Boardman (Premier of New South Wales)
- Libby Tanner as Lizzie Francia (wife of Dr. Michael Francia)
- Bob Morley as Brendan Langmore (son of David Langmore, and volunteer firefighter)
- Alexandra Fowler as Kate Langmore (wife of David Langmore)
- Les Hill as Tom Daily (Chief of Staff to the Premier)
- Brittany Byrnes as Deanna Pearce (girlfriend of Brendan Langmore)
- Anita Hegh as Linda (National Fire Service officer)
- Kathryn Beck as Emily Francia (daughter of Dr. Michael Francia and stepdaughter of Lizzie Francia)
- Ben Oxenbould as Lenny (volunteer firefighter)
- Simon Maiden as Teddy (cameraman for Susan Shapiro)
- Mark McCann as Darren
- Brendan Donoghue as Gabe
- Justin Rosniak as policeman
- Salvatore Coco as Richard (National Fire Service officer)
- Karl Beattie as Ben Francia (son of Dr. Michael & Lizzie Francia)
- Lucia Mundell as Lilli Francia (daughter of Dr. Michael & Lizzie Francia)
- Kate Bell as Cassie Hoffman (local resident)
- Zachary Garred as Jade Hall (boyfriend of Cassie Hoffman)
- Drew Jarvis as Ewen Trembly
- Gary Waddell as Nick
- Kate Box as Annie
- Russell Dykstra as Keith
- Nathan Page as Gavin

== Related media ==
The weeks leading up to the broadcast of the telemovie saw a major online viral marketing campaign, with a number of websites and YouTube accounts created specifically to promote the telemovie by highlighting specific events, organisations and characters featured in the film.

The official website takes the guise of the homepage for CPN (Cross Platform News), a fictional news network from 2012 which is featured in the film. Websites for the fictional New South Wales Premier Angela Boardman, a fictional resident action group RAWT (Residents Against Water Theft), and the fictional companies Argon Energy and the H20 water transport group were also put online.

The official website also allows users to view online prequel and sequel webisodes, and add some of the characters as friends on Facebook.
