= Baby Bath Massacre =

- Directed by: Stuart McDonald
- Written by: Stuart McDonald; Wain Fimeri
- Produced by: Roslyn Walker
- Starring: Maya Stange; Sullivan Stapleton
- Cinematography: Robin Plunkett (DoP)
- Edited by: Mark Atkin
- Music by: Barry Palmer
- Production company: Jonathan M. Shiff Productions
- Release date: 1994
- Running time: 88 mins
- Country: Australia
- Language: English

Baby Bath Massacre is a 1994 Australian teen drama television film directed by Stuart McDonald and starring Maya Stange and Sullivan Stapleton. It was a spin-off from the TV series Raw.

== Synopsis ==
Students not participating in weekly inter-school sport are expected to partake in skating activities at the local rollerskating rink. Rebellious Rose and introverted Adrian meet on the way to the rink and get involved in an event called 'The Baby Bath Massacre', where the proprietor has superglued plastic baby baths to skateboards to use as racing vehicles to push each other around in.

== Cast ==
- Maya Stange as Rose
- Sullivan Stapleton as Adrian
- Alexandra Schepisi as Amber
- Merridy Eastman as Miss Mills

== Production ==
The production was filmed in Melbourne, Australia and featured at the 1995 Melbourne International Film Festival (MIFF). It was funded by the T.A.C., designed to be telecast via satellite systems in place throughout all Victoria State Government schools.
