= Brittany Byrnes =

Australian actress

- Born: Brittany Anne Byrnes; 31 July 1987 (age 38); Australia
- Education: Terra Sancta College; Bradshaw Dancers Performing Arts Academy
- Occupations: Actress, dancer, choreographer
- Years active: 1993–present
- Notable work: Charlotte Watsford in H_{2}O: Just Add Water

Brittany Anne Byrnes (born 31 July 1987) is an Australian actress. Her most notable acting role has been Charlotte Watsford in H_{2}O: Just Add Water.

== Personal life ==
Byrnes was born in Australia and trained in all aspects of dance at the Bradshaw Dancers Performing Arts Academy, from the age of four. She attended Terra Sancta College in Quakers Hill, a suburb of Sydney, during her high-school years.

== Career ==
Byrnes had several guest roles in television series including Heartbreak High in 1994. She landed her first film role at the age of seven, playing the Hoggetts' granddaughter in 1995 feature film Babe. She had a guest role in horror anthology series Twisted Tales in 1996, before playing the young Helene in 1998 period miniseries The Violent Earth, opposite Claudia Karvan, Bill Hunter and Andrew McFarlane. From 1998 to 2000, she took on the role of Thea Hawkins in Search for Treasure Island.

In 2001, Byrnes played the main role of Hannah Schuler in Escape of the Artful Dodger. That same year, she secured the role of Dayna in children's TV movie When Good Ghouls Go Bad. She then went on to appear in several films including Mermaids (2003) and Swimming Upstream (2003), appearing opposite Geoffrey Rush, Judy Davis and Jesse Spencer as Diane Fingleton in the latter. She also featured alongside Sigrid Thornton in 2005 TV movie Little Oberon, which saw her nominated for the Young Actor's Award at the AFI Awards, for her performance.

Byrnes has also appeared in a number of television shows, including fantasy series BeastMaster and medical drama All Saints. From 2007 to 2008, she starred in the second season of children's fantasy drama series H_{2}O: Just Add Water, as new girl, Charlotte Watsford. Her portrayal in H_{2}O: Just Add Water earned her a nomination at the AFI Awards in 2008 – this time for Best Supporting Actress in a Television Drama. That same year, she appeared in the telemovie Scorched, opposite Cameron Daddo and Vince Colosimo.

Byrnes starred as Tina in Toybox, a Seven Network preschool series from the creators of Hi-5.

Byrnes eventually stepped away from acting to focus on her dance career. Since 2005, she has worked as a coach and choreographer, specialising in jazz, lyrical and hip hop. She was head coach and choreographer for Australia's first national Hip Hop team and has trained and choreographed teams for the World Championships in Florida. She has won international medals as a dancer and has also produced dance medalists as a choreographer. Byrnes has also served as an international dance judge in the USA and China.

== Filmography ==
=== Film ===
Year	Title	Role	Notes	Ref
1995	Babe	The Hoggetts' Granddaughter	Feature film	
2001	When Good Ghouls Go Bad	Dayna Stenson	TV movie	
2003	Swimming Upstream	Diane Fingleton	Feature film	
2003	Mermaids	Tess	TV movie	
2005	Little Oberon	Natasha Green	TV movie	
2008	Scorched	Deanna Pearce	TV movie	
2009	Sunset Over Water	Magda	Short film	
2018	When Sally Left Steve	Sally	Short film	

=== Television ===
Year	Title	Role	Notes	Ref
1993; 1996	G.P.	Jessica Travis / Amy Hardy	2 episodes	
1994	Heartbreak High	Rachel Stewart	Season 1, 2 episodes	
1996	Twisted Tales	Jessie Courtney	Episode: "Night of the Monster"	
1998	Children's Hospital	Helen Voyt	Episode: "Future Shock"	
1998	Breakers	Catherine		
1998	The Violent Earth	Young Helene	Miniseries	
1998–2000	Search for Treasure Island	Thea Hawkins	26 episodes	
1998–2008	All Saints	Jacinta Clarke / Vicki Ross / Becky Franklin / Vicki Rees / Emma Quinliven	5 episodes	
1999	BeastMaster	Muraki	Episode: "Riddle of the Nymph"	
2000	Water Rats	Geena Sadler	Season 5, 2 episodes	
2001	Escape of the Artful Dodger	Hannah Schuler	26 episodes	
2002	Don't Blame the Koalas	Actress #3	Episode: "A Star is Born"	
2007–2008	H_{2}O: Just Add Water	Charlotte Watsford	Season 2, 24 episodes	
2010	Toybox	Tina the Dancing Doll	Seasons 1-3	
2011	Carols in the Domain	Tina the Dancing Doll	Christmas special	
2014	We are Darren and Riley	Brittany	Web series, episode: "Brittany's Bonanza"	
2014	Wonderland	Pip Sallinger	Episode: "Saving Face"	

== Awards and nominations ==
Year	Award	Category	Work	Result	Ref
1997	Logie Award	Most Popular New Talent	Twisted Tales (episode #1.9: "Night of the Monster")	Nominated	
2005	Australian Film Institute Award	Young Actor's Award	Little Oberon	Nominated	
2008	Australian Film Institute Award	Best Guest or Supporting Actress in a Television Drama	H_{2}O: Just Add Water (episode #2.25: "Sea Change")	Nominated	
