= Kate Alexa =

Australian singer-songwriter (born 1988)

- Born: Kate Alexa Gudinski; 2 March 1988 (age 38); Melbourne, Victoria, Australia
- Genres: Pop, pop rock, dance-pop
- Occupation: Singer-songwriter
- Instruments: Vocals, piano, guitar
- Years active: 1996–2012
- Labels: Liberation (2004–2012)
- Website: www.katealexa.com

Kate Alexa Gudinski (born 2 March 1988) is an Australian former pop rock singer–songwriter and the daughter of the late Australian music promoter Michael Gudinski, AM. Alexa first hit the spotlight in 2004 when her song "Always There" was featured in the Channel 7 series Home and Away. After supporting the Backstreet Boys on their Australia tour, her third single "All I Hear" shot straight into the ARIA top ten, and stayed inside the top twenty for eight weeks.

== Background ==
Alexa's career began when she was thirteen and wrote her first song, then the following year she started doing demos. "Colors of the Rainbow" was the first song she recorded, stating "It's a really fun song, but I don't think I'm ever going to play it for anyone".

She then went on to sign a record deal with her father's label, Liberation Music, in mid-2004.

== Music career ==
=== Broken & Beautiful (2004–06) ===
In 2004, when Alexa was in year eleven of high school, her debut single "Always There", was selected to be the soundtrack to Channel Seven's Home and Away promos during the 2004 Olympic Games. This provided valuable promotion for Alexa, with many viewers wanting to know more about the song. This was very rewarding for her as the song was very meaningful to her.

In 2005, Alexa was finishing year twelve at Melbourne Girls Grammar School (studying Photography, English, Legal Studies and IT) when she released her second single, "My Day Will Come"; a song about seizing the moment, it was another top-thirty hit. That same year, she graduated from high school knowing the importance of finishing school and deciding music is what she wanted to do forever.

On her eighteenth birthday in 2006 she released her third single, "All I Hear". As she celebrated, she found out she had glandular fever and because of this she was unable to do much promotion for the song. The song peaked at number nine on the Australian ARIA Singles Chart and Alexa states "Having a top Ten hit was just an unbelievable feeling. It meant so much to me that people were promoting the song".

On 4 September 2006, Alexa released her fourth single "Somebody Out There" which was another top-thirty hit for her, and on 23 September 2006 Alexa released her long-awaited debut album Broken & Beautiful and described the album as a reflection of her life and journey over the past few years, and claims that everything on the album is true.

=== Gap between albums (2007–08) ===
In 2007, Alexa wrote and recorded twelve original songs plus the theme song "Ordinary Girl" and two songs from Broken & Beautiful for the soundtrack of the Australian television series H_{2}O: Just Add Water series two, also titled H_{2}O: Just Add Water.

In late 2007, Alexa teamed up with Australian producer Molly Meldrum and American rapper Baby Bash to record a cover version of the Womack & Womack song "Teardrops", which was the first single released from Alexa's second studio album in 2008.

In February and March 2008, Kate supported Cyndi Lauper on her national tour of Australia. Her setlist for the tour confirms three new songs that may appear on her second album, "Nothing Compares", "Cherry Pop", and "Hit by Love".

On 16 April 2008, Broken & Beautiful was released in Japan, with two bonus tracks, "Walk On" and an acoustic version of "Always There". The album did not gather much attention when it was released, and did not chart as a result.

=== Infatuation (2009–present) ===
As of early 2008, Alexa was working on her second studio album titled Infatuation, supposedly set for release in late 2008 but after numerous delays it was confirmed that the record would be released on 17 August 2012. Her official website stated that she had come up with a new sound which she had described as "pop with an edge."

Two singles and videos were released prior to the album in 2011, the title track and "X-Rated". Neither singles nor the album charted in Australia.

In January 2010, Alexa was part of the line-up of the "Wet and Wild" festival in Gold Coast, Queensland.

The video of Infatuation's third single, "I'm Falling", was released on 16 July 2012. The album's fourth single, 'I Deny' was released in December 2012. Again, none of the subsequent singles charted in Australia.

== Personal life ==
Alexa can play the piano and is teaching herself the guitar. She has said that Photography was a hobby of hers while she was in school. She listens to artists such as Alanis Morissette, Oasis, Skyhooks, and Madonna. She has also said that she is interested in fashion, designing shoes such as ballet flats.

In 2019, her father Michael Gudinski revealed in an interview that Alexa is the mother of two children, aged three and one at the time.

== Discography ==
- 2006: Broken & Beautiful
- 2007: H_{2}O: Just Add Water
- 2012: Infatuation
