= Penni Gray =

Australian actress

Penni Gray is an Australian actress. She was a series regular on the third series of H_{2}O: Just Add Water, and has appeared on All Saints, Home and Away, and Terra Nova.

== Filmography ==
=== Film ===
Year	Title	Role	Notes
1994	Baldness: A Human Tragedy – The Nathan Beetle Story		Short film
2003	Mesmerised	Courtney	Short film

=== Television ===
Year	Title	Role	Notes
1994	Time Trax	Checker	Episode: "Split Image"
1999	Heartbreak High	Lyn	
2004, 2006	All Saints	Pam Holman / Margaret Walters	
2004, 2007, 2012	Home and Away	Ms. Simmons / Faith Lopez / Dr. Rosi Bennett	
2005	The Surgeon	Katrina	
2009–10	H_{2}O: Just Add Water	Samantha Roberts	
2010	Wicked Love: The Maria Korp Story	Becky	
2011	Terra Nova	Female Operative	2 episodes
	Pacific Drive	Policewoman	
	Paradise Beach	Kim Carlson	

=== Stage ===
Year	Title	Role	Location	Notes
1993	The Removalists	Fiona	Brisbane Arts Theatre	
