= Jonathan M. Shiff =

Australian television producer

- Born: Jonathan Mark Shiff; Queensland, Australia
- Education: Swinburne University of Technology
- Occupation: Television producer
- Years active: 1988–present
- Known for: Jonathan M. Shiff Productions
- Website: www.jmsp.com.au/jmsp/public/public

Jonathan Mark Shiff is an Australian television producer of television series. After leaving his work as a lawyer, he founded his own Melbourne-based production company, Jonathan M. Shiff Productions, in 1988. His company produces programs for children and families, which are screened in 170 countries. He is regarded in the industry as being known for discovering Australian talent who go on to successful international careers, such as Margot Robbie, Liam Hemsworth, Claire Holt, and Phoebe Tonkin.

== Notable projects ==
Shiff is best known for producing the Ocean Girl series, the H_{2}O: Just Add Water series and spinoff Mako Mermaids, which stream on Netflix. Shiff also produced the television series The Bureau of Magical Things.

== Upcoming projects ==
While his professional homepage hints that a movie of 90 minutes length has been produced for Mako Mermaids, the B2B-site that ZDF Enterprises — distributor of the H_{2}O franchise — operates for said show, shows no sign of such movie produced.

Shiff also hinted the movie on social media.

== Filmography ==
=== Television ===
Title	Year	Credited as			Network	Production company	Notes
Title	Year	Creator	Producer	Executive producer	Network	Production company	Notes
The Pandas: Fei Fei and Xiao Xiao China's Living Treasures	1988		Yes	No		Westbridge Films	Documentary
Search for the World's Most Secret Animals	1989		No	Yes		Westbridge Films	Documentary
Kelly	1991–92	No	No	Yes	Network 10	Westbridge Entertainment	
Baby Bath Massacre	1994		Yes	No		Jonathan M. Shiff Productions	Television film
Ocean Girl	1994–97	Yes	Yes	Yes	Network 10	Jonathan M. Shiff Productions	
Thunderstone	1999–2000	Yes	Yes	Yes	Network 10	Jonathan M. Shiff Productions	Executive producer (season 3)
The New Adventures of Ocean Girl	2000	No	No	Yes	Network 10	Media World Features	
Horace and Tina	2001	Yes	Yes	Yes	Network 10	Jonathan M. Shiff Productions	
Cybergirl	2001–02	Yes	Yes	Yes	Network 10	Jonathan M. Shiff Productions & Daniel Scharf Productions	
Pirate Islands	2003	Concept	Yes	Yes	Network 10	Jonathan M. Shiff Productions	
Wicked Science	2004–06	Concept	Yes	Yes	Network 10	Jonathan M. Shiff Productions	
Scooter: Secret Agent	2005	Concept	Yes	Yes	Network 10	Jonathan M. Shiff Productions	
H_{2}O: Just Add Water	2006–10	Yes	Yes	Yes	Network 10	Jonathan M. Shiff Productions	
The Lost Treasure of Fiji	2007	Yes	No	Yes	Network 10	Banana J Media	
The Elephant Princess	2008–11	Yes	Yes	Yes	Network 10	Jonathan M. Shiff Productions	
Lightning Point	2012	No	Yes	Yes	Network 10	Jonathan M. Shiff Productions	
Reef Doctors	2013	No	Yes	Yes	Network 10	Jonathan M. Shiff Productions	
Mako: Island of Secrets	2013–16	Developer	Yes	Yes	Network 10	Jonathan M. Shiff Productions	
The Bureau of Magical Things	2018–21	Yes	Yes	Yes	Eleven; 10 Shake	Jonathan M. Shiff Productions	
