= Broken & Beautiful (Kate Alexa album) =

Studio album by Kate Alexa
- Released: 25 September 2006
- Recorded: 2004–2006
- Genres: Pop, pop rock, teen pop, adult contemporary
- Length: 50:40
- Label: Liberation
- Producers: Stuart Brawley, Pete Dacy, Charles Fisher, Jim Marr, Wendy Page, Reed Vertelney

Kate Alexa chronology
Broken & Beautiful (2006)	H2O: Just Add Water (2007)

Alternative cover
- The cover of the Japan edition.

Singles from Broken & Beautiful
- 1. "Always There" Released: 27 September 2004; 2. "My Day Will Come" Released: 12 September 2005; 3. "All I Hear" Released: 6 March 2006; 4. "Somebody Out There" Released: 4 September 2006; 5. "Better than You" Released: November 2006

Broken & Beautiful is the debut studio album by Australian singer Kate Alexa, released in Australia on 25 September 2006 by Liberation Music. The album has a main genre of pop rock songs, all of which besides the title track "Broken & Beautiful" were co-written by Alexa herself. She states she chose the title Broken & Beautiful because "We all make mistakes, and we all have flaws. We're delicate and we're vulnerable. But we're still beautiful on the inside." "The album definitely my life and journey over the past few years. It's my story and it's all true" she states. The album yielded five singles: "Always There", "My Day Will Come", "All I Hear", "Somebody Out There" and "Better than You".

== Album information ==
Two years were spent recording the album, from 2004 to 2006, while Alexa was still at school, working with producers such as Charles Fisher and Pete Dacy and songwriters like Jim Marr and Wendy Page, Charlie Midnight and Matthew Gerrard. Regarding the making of the album Alexa said "I was juggling school and writing and songwriting trips for a while. I'm a bit of a perfectionist and I didn't want to release anything until I loved it. So it took a while.", also saying "When I write a song, I'm not just sitting down and saying 'OK, I'm going to write a song now', it's all about what I'm feeling at the time"

She co-wrote every single of the album's tracks besides the title track, which was suggested for her to record by John Kalodner after having heard some of her songs while she was in LA recording the album.

Alexa helped with promoting the album by touring with artists such as the Backstreet Boys and Jesse McCartney in early 2006, and also traveling to many schools around the country leading up to the album's release. In April 2008, Broken & Beautiful was released in Japan through Mia Records and featured a new track called "Walk On" and an acoustic version of "Always There".

== Critical reception ==
Professional ratings
Review scores
Source	Rating
Kenneth Nguyen, The Age	(not rated) link
Smash Hits	3.5/5 stars

The critical reception of the album consisted of mixed reviews, a negative one by Kenneth Nguyen from The Age, stating the album "comes across as a little too old-fashioned, a little too polite, a little – may I say it? – too Hilary Duff."

== Chart performance and singles ==
On 1 October 2006, the album entered the Australian ARIA Albums Chart at number sixty-four. The following week it peaked at number seventy-two then number ninety, only spending three weeks on the chart. It also peaked at number eighteen on the Australian Artists Chart and number-one on the Hitseekers Albums Chart.

=== Singles ===
- The first single from the album and Alexa's debut single was "Always There" which was released in September 2004, it debuted at number twenty-one on the ARIA Singles Chart and peaked at number sixteen, making this her first top twenty hit. This was largely helped by the song appearing on two episodes of Home and Away.
- "My Day Will Come" was the second single released in September 2005, and peaked at number twenty-four, and was the album's weakest single in terms of peak position and chart run, only staying on the ARIA top fifty for four weeks.
- The album's third single "All I Hear" was and is still Alexa's most successful single to date, peaking at number nine on the ARIA Singles Chart in March 2006, stayed on the top fifty for ten weeks and became the 100th best selling single of 2006, as well as the eighty-third best-selling physical single and the twenty-fourth best selling single by an Australian artist.
- The fourth and lead single from the album was "Somebody Out There" which debuted at number thirty-three in September 2006 and rose to number twenty-one in its fourth week of charting, and stayed on the ARIA top fifty for five weeks.
- "Better than You" was released to Australian radio in November 2006 and received a fair amount of airplay, but did not chart on the ARIA Singles Chart due to its only being released to radio.

== Track listing ==
No.	Title	Writer(s)	Producer(s)	Length
1.	"Somebody Out There"	Kate Gudinski, Jim Marr, Wendy Page	Jim Marr, Wendy Page	3:07
2.	"All I Hear"	Kate Gudinski, A. JayBee, Reed Vertelney, Lindy Robbins	Reed Vertelney	3:27
3.	"I Let Go"	Kate Gudinski, Jim Marr, Wendy Page	Jim Marr, Wendy Page	3:58
4.	"We All Fall Down"	Kate Gudinski, A. JayBee, Reed Vertelney, Lindy Robbins	Reed Vertelney	4:09
5.	"Naked Heart"	Kate Gudinski, A. JayBee, Charlie Midnight, Charlton Pettus	Pete Dacy	2:48
6.	"My Day Will Come"	Kate Gudinski, Jim Marr, Wendy Page	Charles Fisher	3:40
7.	"Glass Slipper"	Kate Gudinski, A. JayBee, Stuart Brawley, Michelle Lewis	Stuart Brawley	3:31
8.	"Under the Influence of You"	Kate Gudinski, A. JayBee, Reed Vertelney, Lindy Robbins	Reed Vertelney	3:52
9.	"Better than You"	Kate Gudinski, A. JayBee, Stuart Brawley, Michelle Lewis	Stuart Brawley	3:35
10.	"In Your Eyes"	Kate Gudinski, A. JayBee, Jim Marr, Wendy Page	Jim Marr, Wendy Page	3:54
11.	"Broken & Beautiful"	A. JayBee, Johan Aberg, Sigurd Rosnes, Michelle Lewis	Charles Fisher	3:41
12.	"Not Another Love Song"	Kate Gudinski, A. JayBee, Matthew Gerrard, Robbie Nevil	Matthew Gerrard	3:39
13.	"Always There"	A. JayBee, Kate Gudinski, Dragan Stanic, Brendan Fitzgerald	Charles Fisher	3:47
14.	"I Tried It Anyway"	Dragan Stanic, Brendan Fitzgerald	Pete Dacy	3:24

Japanese Edition
No.	Title	Length
1.	"Somebody Out There"	3:07
2.	"All I Hear"	3:27
3.	"Better than You"	3:35
4.	"Naked Heart"	2:48
5.	"Glass Slipper"	3:31
6.	"My Day Will Come"	3:40
7.	"Under the Influence of You"	3:52
8.	"I Let Go"	3:58
9.	"We All Fall Down"	4:09
10.	"Not Another Love Song"	3:39
11.	"Always There"	3:47
12.	"Broken & Beautiful"	3:41
13.	"In Your Eyes"	3:54
14.	"I Tried It Anyway"	3:24
15.	"Walk On"	3:17
16.	"Always There (Acoustic Version)"	3:38

== Chart position ==
Chart (2006)	Peak position
Australian Albums (ARIA Charts)	64

== Release history ==
Region	Date	Label	Format	Catalogue
Australia	25 September 2006	Liberation Music	CD	LIBCD82162
Japan	16 April 2008	Spinning Inc., VillageAgain	CD	TSF-016
