= Always There (Kate Alexa song) =

Single by Kate Alexa

from the album Broken & Beautiful
- B-side: "Turn It Up"
- Released: 2004
- Recorded: 2004
- Genre: Pop
- Length: 3:47
- Label: Mushroom Records, Liberation
- Songwriter(s): Kate Alexa, Dragan Stanic, Brendan Fitzgerald
- Producer(s): Charles Fisher

Kate Alexa singles chronology
"Always There" (2004)	"My Day Will Come" (2005)

"Always There" was the first single from Kate Alexa, released in September 2004, when she was sixteen years old. This song is from her debut album, Broken & Beautiful, which was released two years after.

== History ==
It was selected to be the soundtrack to the Seven Network soap Home and Away's promos during the 2004 Olympics, and was also used on two episodes of Home and Away. It provided valuable promotion for Alexa. "It didn't feel real at first" she said, "I thought my CD player was on! Then it hit me. Everyone watching TV at the time was hearing my song. It was very rewarding because the song meant so much to me."

== Theme ==
The song was about the death of a friend. Alexa said "Writing this song was a way of trying to come to terms with the sudden death of a friend. It was such a sad time, but it inspired me to write what I was going through. It's a very precious song. It helped me cope, and it means a lot to me when I hear that the song has also helped other people."

== Track listing ==
1. "Always There" – 3:47
2. "Turn It Up" – 2:59

== Chart performance ==
"Always There" debuted at No. 21 on the Australian ARIA Singles Chart, peaked at No. 16, and stayed in the top 50 for eight weeks.

=== Charts ===
Chart (2004)	Peak position
Australia (ARIA)	16
