= All I Hear =

Single by Kate Alexa

from the album Broken & Beautiful
- Released: March 6, 2006
- Recorded: 2005
- Genre: Pop, rock
- Length: 3:30
- Label: Mushroom Records, Liberation
- Songwriters: Kate Alexa, Reed Vertelney, Lindy Robbins
- Producer: Reed Verntley

Kate Alexa singles chronology
| "My Day Will Come" (2005) | "All I Hear" (2006) | "Somebody Out There" (2006) |

"All I Hear" was the third single from Kate Alexa, released in March 2006, taken from her debut album, Broken & Beautiful. There are two different versions of the single, one of them is the original and the other is the enhanced limited edition which has two extra tracks. The song is included on the compilation Now Winter 2006.

== Recording and theme ==
Despite its chart success, not a lot of promotion could be done for the single due to Alexa suffering from glandular fever. "It was the worst birthday present ever" she said, "it was hell"."

According to Alexa, the song is about "...a person and no matter what they say they drive you insane". She states that's she started writing the song "by singing the melody "La, la, la, la, la..." and we all decided, "That's pretty much what the song is about" so we kept it".

== Music video ==
Like that of her last single, My Day Will Come, the video was directed by Bart Borghesi and was shot in Melbourne. It shows Kate walking around on a sunny day walking across a bridge past two men in suits, one of them knocks her shoulder and his briefcase drops, the two men then begin to argue. It then switches to Kate performing with her band in a park with a crowd. Then it goes to Kate going into what seems to be a hotel room which belongs to the guy of the song, dropping all the clothes on the rail off the hangers and destroying sunglasses and writing the words "knock knock knock" on the door. For the second chorus she is performing with her band again. At the bridge she is seen putting super glue in the guy's hair gel. It keeps flipping from Kate performing with the band to Kate in the hotel room, dropping a phone in a goldfish bowl and graffiti-ing the wall. It ends with Kate jumping up and down on the bed of the room after ripping up the cushions and throwing the CD single copy of "All I Hear" on the bed.

== Chart performance ==
This is her most successful single to date, peaking at #9 on the ARIA Singles Chart and stayed in the Top 50 for ten weeks, and was the 100th best selling single of 2006 in Australia.

=== Weekly charts ===
| Chart (2006) | Peak position |
|---|---|
| Australia (ARIA) | 9 |

=== Year-end charts ===
| Chart (2006) | Position |
|---|---|
| Australia (ARIA) | 100 |

== Track listings ==
CD Single: Original Single Track Listing

1. "All I Hear"

CD Single: Enhanced Limited Edition Track Listing

1. "All I Hear"
2. "My Day Will Come" (Remix)
3. On Tour With Jesse McCartney (Computer Video)

== Uses ==
All I Hear was used in an episode of the second series of The Sleepover Club, and also in an episode of the second series of Blue Water High, where Perri (Tahyna Tozzi) performs it.
