= My Day Will Come =

Single by Kate Alexa

from the album Broken & Beautiful
- B-side: "Walk On"
- Released: September 12, 2005
- Recorded: 2005
- Genre: Pop, Rock
- Length: 3:50
- Label: Mushroom Records, Liberation
- Songwriter(s): Kate Alexa, Jim Marr, Wendy Page
- Producer(s): Charles Fisher

Kate Alexa singles chronology
"Always There" (2004)	"My Day Will Come" (2005)	"All I Hear" (2006)

"My Day Will Come" is the second single from Kate Alexa, released in September 2005. This single is from her debut album, Broken & Beautiful. It comprised two singles, one was the one without the digital video film clip which was the original one and the other one with the digital video film clip which was the enhanced limited edition. Both singles also include a new song called "Walk On" and the acoustic version of "Always There", her debut single.

== History and theme ==
This was Alexa's second single, released almost a year (50 weeks) after her debut, "Always There". The album, Broken & Beautiful, was released two more singles later and a year afterwards.

Alexa says the song is about "believing in yourself" and "...no matter how hard things get, don't give up. Your day will come."

== Music video ==
The music video for the song was directed by Bart Borghesi, and shows Alexa in an old house. In the beginning she is sat to a table singing the first verse, and she walks up to the band members with sheets over them, which she pulls off, and then starts performing the first chorus with them. Throughout the video she keeps catching sight of a mysterious man, and shots of her sat on the stairs performing with the band.

== Chart performance ==
It did not do as well on the charts as Always There, it peaked at #24 and stayed on the ARIA top 50 for only 4 weeks.

Chart (2006)	Peak position
Australian ARIA Singles Chart	24

== Track listings ==
CD Single: Original single track listing

1. "My Day Will Come"
2. "Walk On"
3. "Always There" (Acoustic Version)

CD Single: Enhanced Limited Edition single track listing

1. "My Day Will Come"
2. "Walk On"
3. "Always There" (Acoustic Version)
4. "My Day Will Come" (Video)
