= H2O: Just Add Water =

Australian children's television show

H_{2}O: Just Add Water
- Also known as: H_{2}O
- Genre: Teen drama; Fantasy
- Created by: Jonathan M. Shiff
- Directed by: Colin Budds; Jeffrey Walker
- Starring: Cariba Heine; Claire Holt; Phoebe Tonkin; Angus McLaren; Indiana Evans; Luke Mitchell
- Theme music composer: Shelley Rosenberg
- Opening theme: "No Ordinary Girl": Ellie Henderson (series 1); Kate Alexa (series 2); Indiana Evans (series 3)
- Ending theme: "No Ordinary Girl"
- Composers: Ricky Edwards; Ric Formosa
- Country of origin: Australia
- Original language: English
- No. of series: 3
- No. of episodes: 78 (list of episodes)

Production
- Executive producers: Jonathan M. Shiff; Kay Ben M'Rad (series 1); Julia Adams (series 2–3)
- Producers: Jonathan M. Shiff; Joanna Werner
- Cinematography: Bruce Phillips (series 1); Zenon Sawko (series 2–3)
- Editors: Geoff Lamb; Strutts Psyridis; Philip Watts
- Camera setup: Single-camera
- Running time: 23–25 minutes
- Production companies: Jonathan M. Shiff Productions; ZDF Enterprises

Original release
- Network: Network 10
- Release: 7 July 2006 – 16 April 2010

Related
- Mako: Island of Secrets; H_{2}O: Mermaid Adventures

H_{2}O: Just Add Water, more commonly referred to as H_{2}O, is an Australian fantasy children and teen drama television show created by Jonathan M. Shiff. It first screened on Australia's Network Ten and as of 2009 ran in syndication in over 120 countries with a worldwide audience of more than 250 million. It was filmed on location at Sea World and other locations on the Gold Coast, Queensland, Australia. The show revolves around three teenage girls facing everyday teen problems while keeping the fact they are mermaids a secret. Each has their own unique, supernatural power related to water.

Only two series with a total of 52 episodes were originally planned, but due to popular demand, a third series was filmed. Series 1 premiered in July 2006, followed by series 2 in September 2007. Series 3 first aired in the United Kingdom in October 2009, with the Australian premiere occurring in May 2010. German Public-service television company ZDF is the co-producer behind the series and distributes it globally.

== Plot ==
Rikki Chadwick, Emma Gilbert, and Cleo Sertori, three teenage Australian girls, find themselves stranded on the mysterious Mako Island, where they end up in a pool under a dormant volcano just as a full moon passes above them, bathing the pool in light. The girls are rescued and brought back to shore, only to discover something strange. Ten seconds after coming into contact with water, the girls transform into mermaids. After further experimentation, the girls also discover they have supernatural powers over water. The trio enlist the help of Cleo's friend Lewis McCartney to help them keep their secret and find out more about it.

Everyday situations, such as bathing and dealing with rainy weather, become challenges the girls must navigate as they struggle with their newfound abilities, while also trying to keep their abilities secret from others in their lives. They soon adapt to their new abilities and lifestyles.

Series two introduces Charlotte Watsford, a rival to Cleo, who dates Lewis after Cleo breaks up with him. She gains mermaid powers and becomes the main antagonist of series two. She has all three of the mermaids' powers. In the end, Charlotte loses both her powers and Lewis, who gets back together with Cleo.

Series three sees the departure of Emma, who has left to travel the world with her family. A new character, Bella Hartley, is introduced and it is discovered that she has been a mermaid since the age of nine. Rikki and Cleo become friends with Bella, but are soon beset by a mysterious tentacle of water with a connection to Mako Island. A new boy, Will Benjamin, also arrives and becomes friends with the trio when he discovers that they are mermaids. The girls learn that Earth is in the path of a comet that could destroy the planet. They try to think of a plan to stop the catastrophe.

== Cast ==
=== Main ===
- Cariba Heine as Rikki, the new girl in town at the start of the show, who tends to be aloof and rebellious. Her power is the ability to control heat in water, ranging from warming to boiling, which eventually grows to allow her to control fire and lightning. Heine appears in all series of the show, and makes a special guest appearance in the spin-off series Mako: Island of Secrets.
- Claire Holt as Emma (series 1–2), who has a confident and responsible, if somewhat controlling, personality. She has the ability to freeze water, and later develops the ability to control clouds, ice and snow. Holt appears in series one and two, but left the show at the end of series two to film Messengers 2: The Scarecrow, with the character's departure explained as travelling the world with her family.
- Phoebe Tonkin as Cleo, who at first is shy and a little awkward and does not like water, but eventually becomes outgoing and personable. She is able to control and mould the form of water, as well as increase or decrease the amount of water present. She is later able to control the wind. Tonkin appears in all series of the show.
- Angus McLaren as Lewis, Cleo's childhood friend and later boyfriend who is academically gifted and thinks of himself as a scientist. He helps the girls keep their secret and works to understand how and why the girls transformed into mermaids. After appearing in both series one and two, McLaren left the show during the third series, departing after episode 13, to begin filming Packed to the Rafters, but returned to guest star in the final episode of the show.
- Indiana Evans as Bella (series 3), the new girl in series three. She is a singer and performs at Rikki's café. Bella became a mermaid in the sea caves of Ireland when she was nine, and has the power to change water into gelatine and a crystalline substance. During the series, she and Will develop feelings for each other, and eventually become a couple.
- Luke Mitchell as Will (series 3), a skilled swimmer and free-diver who is introduced in series three. While exploring Mako Island, he finds the moon pool and is attacked by the water, causing him to search for the cause of the strange event. He is Bella's love interest and becomes closer to the girls once he discovers they are mermaids.

=== Supporting ===
- Burgess Abernethy as Zane, who is the arrogant local rich boy. In series one, he becomes obsessed with discovering the identity of the mermaids after catching a glimpse of Emma rescuing him underwater. He later develops an on-again, off-again relationship with Rikki. At the end of series one, when he finds out she, Emma and Cleo are mermaids, he stops his obsessive behaviour to protect Rikki. In series three, he transforms the Juice Net café and goes into a business partnership with Rikki, naming the café after her.
- Cleo Massey as Kim, Cleo's younger sister. She is a typical annoying little sister character, and provokes Cleo through teasing, which is often met with magical repercussions.
- Alan David Lee as Don Sertori, Cleo and Kim's father. He usually has a kindly jolly personality, but is usually hostile to teenage boys who try to date his daughters, although he has warmed up to Lewis since they bonded over a mutual love for fishing.
- Deborah Coulls as Bev (series 1), Cleo and Kim's mother and Don's wife and then later ex-wife. They divorced prior to the events of series 2.
- Christopher Poree as Byron (series 1), local surfer boy, Emma's first boyfriend and nemesis of Zane.
- Annabelle Stephenson as Miriam (series 1), Rikki's rival and Zane's ex-girlfriend. She was bullying the mermaids especially Rikki.
- Trent Sullivan as Elliot (series 1–2), Emma's younger brother.
- Jamie Timony as Nate, one of Zane's friends.
- Brittany Byrnes as Charlotte (series 2), the new girl who becomes the main antagonist of series two. She enjoys the arts and sciences, but can be controlling and manipulative. She comes into conflict with the girls, especially Cleo, when she begins to date Lewis subsequent to his break-up with Cleo. Upon transforming into a mermaid, she obtains all of the girls' collective powers - clarified as being due to the fact that she was exposed to the transformation conditions on her own rather than the original three being present at the same time. She is careless with the mermaid secret and exhibits behavior that the other girls are concerned about, including public displays of her powers. She permanently loses her abilities after a confrontation with the trio. She does not return in series three.
- Craig Horner as Ash (series 2), a keen equestrian and riding coach who appears during series two. He forms a relationship with Emma, but does not learn of her being a mermaid until the season finale, when Emma reveals her identity. Horner does not appear in series three due to filming Legend of the Seeker.
- Penni Gray as Sam Sertori (née Roberts) (series 3), Don's second wife and Cleo and Kim's stepmother who works for the National Park association. In "Valentine's Day", she inspects one of Don's boats, but is drawn into an argument between Kim and Cleo when she is knocked overboard of that boat. Eventually, she and Don start getting romantically closer, which Cleo approves but Kim does not. They get married in "To Have & To Hold Back". She is a seasoned traveler, and brings her many artifacts from her trips into the Setori house, which Kim loudly disapproves of.
- Taryn Marler as Sophie (series 3), an ambitious and driven character who becomes the main antagonist of series three. She is Will's older sister and takes an immediate dislike to Bella because Sophie sees her as a threat to Will's success as a free diver. She becomes a manager in Rikki's café and does as much as possible to cause grief for the mermaids, including destroying Zane and Rikki's relationship. She also tries to get her brother Will to go against Bella by saying she is a distraction. Marler previously appeared as Julia in flashback scenes.

== Production ==
Casting for the series was announced in May 2005 and began on 6 August of that year, at a time when the Gold Coast was already attracting filming for several feature films and blockbusters. The casting session at Warner Bros. Movie World attracted close to 1000 teenage girls.

Regarding the choice of the Gold Coast as a filming location, associated producer Joanna Werner extoled the natural landscape of the area and the available soundscapes and that a show about mermaids wouldn't work if it were produced in Melbourne. Around AU$10 million were spent in its production in 2005-2006 for an initial season of 26 half-hours. In early September, the three lead actresses were selected: Claire Holt (of Brisbane), Phoebe Tonkin (of Sydney) and Cariba Heine (of Canberra). Training for their swimming skills for their mermaid tails was set to start in October, where they would work for five days a week. In March 2006, the series received an order for a second season. Ten started airing the series in July 2006 on a 4pm slot on Fridays.

== Episodes ==
Series	Episodes	Originally released	
Series	Episodes	First released	Last released
1	26	7 July 2006	29 December 2006
2	26	28 September 2007	21 March 2008
3	26	26 October 2009	16 April 2010

== Multimedia ==
=== Home media ===
All series have been released on DVD in Region 4 PAL format. Series one comprises six individual DVD sets released between September 2007 and November 2008, and a complete series set released in June 2009. Series two comprises three individual sets released between February and September 2009, and a complete series set released in November 2009. Series three comprises two individual sets released in July and September 2012, with a complete series released in December 2012.

A three-disc set, H_{2}O: Season 1, Volume 1, containing the first 13 episodes of series 1 for Region 1 NTSC format was released on 16 June 2009 by Nickelodeon and Paramount Home Entertainment as a manufacture-on-demand (MOD) DVD-R release via Amazon.com through their CreateSpace service. No follow-up DVD volume releases were made from this initial set, which was later discontinued. A complete series DVD boxed set was released in Region 1 NTSC format on 6 November 2012 from New Video, and all three series were made available for purchase individually beginning on 5 March 2013.

Title	Release date	Episodes
H_{2}O: Just Add Water: Series One: Volume 1	12 September 2007	1."Metamorphosis", 2."Pool Party", 3."Catch of the Day", 4."Party Girls": Special features: series one trailer, profiles of main characters
H_{2}O: Just Add Water: Series One: Volume 2	12 September 2007	5."Something Fishy", 6."Young Love", 7."Moon Spell", 8."The Denman Affair": Special features: photo gallery of series one
H_{2}O: Just Add Water: Series One: Volume 3	5 March 2008	9."Dangerous Waters", 10."Sink or Swim", 11."The Camera Never Lies", 12."The Siren Effect": Special features: character profiles of Emma, Cleo, Rikki, Lewis and Zane
H_{2}O: Just Add Water: Series One: Volume 4	7 May 2008	13."Shipwrecked", 14."Surprise!", 15."The Big Chill", 16."Lovesick": Special features: H_{2}O quiz game
H_{2}O: Just Add Water: Series One: Volume 5	9 July 2008	17."Under the Weather", 18."Bad Moon Rising", 19."Hurricane Angela", 20."Hook, Line and Sinker", 21."Red Herring"
H_{2}O: Just Add Water: Series One: Volume 6	5 November 2008	22."Fish Out of Water", 23."In Too Deep", 24."Love Potion #9", 25."Dr Danger", 26."A Twist in the Tail"
H_{2}O: Just Add Water: Complete Series One	2 June 2009	All episodes of series one: Special features: H_{2}O quiz game, character profiles of Emma, Cleo, Rikki, Lewis and Zane, photo gallery of series one, series one trailer, profiles of main characters
H_{2}O: Just Add Water: Series 2: Volume 1	27 January 2009	1."Stormy Weather", 2."Control", 3."The One That Got Away", 4."Fire and Ice", 5."Hocus Pocus", 6."Pressure Cooker", 7."In Hot Water", 8."Wrong Side of the Tracks": Special features: series one telemovie, series two trailer
H_{2}O: Just Add Water: Series 2: Volume 2	2 June 2009	9."Riding For a Fall", 10."Missed the Boat", 11."In Over Our Heads", 12."Fish Fever", 13."Moonwalker", 14."Get Off My Tail", 15."Irresistible", 16."Double Trouble", 17."Moonstruck": Special features: photo gallery of series two
H_{2}O: Just Add Water: Series 2: Volume 3	2 September 2009	18."The Heat is On", 19."The Gracie Code (Part 1)", 20."The Gracie Code (Part 2)", 21."And Then There Were Four", 22."Bubble, Bubble, Toil and Trouble", 23."Reckless", 24."Three's Company", 25."Sea Change", 26."Unfathomable": Special features: behind the scenes special
H_{2}O: Just Add Water: Complete Series Two	4 November 2009	All episodes of series two: Special features: series one telemovie, series two trailer, photo gallery of series two, behind-the-scenes special
H_{2}O: Just Add Water: Series 3: Volume 1	27 June 2012	1."The Awakening", 2."Jungle Hunt", 3."Keep Your Enemies Close", 4."Valentine's Day", 5."Big Ideas", 6."Secrets & Lies", 7."Happy Families", 8."Kidnapped", 9."The Sorcerer's Apprentice", 10."Revealed", 11."Just a Girl At Heart", 12."Crime & Punishment", 13."To Have & To Hold Back": Special Features:Photo Gallery & Character Profiles
H_{2}O: Just Add Water: Series 3: Volume 2	5 September 2012	14."Mermaid Magic" 15."Power Play", 16."The Dark Side", 17."A Magnetic Attraction", 18."Into The Light", 19."Breakaway", 20."Queen For A Day", 21."The Jewel Thief", 22."Mako Masters", 23."Beach Party", 24."Too Close For Comfort", 25."A Date With Destiny", 26."Graduation": Special features: behind the scenes special
H_{2}O: Just Add Water: Complete Series Three	3 December 2012	All episodes of series three: Special features: behind the scenes special
H_{2}O: Just Add Water: Complete Series	3 December 2012	All three series in one box: Special features: bonus features known from previous releases

=== Soundtracks ===
An official soundtrack for series two of the show, titled H2O: Just Add Water and recorded by singer Kate Alexa, was first released on 10 September 2007 in Australia on Liberation Records. It has since been made available worldwide. Its lead track, "No Ordinary Girl", is the theme song for the show. "No Ordinary Girl" is performed by Ellie Henderson in series one, by Kate Alexa in series two and by Indiana Evans in series three.

A second soundtrack, featuring music from series three, was first released on iTunes on 17 February 2011, and later worldwide in March 2011. It is also titled H2O: Just Add Water, and most tracks on the album were recorded by actress Indiana Evans.

=== Books ===
Several children's books have been released by Nickelodeon UK:

1. No Ordinary Girl – 2 February 2009
2. Living with Secrets – 2 February 2009
3. Fishy Business – 5 May 2009
4. A Sleepover Tail – 6 July 2009
5. Sequins for Sea Queens – 7 January 2010
6. First Crush – 29 April 2010
7. Moonspell – 5 August 2010
8. Testing Times – 6 January 2011
9. Hot Stuff – 9 June 2011
10. In Too Deep – 4 August 2011
11. Mermaid Emotions – 27 October 2011
12. Siren Status – 2 February 2012

== Reception ==
H_{2}O: Just Add Water received positive reviews from critics and audiences. Emily Ashby of Common Sense Media gave the show four stars out of five, saying that it was about "Aussie mermaids send positive messages to tweens."

=== Awards and nominations ===
Year	Award	Category	Nominee	Result
2007	Nickelodeon Australian Kids' Choice Awards	Best TV Show	H_{2}O: Just Add Water	Nominated
2007	Logie Awards	Most Outstanding Children's Program	H_{2}O: Just Add Water	Nominated
2008	AFI Awards	Best Visual Effects	H_{2}O: Just Add Water	Won
2008	AFI Awards	Best Children's Television Drama	H_{2}O: Just Add Water	Nominated
2008	AFI Awards	Best Lead Actress in a Television Drama	Phoebe Tonkin	Nominated
2008	AFI Awards	Best Guest or Supporting Actress in a Television Drama	Brittany Byrnes	Nominated
2008	Logie Awards	Most Outstanding Children's Program	H_{2}O: Just Add Water	Nominated
2008	Nickelodeon Australian Kids' Choice Awards	Best TV Drama Show	H_{2}O: Just Add Water	Won
2009	Nickelodeon Australian Kids' Choice Awards	Best Drama Show	H_{2}O: Just Add Water	Nominated
2009	Logie Awards	Most Outstanding Children's Program	H_{2}O: Just Add Water	Won
2011	AACTA Awards	Best Children's Television Series	H_{2}O: Just Add Water	Nominated

== Spinoffs ==
In July 2011, the production of a 26-episode spinoff was announced, which became Mako: Island of Secrets. The show follows the adventures of 15-year-old Zac and mermaids Sirena, Nixie, and Lyla. In the final series of the show, Cariba Heine makes a guest appearance as Rikki.

In May 2015, an animated spinoff targeted to children premiered on Netflix, titled H_{2}O: Mermaid Adventures.

== See also ==
- Mermaids in popular culture
