= Mermaids in popular culture =

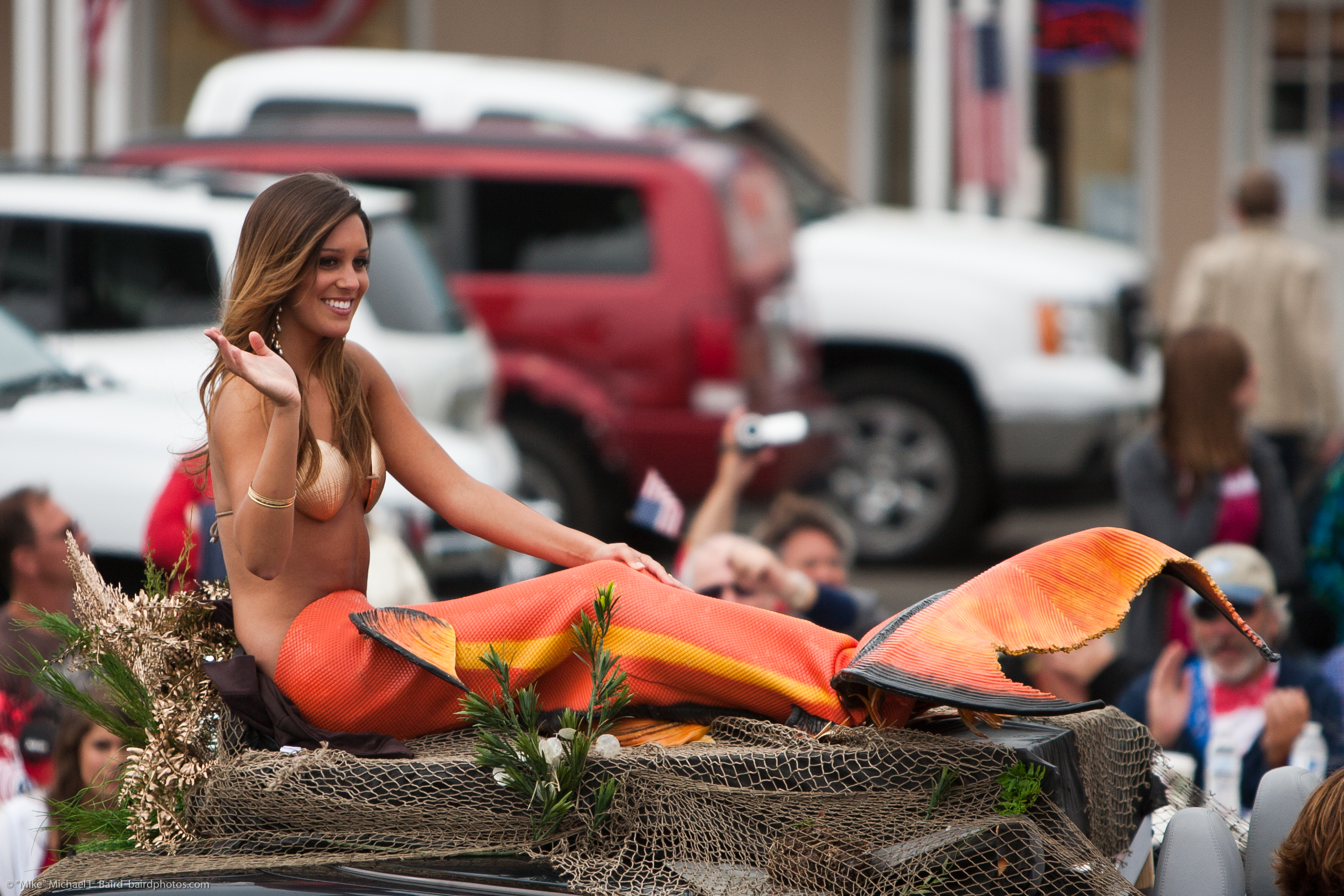
People dress in mermaid costumes for events such as parades.

Mermaids, like many other creatures of mythology and folklore, are regularly depicted in literature, film, music, and popular culture. In the folklore of some modern cultures, the concept of the siren has been assimilated to that of the mermaid. For example, the French word for mermaid is sirène, Italian sirena, and similarly in certain other European languages. This usage existed by the Middle Ages.

== Literature ==
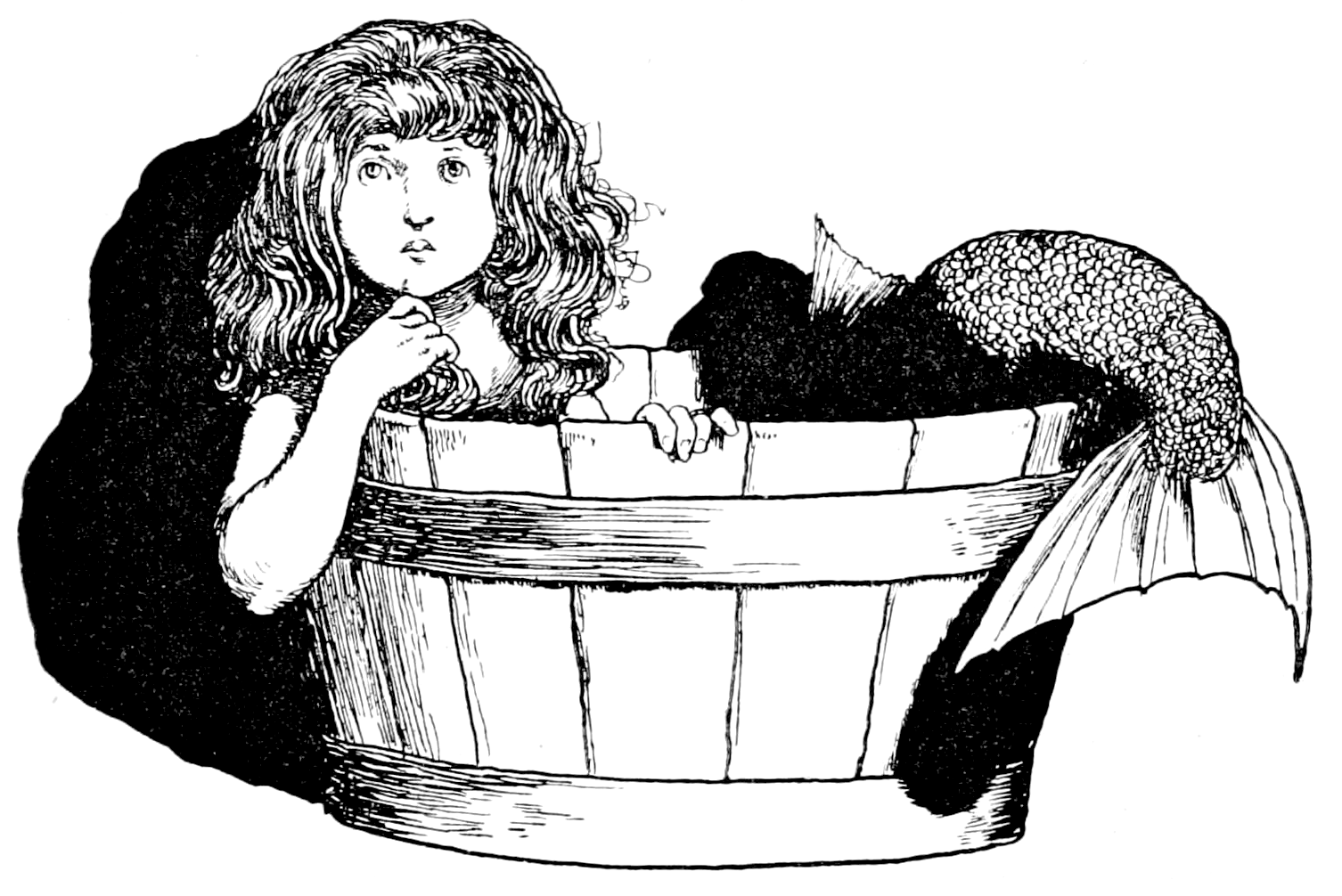
An illustration from a 1913 reprinting of Hans Christian Andersen's 1837 fairy tale The Little Mermaid

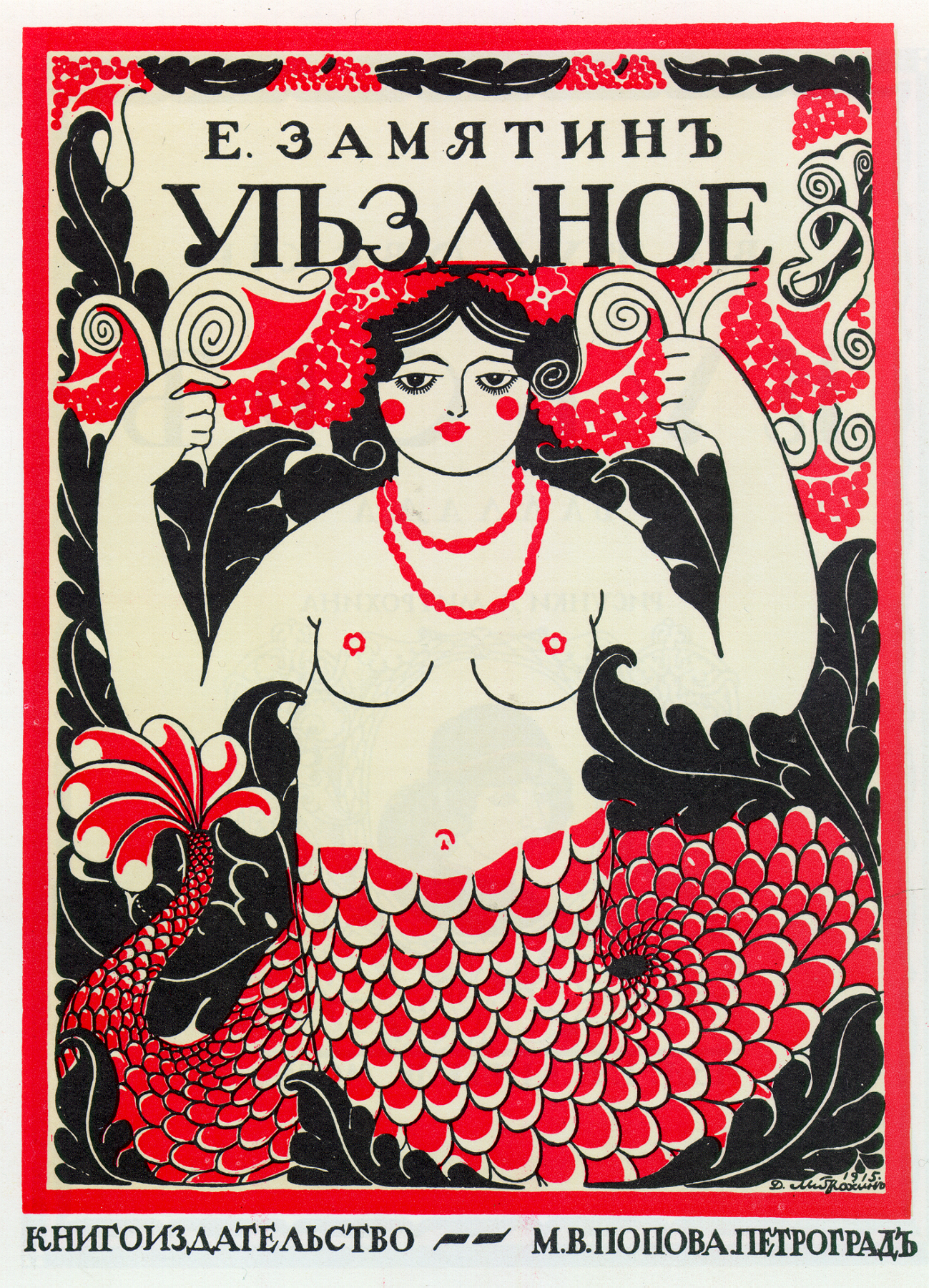
The cover of Yevgeny Zamyatin's 1913 Russian-language novel A Provincial Tale

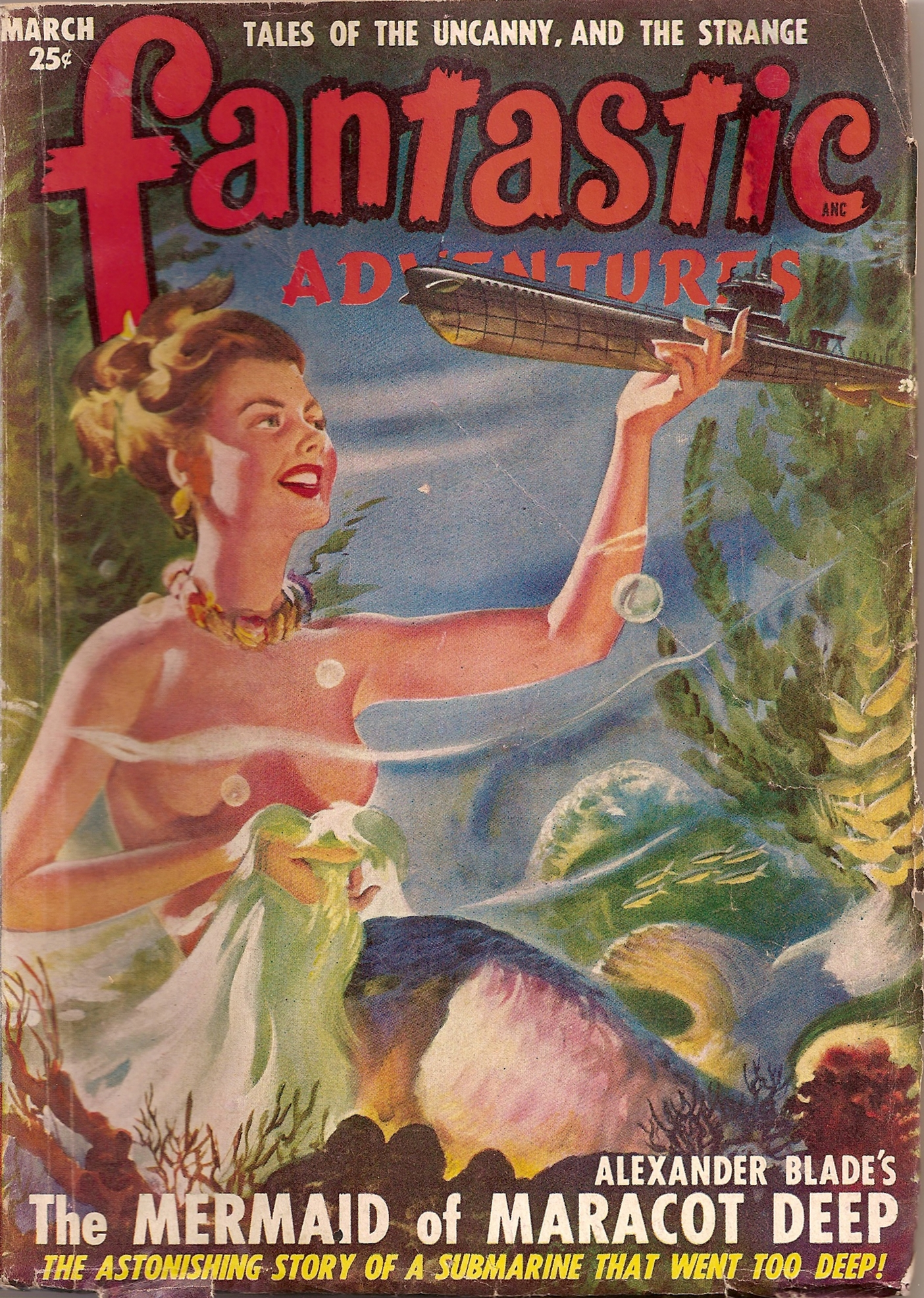
The March 1949 issue of Fantastic Adventures features the story "The Mermaid of Maracot Deep".

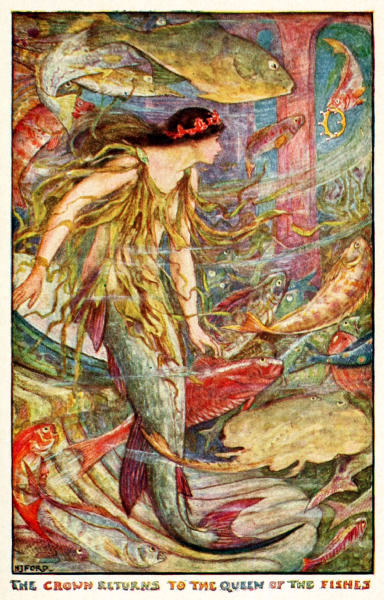
Several stories in Andrew Lang's Fairy Books feature mermaids.

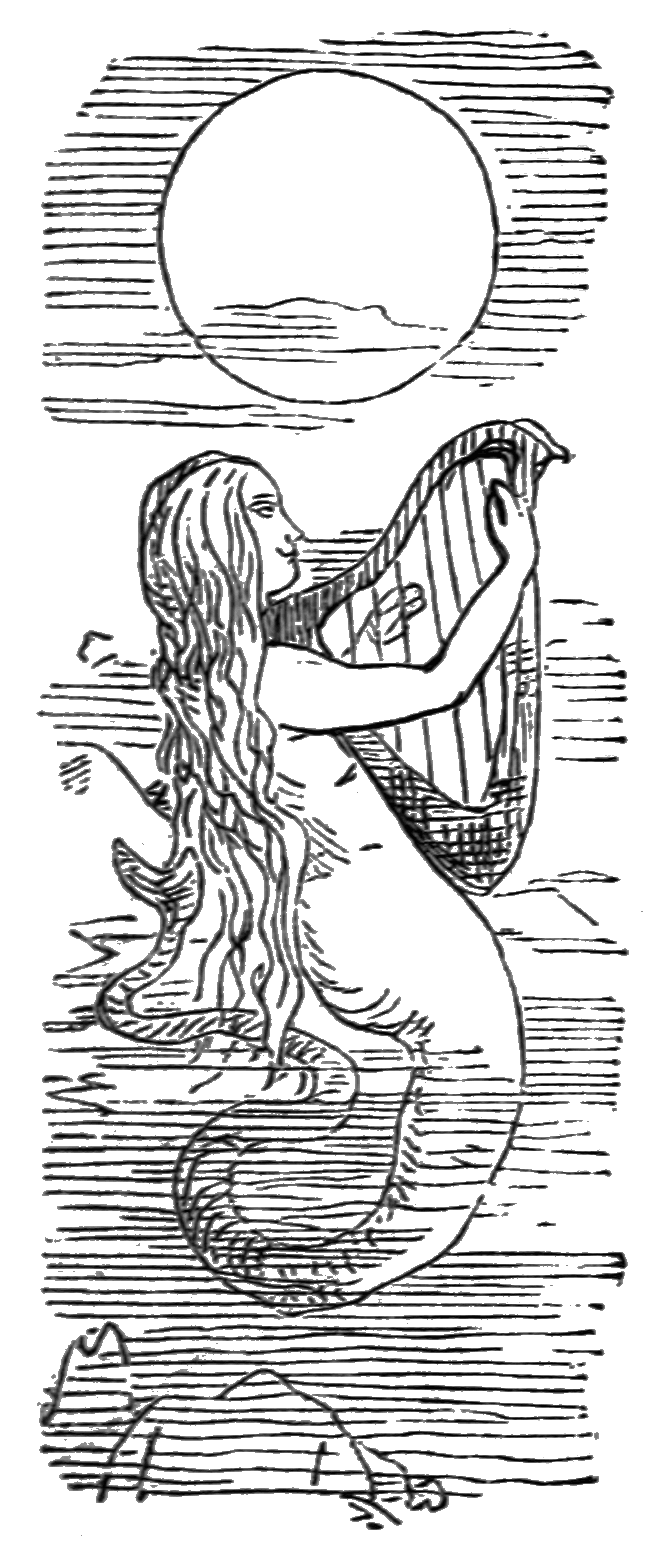
An illustration of Vanity Fair's Becky Sharp as a man-killing mermaid, by the work's author William Thackeray.

Literary Work	Year	Author	Notes
The Animal Family	1965	Randall Jarrell	Illustrated by Maurice Sendak. An orphaned mermaid finds a home in a log cabin by the sea alongside a hunter, a boy, a bear and a lynx.
Aquamarine	2001	Alice Hoffman	Two 13-year-old girls befriend a sassy teenage mermaid looking for love. It was adapted into the 2006 film of the same name by 20th Century Fox, and starring Sara Paxton, Emma Roberts and JoJo.
A Book of Mermaids	1967	Ruth Manning-Sanders	Illustrated by Robin Jacques. The 6th book in "A Book of..." series collects 16 tales of mermaids and mermen from various coastal countries.
Caleb's Friend	1993	Eric Jon Nones	When Caleb's harmonica falls out of his hand, a young merboy rescues it and the two become fast friends, a strong friendship in which each saves the other's life.
The Chronicles of Narnia	1950–1956	C. S. Lewis	In The Lion, the Witch and the Wardrobe, the first book published in The Chronicles of Narnia series, mermaids sing at the coronation of the Pevensie children. In The Voyage of the Dawn Treader, the third book of the series, Lucy Pevensie sees a group of mermaids and bonds silently with a young mermaid girl. See Adaptations of The Chronicles of Narnia
A Comb of Wishes	2022	Lisa Stringfellow	In a novel set in the Caribbean, a girl grieving her mother's death finds a mermaid's comb and is granted a wish, but the wish comes at a dangerous cost and the mermaid is plotting revenge.
Deep Trouble	1994	R. L. Stine	The 19th book in the Goosebumps series. A boy named Billy Deep finds a mermaid.
Easygoing Territory Defense by the Optimistic Lord: Production Magic Turns a Nameless Village into the Strongest Fortified City	2021–present	Sou Akaike	In this series of light novel, a mermaid-like apkallu named Lada Priora has a crush on young Van Ney Fertio, declaring herself his fiancée, much to his dismay. It is adapted into 8-volume manga and 12-episode anime.
El Regalo del Pescador (The Fisherman's Gift)	2002	Rocío del Mar Antón Blanco and Dolores Núñez Madrid	During a short overnight journey in which a fisherman tries to find "the most beautiful thing from the sea" to give to his young son, he considers a number of wonderful options without being able to make just one choice. One of the many gifts he contemplates is the following: "The fisherman thinks about his son: "I would like to give him a mermaid who sang to him by his bed". What will he bring him? There are so many beautiful things in the sea!"
Emily Windsnap series	2003–present	Liz Kessler	A teenage girl discovers she's a "Semi-Mer" and becomes a mermaid in the water.
Everworld series	1999–2001	K. A. Applegate	Mer-people live underwater in the Roman version of Atlantis.
Fantastic Beasts and Where to Find Them	2001	J. K. Rowling	A fictional textbook about the magical creatures in the Harry Potter world, including mermaids. They are described as in three different species: sirens, selkies and merrows. Similar to other humanoid magical creatures in this universe, they do not wield or understand magic themselves. They appear in the fourth and sixth books of the series.
The Goblin Tower	1968	L. Sprague de Camp	A human king falls in love with a mermaid. The story goes into hilarious detail about the couple's difficult efforts to physically consummate their love, which nearly ends in disaster (he nearly drowns in trying to have sex underwater, and she is nearly killed by his bodyguards in revenge). In the end, the king marries a human woman, though keeping a platonic friendship with the mermaid.
The History of Middle-earth: The Book of Lost Tales, Part I	1983	J. R. R. Tolkien	Edited by Christopher Tolkien. Mermaids make an appearance.
Impossible Creatures series	2023–present	Katherine Rundell	Mermaids are among the mythical creatures encountered on the magical archipelago.
In the Land of Leadale	2019–present	Ceez	Cayna discovers and rescues Mimily, a green-eyed turquoise mermaid who has been sucked into an undersea portal and trapped underneath the well near the village. Mimily later takes shelter in a communal bathhouse where she works on the laundry with her water manipulation power. It is adapted into series of manga and anime.
The Ingo tetralogy	2005–2012	Helen Dunmore	Set in Cornwall, the main characters Sapphire and Conor discover the world of Ingo. Their mer-friends Faro and Elvira teach them how to breathe underwater.
Into the Drowning Deep	2017	Mira Grant	A crew making a mockumentary on mermaids is lost at sea, and controversial leaked footage appears to show real mermaids killing them all. Seven years later, a second voyage sets out to prove the existence of the deadly and violent mermaids.
Is It Wrong to Try to Pick Up Girls in a Dungeon? (DanMachi)	2013–present	Fujino Ōmori	In this light novel series, Bell Cranel encounters a young mermaid named Marie on the 25th floor of the Dungeon. It is adapted into manga, anime, and video games.
Isadora Moon series	2016–present	Harriet Muncaster	The second book of the series, "Isadora Moon Goes Camping", introduces a mermaid character that appears in several subsequent stories.
The Islander	1998	Cynthia Rylant	Daniel, a boy who lives on a remote island off British Columbia with his grandfather, encounters what he thought at first was a mermaid but later turns out to be a sea otter.
A Journey Through Another World: Raising Kids While Adventuring	2016–present	Shizuru Minazuki	This online light novel series features mermaids living in the underwater village, including Millena. It is adapted into 9-volume manga and 12-episode anime.
Keeper	2010	Kathi Appelt	A young girl searches for her mother, Meggie Marie, whom she believes is a mermaid.
The Last Mermaid	2010	Brendan Connell	A short story in the collection Unpleasant Tales. It relates how the last mermaid in existence was brought to the table of King Carlos II of Spain.
The Little Mermaid	1837	Hans Christian Andersen	Andersen's portrayal of a mermaid shapeshifting into a human has arguably become the standard and has influenced most modern Western depictions of mermaids since it was published. It has been adapted into various media, the most famous of which are the 1989 Disney movie of the same name and the Filipino comic books Dyesebel.
Lost Voices	2011	Sarah Porter	The first in a trilogy about abused girls who become mermaids due to a traumatic event, who sing ships to their doom.
The Love Song of J. Alfred Prufrock	1915	T. S. Eliot	It uses the metaphor of mermaids to emphasize Prufock's plight: "I have heard the mermaids singing, each to each. / I do not think that they will sing to me." See: The Love Song of J. Alfred Prufrock in popular culture.
The Mermaid and Mrs. Hancock	2018	Imogen Hermes Gowar	
The Mermaid of Black Conch	2020	Monique Roffey	In St Constance, a Caribbean village on the island of Black Conch, David sings to himself in his pirogue and attracts Aycayia, a beautiful young woman cursed by jealous wives to live as a mermaid. She has been swimming the Caribbean Sea for centuries and is entranced by David and his song. Author Monique Roffey created Aycayia's character based on the Mami Wata mythology.
The Mermaid Summer	1988	Mollie Hunter	Eric Anderson must leave his island home when he incurs the wrath of a mermaid by slighting her. He can never return unless his grandchildren, Jon and Anna, confront and tame the mermaid.
Mermaid Tails: Seven Salty Stories	2021	Kyt Wright	Seven interlinked stories featuring the lives and loves of an artist and his strange half-sister set in a fictionalized version of St. Ives.
A Mermaid's Diary	2025	Chris Riddell	A shy mermaid named Atalanta Scrimshaw records her life in a diary, chronicling her efforts with friends to save her undersea home from developers planning a luxury golf resort.
Mermaid's Song	1989	Alida Van Gores	Two ocean-dwelling races, the mogs and the oppressed mermaid-like merra, fight for dominance. One merra maid named Elan sets out to compete for the coveted post of guardian to the Sea Dragons.
The Merman's Children	1979	Poul Anderson	Inspired by the story of Agnete og Havmanden, this novel follows a family of half-human, half-merfolk siblings as the realm of Faerie is slowly driven out by human influence.
Moby-Dick	1851	Herman Melville	In Chapter 126, "The Life-Buoy", the crew of the Pequod hear human-like cries in the night. Superstitious crewmen believe they are the sounds of mermaids or ghosts, which signify a bad omen. Captain Ahab scoffs at this, saying they have merely passed a seal colony in the night. His explanation does little to calm their nerves and the next day a crewman falls to his death from the masthead. See Adaptations of Moby-Dick
Monster Girl Doctor	2016–2022	Yoshino Origuchi	This light novel series includes Lulala Heine, a mermaid from the Merrow Waterways who spends most of her time above water, singing for finance to support her family after her father abandoned her. It is adapted into two-volume manga and anime TV series.
The Moon and the Sun	1997	Vonda N. McIntyre	A captured mermaid is brought to the court of King Louis XIV, where a young noblewoman begins trying to free her.
Peter and Wendy	1911	J. M. Barrie	Mermaids are the beautiful and mysterious but equally vain creatures residing in the Mermaid's Lagoon in Neverland. They only act friendly to Peter Pan but dislike all other humans, especially Wendy Darling, as they make splash on them or even attempt to drown them. See List of works based on Peter Pan
Pinkalicious	2015	Victoria Kann	One of the recurring characters, Aqua, is a tiny mermaid (called a mermini), who lives in an aquarium named after her. Her book debut, "Aqualicious", was adapted into an episode of animated series Pinkalicious & Peterrific.
Real Mermaids Series	2010–2013	Hélène Boudreau	A teen girl of partial mer-person heritage deals with both human and mermaid problems.
Restaurant to Another World	2015–present	Junpei Inuzuka	The blue mermaid priestesses, such as Arte and Camilla, are granted the ability to shapeshift into humans to even serve as patrons at the Western Restaurant Nekoya.
The Scarecrow of Oz	1915	L. Frank Baum	The main characters are rescued from danger by the mermaids.
The Sea Fairies	1911	L. Frank Baum	A novel about merfolk. Introduces the characters of Trot and Cap'n Bill, who later live in Oz.
The Sea Lady	1901	H. G. Wells	A mermaid comes ashore on the southern coast of England in 1899, mingles with genteel society under the alias "Miss Doris Thalassia Waters, the mermaid's real design is to seduce Harry Chatteris, a man she saw "some years ago" in "the South Seas—near Tonga," who has taken her fancy.
The Search for Delicious	1969	Natalie Zane Babbitt	A mermaid child named Ardis helps a boy save his kingdom.
The Shadow Over Innsmouth	1936	H. P. Lovecraft	In the novella there is a grim variant of merfolk lore via The Deep Ones. Man-fish creatures are subservient to their patron gods Father Dagon and Mother Hydra. They have an affinity for intermarrying with humans and promoting the worship of The Old Ones.
Sirena	1998	Donna Jo Napoli	A siren falls in love with a shipwrecked sailor, but is unsure if he loves her or her magical singing. This book interprets the Sirens of Greek mythology as mermaids.
The Sisters Grimm	2005–2012	Michael Buckley	Illustrated by Peter Ferguson. It features many characters from fantasy and fairy tales, including the Little Mermaid.
The Spiderwick Chronicles	2003–2009	Tony DiTerlizzi and Holly Black	The series features merfolk and other water creatures like kelpies, nixies, and sea serpents.
The Waterfire Saga	2014–2016	Jennifer Donnelly	Six young mermaids from across the world must band together to defeat an ancient evil.
Watersong	2012–2013	Amanda Hocking	The Sirens are seductive, man-eating immortals who can take a fish-tailed form when they enter the ocean. They transform a young swimmer, Gemma, into one of them.
Wet Magic	1913	E. Nesbit	Four children hear that a mermaid has been captured by a circus and rescue her. Their reward is to visit the hidden kingdom of the mermaids.
The Witcher	1986–2024	Andrzej Sapkowski	The series features merpeople being peaceful residing in the Great Sea civilization but unfriendly to humans. One most notably is a mermaid named Sh'eenaz who appeared in the short story "A Little Sacrifice" from Sword of Destiny, the second book of the series, and the Netflix animated film adaptation The Witcher: Sirens of the Deep.
Zog and the Flying Doctors	2016	Julia Donaldson	A sequel to the Zog book, illustrated by Axel Scheffler. The titular dragon, Princess Pearl, and Sir Gadabout the Great help cure the mermaid from her sunburn.

== Comic books ==
- 07-Ghost – The mermaid Lazette sings and plays an organ in a church. She can shapeshift her face into that of other people. If people eat her scales, it allows them to breathe underwater.
- Aion – This manga has several mermaids. One of them is named Sheila, the youngest of the mermaids. She falls in love with the main character, Tatsuya.
- Akazukin Chacha – In this manga, a mermaid named Marin falls in love with Riiya. She can change into a human when her tail dries out.
- Angel's Hill – In this two-volume manga by Osamu Tezuka, the residents on Angel's Island are merpeople that have the form of a human but are able to breathe underwater as well as on land. One of them is Luna, the mermaid princess of Angel's Island, who is banished to the human world where she soon trades places with her look-alike, Akemi Kusahara.
- Arabelle the Last Mermaid by Jean Ache appeared as a comic strip in the daily French newspaper France-Soir between 1950 and 1962. The character returned in various magazines until 1972. Arabelle is discovered by an American plastic surgeon on a Mediterranean island. The surgeon gives her human legs, but she retains her ability to breathe underwater. With her companion, a reformed burglar, Arabelle becomes involved in a series of light, romantic adventures.
- Ben 10 – In this four-issue comic miniseries published by IDW Publishing, while on a cruise vacation, Ben Tennyson meets Lorelai, a mermaid princess from an undersea kingdom of TerraPiscciss who is in love with him.
- In the manga Black Cat, one of the main characters, Eve, uses nanomachines to give herself transformation abilities, and once she transforms into a mermaid.
- Delicious in Dungeon – The merpeople are among the fantasy creatures featured in this manga.
- Dragon Ball – In chapter 25, "A Rival Arrives!!", Master Roshi asks Goku to bring him a pretty girl, and if he did, he would train him. Goku finds a mermaid and Master Roshi tries to hit on her. She just slaps him and jumps back into the ocean.
- In the manga/anime Fairy Tail, the main female protagonist, Lucy Heartfilia, uses celestial spirits, one of which is a mermaid called Aquarius. Also, another character, Lisanna Strauss, uses animal-based transformations, one of her tricks being to turn into a mermaid (in an anime-only episode). Furthermore, in the final arc, Lucy and another character, Brandish Mu, are temporarily turned into mermaids when Aquarius takes them to the Memory of the Stars to show them the truth about their mothers.
- Hell Teacher: Jigoku Sensei Nube – Hayame is a very ditzy mermaid who grants immortality to any humans who eat her flesh, as well as her potent healing ability through blood and her singing to control people's emotions.
- In the Name of the Mermaid Princess – The main character of this manga series is Mio Quartzlis Tenerwalt, princess of the mermaid kingdom of Blognig, who is forced to become fully a human with drugs despite being betrothed to the merman prince of Aquatia.
- The Last Mermaid – Post-apocalypse comic series written by Derek Kirk Kim and published by Image Comics about a lone mermaid who uses a Hybrid Aquatic Vehicular Chamber (or H.A.V.C. for short) to move around while keeping hydrated in water.
- Legendz – In the manga, Ken Kazaki's friend Ririko Yasuhara has a mermaid named Tetty.
- Mermaid Melody Pichi Pichi Pitch – A manga about a group of mermaid princesses who become pop singers and use their voices as weapons against their enemies.
- Mermaid Saga – A manga series by Rumiko Takahashi, which tells that when a person eats the flesh of a mermaid, he can gain immortality, but chances are that the mermaid's flesh will either kill him or transform him into a horrible creatures called "Deformed Ones". Two types of mermaids are shown in the manga. The first may gain human appearance when they eat the flesh of an immortal girl and take on her youthful looks; the second has two legs and feed on the flesh of mermaids who live in water, specifically when they are about to give birth. Besides the flesh, a mermaid's blood, ashes, and liver have different negative effects on humans. Mermaid's blood can sustain a person's youth, but it can't stop their insides from aging, therefore partially tuning them into a Deformed One. Ashes can give flowers immortality, but can only revive dead humans temporarily. A mermaid's liver was used to revive a dead girl but gave her a need to feed on the livers of living things.
- Merman in My Tub – The manga/anime series features Wakasa, a blonde merman who is washed ashore from his home in a polluted river and is taken into care of his human roommate, Tatsumi, in the bathtub.
- The manga Monster Musume features a mermaid named Meroune Lorelei, often referred to simply as "Mero", as a major character. She is from a noble family and has an obsession with the classic fairy tale "The Little Mermaid". As a result, she desires a tragic romance. There is also Yatsume, a lamprey-type mermaid who is one of the three blood-sucking liminal girls.
- My Bride Is a Mermaid – In this manga, the main character, Nagasumi Michishio is saved from drowning by a mermaid, Sun Seto. Afterward, Nagasumi is forced to marry Sun.
- Namor the Sub-Mariner debuted in 1939 as the first superhero of the Marvel Universe. He was born of Homo mermanus, a race of aquatic humanoids. Namor's father was human however, giving him attributes of both races. He is able to exist both on land and at sea, possesses superhuman strength, and can fly via the winglike fins on his ankles. A prince of the undersea kingdom of Atlantis, he would later ascend to the throne as its king. He has a history of hostility towards human civilization but has also been a tenuous ally.
- Ningyohime no Gomen ne Gohan – Era, the mermaid princess who is distraught of her fish friends being caught by fishermen, is forced to eat seafood while she's in her human form.
- One Piece – The manga and its franchise have many mermaids, most notably Kokoro, Camie and Princess Shirahoshi.
- Rave Master – The character Celia is a beautiful young mermaid with long blue hair. She is the younger sister of the Queen of the underwater mermaid village, Mildesta. She falls deeply in love with the main protagonist, Haru Glory.
- Sailor Moon – Sailor Aluminum Siren is a mermaid-type humanoid and one of the Sailor Animamates serving for Shadow Galactica. She also appeared in the anime series adaptation Sailor Moon Sailor Stars and the two-part anime film Sailor Moon Cosmos.
- In the manga/anime Saint Seiya, Mermaid Thetis is one of Poseidon's Mariners who represents a mermaid at first before assuming a humanoid form for a battle.
- Starstruck – The character Eeeeeeeeeeluh, a psychic fish woman, has appeared in various incarnations of the science fiction comic series Starstruck, by Elaine Lee and Michael Wm. Kaluta: in the stage play, the comic book stories, a print portfolio, and posters.
- Superman – The comic book superhero Superman had a romantic love interest with a mermaid named Lori Lemaris. Her first appearance was in 1959. The name Lori Lemaris was probably drawn from Lorelei rock in the Rhine added to maris, from the Latin mare, meaning ocean. She has the initials L.L., the same as several of Superman's other love interests including Lois Lane and Lana Lang.
- This Monster Wants to Eat Me – In this yuri horror manga series, a carnivorous mermaid named Shiori Oumi wishes to eat a human teenage girl by promising her protection from yōkai.
- To the Abandoned Sacred Beasts – In this manga/anime series, Beatrice Serrault becomes an Incarnate Soldier, taking a form of a siren, with a power of "song" to vibrate her wings and affect her opponents' minds.
- Toilet-Bound Hanako-kun – The female protagonist Nene Yashiro swallows the mermaid's scale to grant her wish for a boyfriend. But the mermaid is a dangerous creature as her scale actually inflicts Yashiro and transforms her into a fish.
- Triton of the Sea – The character Pipiko is a mermaid girl who survived the genocide of the Poseidon clan.
- Urusei Yatsura – In chapter 125, "Pool Spooks! Burning with Forbidden Love", Lum decides to help and with Shinobu's help, they dress as two mermaids.

== Films ==
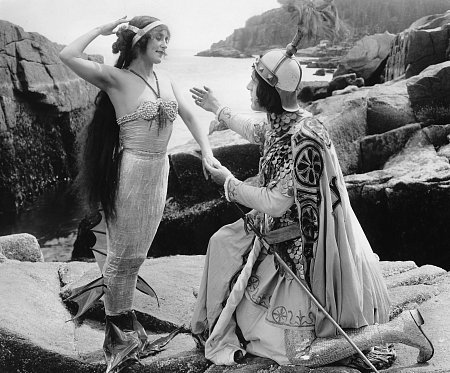
Annette Kellerman (left) as the titular mermaid in the 1918 film Queen of the Sea

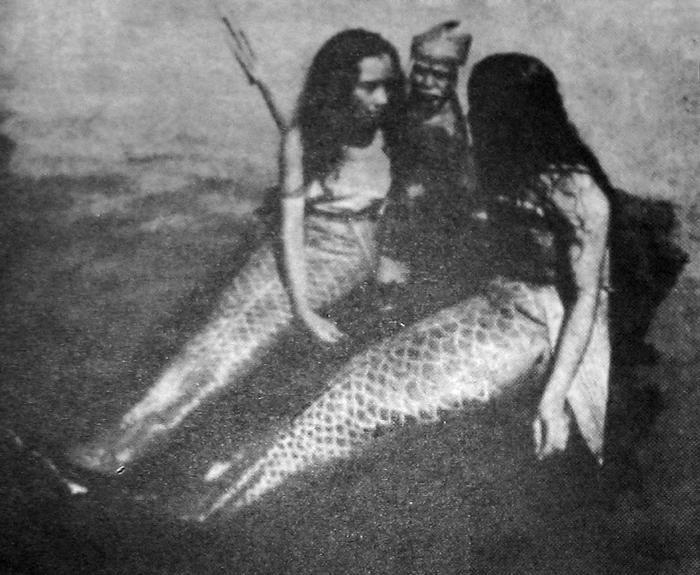
The 1941 Dutch East Indies film Ikan Doejoeng featured mermaids.

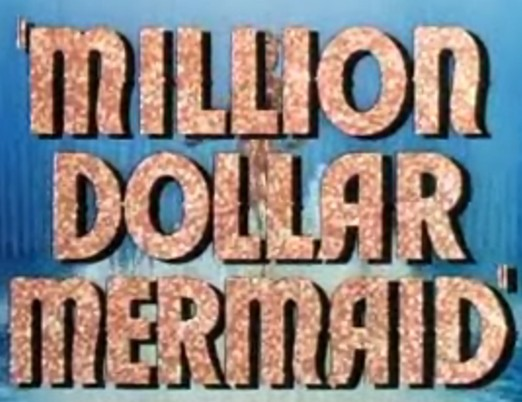
The 1952 film Million Dollar Mermaid is based on the life of Annette Kellerman, the first actress to portray a mermaid swimming in film.

Film	Year	Notes
The Mermaid	1904	Silent film by Georges Méliès and starring an unknown actress as The Mermaid. This whimsical, four-minute-long film is the first to feature mermaids.
Siren of the Sea (or The Mermaid)	1911	Silent film starring Annette Kellerman as the first mermaid to actually swim in a costume tail in a film.
Neptune's Daughter	1914	Starring Annette Kellerman.
A Daughter of the Gods	1916	Starring Annette Kellerman.
Queen of the Sea	1918	Starring Annette Kellerman.
Venus of the South Seas	1924	Starring Annette Kellerman.
King Neptune	1932	King Neptune and an array of sea creatures come to the rescue of a mermaid captured by lecherous pirates in this Walt Disney Silly Symphony cartoon.
Betty Boop's Life Guard	1934	In this Betty Boop short film, while drowning underwater, Betty imagines herself as a mermaid until her boyfriend Fearless Fred saves her and wakes her up.
Mr. and Mrs. Is the Name	1935	Released by Warner Bros. Pictures; the Merrie Melodies cartoon short centers on a merboy and a mermaid girl resembling Buddy and Cookie.
Merbabies	1938	This Silly Symphony short revolves around a large group of diminutive-sized merchildren materializing out of the crashing ocean surf and conducting an underwater circus along with various sea creatures.
Ikan Doejoeng	1941	From the Dutch East Indies.
Miranda	1948	Starring Glynis Johns as a flirtatious mermaid who goes on land disguised in a wheelchair.
Mr. Peabody and the Mermaid	1948	Starring Ann Blyth; a man on vacation encounters a mute and alluring mermaid whom he tries to hide at his resort. It is based on the 1945 novel Peabody's Mermaid by Guy Pearce and Constance Bridges Jones.
Million Dollar Mermaid	1952	Based on the life of Annette Kellerman.
Peter Pan	1953	Produced by Walt Disney and released by RKO Radio Pictures. The mermaids have a minor role in the film, as they live in the mermaid lagoon. The mischievous mermaids enjoy tormenting Wendy, but flee at the sight of Captain Hook.
Mad About Men	1954	Sequel to Miranda (1948).
Pekka ja Pätkä sammakkomiehinä (Pekka and Pätkä as Frogmen)	1957	In this Finnish Pekka Puupää comedy, the heroes rescue a foundered mermaid and carry her to Pekka's apartment. They set her on the bathtub. Pekka's wife Justiina initially sees only her fish-tail and is initially surprised by "a big fish the menfolks have caught" and gets a knife to prepare it as a dinner, but she faints as she sees the mermaid's upper body.
Night Tide	1961	Starring Linda Lawson and Dennis Hopper
Mermaids of Tiburon	1962	Starring Diane Webber, George Rowe, and Timothy Carey
Beach Blanket Bingo	1965	Starring Frankie Avalon and Annette Funicello, this includes a sub-plot of the character Bonehead (Jody McCrea) falling for a mermaid portrayed by Lost in Space's Marta Kristen.
The Daydreamer	1966	Produced by Rankin/Bass Animated Entertainment, this features the stop-motion animation sequence based on "The Little Mermaid".
Head	1968	Starring The Monkees, briefly features two mermaids in the opening "Porpoise Song" sequence, surrounded by psychedelic effects.
Siren	1968	Animated short film
Hans Christian Andersen's The Little Mermaid	1975	Produced by Toei Animation, a Japanese film adaptation of a classic tale features the two main characters: a young blonde mermaid named Marina, and her dolphin calf friend named Fritz.
Local Hero	1984	Marine researcher Marina (Jenny Seagrove) is suspected by her love interest of being a mermaid.
Splash	1984	Starring Tom Hanks and Daryl Hannah, Hannah plays a mermaid who falls in love with a human. She can walk on dry land when in human form, but her legs change into a fish tail whenever she gets wet. Much of the movie revolves around her humorous attempts to conceal her true identity from her lover. A made-for-television sequel, Splash, Too followed in 1988, starring Amy Yasbeck and Todd Waring.
Talk Dirty to Me Part III	1984	The third and fourth films in the adult film series Talk Dirty to Me feature mermaids who come ashore to find men. As in Splash, a mermaid can walk on dry land, and her legs become tails in water. The film endured controversy when it became public knowledge in 1986 that, at the time of filming, actress Traci Lords was 16-year-old and, therefore, underage in the US.
Mermaid in the Manhole	1988	The fourth film in the Japanese horror film series Guinea Pig. A Tokyo-based shock film centered around a decaying mermaid found living in the Tokyo sewer system. This is a very gruesome film; it focuses on the mermaid's decay and subsequent death from exposure to toxic environment of the sewer.
Kalamazoo	1988	A Montreal man (Rémy Girard) imagines a mermaid in place of the writer (Marie Tifo) whose picture appears on a novel.
The Little Mermaid	1989	Produced by Walt Disney Studios, this film portrays a variant of the story by Hans Christian Andersen about Ariel, the mermaid princess who wished for legs. This film was followed by a prequel TV series (The Little Mermaid), a direct-to-video sequel titled The Little Mermaid II: Return to the Sea featuring the title character's daughter, and a DTV prequel movie in 2008 titled The Little Mermaid: Ariel's Beginning. A live-action adaptation of the original film directed by Rob Marshall was released in 2023.
Hook	1991	Produced by TriStar Pictures Amblin Entertainment, three mermaids appear when Peter Pan (Robin Williams) is dropped into the ocean in Neverland.
The Secret of Roan Inish	1994	Incorporates mysticism into the selkies and their fae children.
Mermaid Got Married	1994	This Hong Kong romantic-comedy (based on Splash) tells the story of a school teacher who falls in love with a mermaid who'd rescued him as a young boy. The film stars Asian cinema idols Ekin Cheng, Christy Chung, and Takeshi Kaneshiro.
Magic Island	1995	Lily, a young mermaid, befriends a group of buccaneers and joins them on their quest for Blackbeard's treasure.
De Zeemeerman	1996	Dutch comedy centered around a smelly young man (Daniël Boissevain) who is accidentally transformed into a merman by a potion given from a mad professor (Jérôme Reehuis).
Sabrina Down Under	1999	Sabrina (Melissa Joan Hart) travels to Australia's Great Barrier Reef with her best friend Gwen (Tara Charendoff), a fellow witch from England, for a week-long vacation where they try to help protect a hidden mermaid colony whose habitat is threatened by ocean pollution, and by a local marine biologist, Dr. Julian Martin.
The Thirteenth Year	1999	A teen boy learns that his birth mother is a mermaid after he begins to grow fins and slimy scales on his thirteenth birthday.
The Tangerine Bear	2000	Produced by Hyperion Animation for Family Home Entertainment. A teddy bear with an accidental upside-down mouth meets a mermaid alarm clock named Lorelei at a small antique shop.
She Creature	2001	Circa 1900, a carnival barker named Angus discovers a mermaid held captive in a tank by a disturbed old man. Angus steals the mermaid and loads her on a ship headed for America. When the mermaid is discovered, Angus's lover Lily begins to suspect that the mermaid is more dangerous than she first seemed.
Mermaids	2003	Erika Heynatz, Nikita Ager, and Sarah Laine are a trio of mermaids who solve their father's murder.
Peter Pan	2003	Mermaids appear in a small segment: the narrator says they "are not like the mermaids in stories" though Wendy is thrilled by them. These mermaids have webbed fingers, sharp teeth and markings on their faces. Peter asks them if Captain Hook has kidnapped John and Michael, which the mermaids confirm. One of them also tries to drown Wendy.
Tentacolino (In Search of the Titanic)	2004	The Italian-North Korean animated fantasy features the merpeople that have legs with flippers for feet. It is a sequel to The Legend of the Titanic (1999).
The SpongeBob SquarePants Movie	2004	Princess Mindy, a mermaid who is the daughter of King Neptune, helps SpongeBob and Patrick retrieve the crown from Shell City.
Sirène Song	2005	Short feature by Fanny Jean-Noël. A woman dressed as a mermaid is seeking for a job.
Tom and Jerry: The Fast and the Furry	2005	In the animated direct-to-video film, racer Steed Dirkly spots a mermaid on an island, but it turns out she is a Mirahna, a cannibalistic mermaid who feeds Steed to her offspring. She is a cross between a mermaid and a piranha, with a beautiful body, long orange hair, yellow seashells for a bra, a magenta fish tail, aquatic fish ears, and the head of a piranha.
Harry Potter and the Goblet of Fire	2005	Merpeople appear briefly during the second task.
The Lion, the Witch and the Wardrobe	2005	Mermaids appear briefly at the end of the story.
Barbie Fairytopia: Mermaidia	2006	In this Barbie doll direct-to-video movie, Elina travels to Mermaidia to save her friend Nalu, the merman prince, who has been kidnapped by the evil Laverna. It's up to Elina to stop them with the help of Nori, a headstrong mermaid who does not trust outsiders. It is a sequel to Barbie: Fairytopia (2005).
Aquamarine	2006	The title character is a mermaid (Sara Paxton) who is washed ashore after a violent storm. She decides to search for true love on land and makes two good human friends (Joanna "JoJo" Levesque and Emma Roberts) along the way.
Legend of Sudsakorn	2006	The main character, Charlie Trairat, is the son of a mermaid who is sent on a magical quest to find his father, a prince.
Fishtales	2007	A widowed father (Billy Zane) falls in love with a mermaid named Neried (Kelly Brook), who takes on a human form during the night.
Barbie: Mariposa and Her Butterfly Fairy Friends	2008	This Barbie doll direct-to-video film features mermaids living in the underwater realm of the Waterwhirls, including the twin sisters Coral and Anemone.
Duyung	2008	Malaysian comedy film starring Maya Karin and Saiful Apek.
Princess	2008	ABC Family television film featuring Shileen Paton as a mermaid named Cala who lives under the pond.
Roxy Hunter and the Myth of the Mermaid	2008	The third installment of the Roxy Hunter telefilm series aired on Nickelodeon. Roxy (Aria Wallace) helps an amnesiac mermaid (Ashleigh Rains) to find a way home in the sea.
Ponyo	2008	Studio Ghibli anime film directed by creator Hayao Miyazaki about a goldfish who wants to become a human girl due to her relationship with a young boy.
Bedtime Stories	2008	A mermaid appears in the book that Skeeter gives to Bobbi and Patrick.
Doraemon: Nobita's Great Battle of the Mermaid King	2010	Doraemon, Nobita, Shizuka, Gian and Suneo befriend Sophia, the mermaid princess from an ancient underwater kingdom, and find themselves amid a conflict between the mermaids and the mermen.
Barbie in a Mermaid Tale	2010	In this Barbie doll direct-to-video movie, Barbie stars as Merliah Summers, a surfing champion from Malibu. One minute she's a normal teenager and the next she learns a shocking family secret: she's a mermaid! Merliah and her dolphin friend Zuma set off on an undersea adventure to rescue her mother, Queen Calissa of Oceana.
Hoshisuna no Shima no Chiisana Tenshi (Mermaid Smile)	2010	Japanese film starring D-Boys members Tetsuya Makita and Masashi Mikami, and Riho Iida of Love Live! fame. The story is of a girl who is found washed up on the shore in a tourist area of Okinawa and suspected of being a mermaid.
Empires of the Deep	2011	A human falls in love with a mermaid in a fantasy world.
Pirates of the Caribbean: On Stranger Tides	2011	During their search for the Fountain of Youth, Jack Sparrow and his crew encounter several mermaids dwelling in Whitecap Bay.
Small Fry	2011	Part of the Toy Story Toons short animations. Buzz Lightyear meets a plastic toy mermaid named Neptuna who always carries her trident and sits on a rock.
Barbie in a Mermaid Tale 2	2012	In this Barbie doll direct-to-video movie sequel, Merliah heads to Australia for the ultimate surfing competition. When the evil mermaid Eris escapes from her whirlpool, thanks to Kylie Morgan who steals Merliah's necklace, with plans to take Calissa's spot on the throne of Aquellia and get the power of Merilia, Merliah and her sea friends dive in to stop her.
Ice Age: Continental Drift	2012	In the cases of Sid the Sloth and Captain Gutt, the fish-like creatures called sirens shapeshift into a mermaid-themed sloth (mersloth) and a mermaid-themed ape (merape) and near the end of the film, the latter traumatizes the tyrant ape by eating him.
The Legend of Sarila	2013	Features a mermaid-like goddess named Sedna.
Barbie: The Pearl Princess	2014	In this Barbie doll direct-to-video movie Barbie stars as Lumina, a mermaid who dreams of being a princess. Lumina and her best friend Kuda, a pink seahorse, embark on an adventure to a majestic mer-kingdom called Seagundia. There, she discovers that her magic is the key to unlocking her true destiny and ultimately saving the kingdom.
Maidens of the Sea	2014	The second feature film by writer/director Kerri Kuchta, this film tells the story of a lonely sailor who discovers an island of mermaids.
Killer Mermaid	2014	Horror film directed by Milan Todorovic
Barbie and the Secret Door	2014	This Barbie doll direct-to-video movie includes Romy, a mermaid who loses her tail under the threat of the spoiled princess Malucia.
The Lure	2015	Polish horror-musical film directed by Agnieszka Smoczyńska which chronicles two carnivorous mermaids who begin working as nightclub performers in 1980s Warsaw.
A Mermaid's Tale	2016	A twelve-year-old girl befriends a quirky teenage mermaid who's anything but mythical, and their friendship could heal an age-old feud.
The Mermaid	2016	Chinese film starring Lin Yun and directed by the Hong Kong comedian Stephen Chow.
Lu Over the Wall	2017	Japanese anime film about a ningyo girl who forms an unlikely friendship with a teenage boy.
Scales: Mermaids Are Real	2017	A young girl named Siren Philips (Emmy Perry) faces the bittersweet reality that, on the eve of her twelfth birthday, she is destined to turn into a mermaid.
Barbie Dolphin Magic	2017	In this Barbie doll direct-to-video film, Barbie, her sisters Skipper, Stacie and Chelsea, and Ken help Isla the mermaid rescue the four Gemstone Dolphins from the marine facility. Isla uses her shell necklace to magically transform her tail into human legs.
My Fairy Tail Love Story	2018	A girl finds a rock while diving and becomes a mermaid.
Ozero myortvykh (The Mermaid: The Lake of the Dead)	2018	Russian horror film inspired by Slavic mythology directed by Svyatoslav Podgaevskiy.
The Little Mermaid	2018	A mermaid named Elizabeth (Poppy Drayton) is forced by an evil wizard to eternally live a life away from her ocean home enslaved in the circus in Mississippi.
Aquaman	2018	One of the seven separated nations in Atlantis is the merfolk-like people called the Fishermen.
The Lighthouse	2019	Several parts of the movie involve Winslow having visions of a mermaid, including having sexual intercourse with it.
Onward	2020	Mermaids in this film are portrayed to have ears that look like fish fins in addition to their fishlike tails. In the trailer, one of the mermaids is shown relaxing in an inflatable pool.
A Mermaid in Paris	2020	French romantic comedy film starring Marilyn Lima and Nicolas Duvauchelle.
Ten-Cent Daisy	2021	The youngest of three sisters is secretly a mermaid with healing powers, although she can only take mermaid form in her home waters of the Caribbean. The movie also mentions African-Caribbean legends of the fate of prisoners thrown from slave ships.
Secret Magic Control Agency	2021	A white mermaid princess with blond hair tied in ox horns is found in one of the cages at the circus, so Agent Gretel foils the ringmaster and the two strongmen to set the mermaid free and she in return gives her metallic seashell pendant as part of her gratitude. She turns out to be the daughter of the golden-dressed mermaid queen who encounters Hansel and Gretel as children. There are also other colored mermaids who live in their own kingdom and all these mermaids can change their tails into legs depending on where they surface.
Barbie: Mermaid Power	2022	A sequel to Barbie Dolphin Magic. "Malibu" Barbie and her sisters and their friend "Brooklyn" Barbie are summoned by Isla to compete to be the Power Keeper who can ensure the safety of the mermaid kingdom of Pacifica.
Ruby Gillman, Teenage Kraken	2023	In this DreamWorks Animation film, mermaids are the evil, power-hungry enemies of noble, protective krakens.
Barbie	2023	Produced by Mattel Films and distributed by Warner Bros. Pictures. Dua Lipa and John Cena played Mermaid Barbie and Merman Ken, respectively, in the live-action Barbie doll film.
The Little Mermaid	2024	Horror film adaptation of Hans Christian Andersen's fairy tale starring Lydia Helen and Mike Markoff and directed by Leigh Scott.
ChaO	2025	Produced by Studio 4°C in Japan. A mermaid princess becomes engaged to a human engineer.

== Television ==
Show	Year	Notes
Adventures of Sonic the Hedgehog	1993	In episode 56 "The Little Merhog", Sonic the Hedgehog and Tails help Merna, the mermaid-themed hedgehog (merhog), protect an underwater grotto from the threat of Captain John Paul Memo.
Adventures of the Gummi Bears	1985–1991	In 1987 season 3 episode 5 "Water Way to Go", Sunni and Gusto Gummi meet Aquarianne, a mermaid on the beach who is captured by Duke Igthorn in an attempt to use her large leviathan companion Finwithit to attack the Kingdom of Dunwyn.
Aladdin	1994–1995	In the season 2 episode "Elemental, My Dear Jasmine", an evil mermaid sorceress named Saleen traps Princess Jasmine underwater and turns her tail into human legs in her attempt to win over Aladdin. In another episode "Shark Treatment", she turns Aladdin into a shark. Saleen is also associated with an octopus named Armand.
American Dragon: Jake Long	2005–2007	There are two mermaids featured in this Disney Channel animated series; Silver who is afraid of water and a medical science prodigy, and Ms. Dolores Derceto who works as a junior high school principal while on wheelchair.
Amy, la niña de la mochila azul	2004	The eponymous child character in this Mexican telenovela is guided by Coral the mermaid (Tatiana Palacios Chapa) in order to protect the orphanage from evil.
Aquaman	2006	The main antagonist of the television pilot is Nadia (Adrianne Palicki), a killer siren/mermaid-like creature.
Aryana	2012–2013	The Philippine drama-fantasy series on ABS-CBN starring Ella Cruz as a titular heroine who is raised by a mermaid.
Austin & Ally	2011–2016	In season 3 episode 11 "Directors & Divas", the spoiled actress Brandy Braxton (Grace Gillam) takes the role of a mermaid for the upcoming film called The Pilot and the Mermaid.
Bakugan Battle Brawlers	2009–2010	In this anime, Klaus's guardian Bakugan, Sirenoid, is a mermaid.
Baywatch	1989–2001	Marliece Andrada plays a mermaid in the episode "Rendezvous".
Ben & Holly's Little Kingdom	2009–2013	In episode 46 of season 2 "The Mermaid", Lucy and her dad find a glittery mirror on the bottom of the lake, which actually belongs to Oceana the red-haired blue mermaid who needs it back.
Bermuda Triangle: Colorful Pastrale	2019	The Japanese anime series that involves five young mermaids, Cora, Sonata, Kanon, Fina and Serena, going through normal everyday lives underwater.
Black Cat	2005–2006	One of the main characters, Eve, uses nanomachines to give herself transformation abilities, and once she transforms into a mermaid.
Black Clover	2017–present	In the 2021 season 4 episode 11 "Water Crusade", Noelle Silva unlocks the Mermaid Form variant of her Valkyrie Armor which increases her power underwater, including her swimming speed.
Bubble Guppies	2011–2023	This Nick Jr. animated series revolves around a group of seven merfolk preschoolers, named Molly, Gil, Goby, Deema, Oona, Nonny and Zooli.
Camp Lakebottom	2013–2017	In the first half of episode 17 of season 1, "McGee the Mermaid", while water fighting, the three main characters accidentally revive the evil mermaid who floods the titular summer camp in her first step towards the domination of Earth.
A Centaur's Life	2017	The mermaid students attend 14th Aquatic High School. One of them, Eri, is a mermaid-satyress hybrid.
Charmed	1998–2006	In the 2002 fifth-season episode "A Witch's Tail", a mermaid (Jaime Pressly) enlists the help of main character Phoebe Halliwell (Alyssa Milano) to fight against a sea witch. Mermaid was a Charmed spin-off developed for The WB, since the theme of mermaids was recognized to have potential for its own series, and a one-hour pilot was filmed. However, after The WB and the UPN merged into The CW channel, the resulting network passed on the series.
Chloe's Closet	2010–2014	The main character Chloe Corbin and her friends Tara, Daniela and Lilian transform into mermaids in three episodes "Purple Like Me", "He's Got Rhythm" and "Catch of the Day". One episode "Singing at Sea" features the singing mermaid trio called the Mermaid-ettes.
Clutch Cargo	1959–1960	In this series' story arc, "The Missing Mermaid", a mermaid named Minnie is captured by the spies, and Clutch Cargo and his friends must rescue her.
Cutie Honey	1973–1974	One of Honey Kisaragi's transformations is a mermaid, which she uses to survive harsh weather conditions at sea.
Cyberchase	2002–present	A cyber-mermaid named Binary lives in the Aquari-yum. She is green and purple, and she works as a gatekeeper and tames several sea animals.
Danny and the Mermaid	1978	A pilot episode for a series that didn't get picked up. It was a 30-minute sci-fi comedy starring Ray Walston (famous for his previous successful series My Favorite Martian). Walston played Professor Stoneman, helping his student apprentice Danny Stevens (Patrick Collins) to be an oceanographer. Danny first learns of the mermaid, Aqua (Harlee McBride), a colorful blond mermaid with blue eyes and iridescent scales, when she swims by one of the portholes in their underwater lab. Later, he meets her and she communicates with them through a hatch on the lab's floor.
Dexter's Laboratory	1996–2003	In the episode "Ocean Commotion," while the family visit in the beach, Dee Dee (in a mermaid costume) gets kidnapped by some maniac sailors, and Dexter and the whale are the only ones to save her. This is a parody of Disney's The Little Mermaid, and of Moby Dick.
Digimon Fusion	2010–2012	Mermaimon is a sea creature-type Digimon that resembles a mermaid with a pirate-like style.
Disenchantment	2018–2023	One of the secondary characters in this adult animation series is Mora the Mermaid, who is the princess of Mermaid Island and the love interest of Princess Bean.
Doc McStuffins	2012–2020	In season 1 episode 20 "Get Set to Get Wet", Dottie McStuffins and her toy friends help Melinda, the wind-up toy mermaid who keeps sinking to the bottom of the wading pool, to learn how to swim. Melinda also appeared in a few further episodes such as "Swimmer's Belly" and "Mermaid in the Midfield".
Doctor Who	1963–present	In the sixth season, a mermaid or siren-like creature appears in the episode "The Curse of the Black Spot".
Dora the Explorer	2007	This Nick Jr. series features several mermaids that live in a mermaid kingdom, including Mariana and Maribel, introduced from the season 4 special "Dora Saves the Mermaids".
Dragonball	1986–1989	Goku has to meet Master Roshi's demand to bring a beautiful girl to him to receive his teachings; one of the girls he brings is a mermaid, much to Roshi's surprise.
Dyesebel	2008	A drama-fantasy series based on Mars Ravelo's creation in GMA Network in the Philippines. Marina is also a drama-fantasy series in ABS-CBN and Marinara is a comedy-fantasy series in GMA Network.
Dyosa	2008–2009	In this Philippine drama series on ABS-CBN, one of Josephine Sinukuan's transformations is a mermaid, which she uses to harness the power of water.
El Chavo Animado	2006–2014	In the 2010 episode "Aventura Submarina (Submarine Adventure)" (episode 9 (87 of the entire series), season 4) El Chavo meets three kindhearted mermaid princesses during a vacation trip alongside the rest of his friends in Acapulco who offer to take him to their underwater kingdom after mistaking him for a teenage merman prince who has apparently gone missing but who returns shortly thereafter, explaining he only wished to explore the human world for a few days. Quico, Noño, Paty and La Popis also try to rescue El Chavo in a submarine after witnessing the mermaids submerging their friend near the beach. When the children try to tell the rest of their friends about their adventure, the adults of the group don't believe them and tell them it was only a dream.
Elena of Avalor	2016–2020	In the 2018 special "Song of the Sirenas" (episode 15 (40 of the entire series), season 2), Princess Elena and her royal family visit the coastal city of Nueva Vista where she unexpectedly meets the two siblings, Princess Marisa and Prince Marzel, who are half-merfolk due to their mother Queen Camila being originally a human.
Ever After High	2013–2019	Meeshell Mermaid, daughter of the Little Mermaid.
Faerie Tale Theatre	1982–1987	In an episode, Treat Williams and Pam Dawber help stage a production of The Little Mermaid that follows Andersen's story much more closely than the Disney film that came out three years later.
The Fairly OddParents	2001–2017	Episodes "Something's Fishy!" and "Dadlantis" occasionally feature the merfolk living in Atlantis.
Fairy Tail	2009–2019	The main female protagonist, Lucy Heartfilia, uses celestial spirits, one of which is a mermaid called Aquarius. Also, another character, Lisanna Strauss, uses animal-based transformations, and one of her tricks is to turn into a mermaid (in an anime-only episode). Furthermore, in the final arc, Lucy and another character, Brandish Mu, are temporarily turned into mermaids when Aquarius takes them to the Memory of the Stars to show them the truth about their mothers.
Fantasy Island	1977–1984	Mermaids are occasionally depicted as being in conflict with Mr. Rourke (Ricardo Montalbán). Most notably Princess Nyah (portrayed by Michelle Phillips of The Mamas & the Papas fame), who appeared in three episodes in 1979, 1980 and 1984.
The Flintstones	1960–1966	In the season 5 episode "Adobe Dick", Fred Flintstone sees Captain Blah dancing with a mermaid. In the season 6 episode "Dripper", Barney Rubble is briefly infatuated with Mamie the mermaid on display at a public aquarium.
Flipper	1995–2000	In 1997 season 2 episode 17 "Mermaid Island", Dean Gregson (Scott Michaelson) finds a mermaid (Rachel Blakely) in one of his dives. Michaelson played a merman in Sabrina Down Under.
Gabby's Dollhouse	2021–present	MerCat, a mermaid-type toy cat, makes "spa-themed" science in the bathroom and can also float in midair to get around.
GeGeGe no Kitarō	1968–2020	In the 1985 series episode 100, Kitarō rescues the Mermaid Queen from the evil yōkai hunters. In the 2018 series episode 90, a group of the mermaid idols requests Kitarō to retrieve the merchild who has been held captive by the Sazae-oni who impersonates Kitarō.
Goodbye, Lara	2026	A modern reimagining of Hans Christian Andersen's The Little Mermaid, the plot of the anime series is an original continuation of the story, in which the eponymous mermaid is reincarnated as a human girl in the modern-day Japan 200 years after being dissolved into sea foam.
Gravity Falls	2012–2016	In episode 15 of season 1 "The Deep End", Mabel Pines meets Mermando, the Hispanic merman who has been trapped in the public swimming pool and needs to return to his ocean home in the Gulf of Mexico.
The Grim Adventures of Billy & Mandy	2001–2007	In season 6 episode 4 "Hey, Water You Doing?", Billy, Mandy and Grim are saved from their sacrifice by the mermaid princess Hariel (parody of Ariel) who demands to marry Billy to inherit the undersea kingdom of Gogan Land but rivals with her sister the squid-girl Uvula (parody of Ursula) for his affection. Hariel and Uvula's father is the wrestling merman king Triceps (parody of King Triton and wrestler Hulk Hogan).
H_{2}O: Just Add Water	2006–2010	Three teenage girls who, after encountering a mysterious sea cave, transform into mermaids in ten seconds whenever water touches any part of their bodies. In addition, they each have supernatural abilities over water in each of its forms: water, rain, floods, ice, snow, hail, cold, sleet, steam, mist and fog.
H_{2}O: Mermaid Adventures	2015	An animated spin-off series of H_{2}O: Just Add Water.
Hailey's On It!	2023–2024	In the first half of episode 21, "Mer-made in Oceanside", Hailey, Scott and Beta dive underwater to see if they can find a trace of a mermaid, only to discover that it is just a statue. The three eventually see the actual mermaid in the ocean.
Harold and the Purple Crayon	2001–2002	In episode 6 "I Remember Goldie", while searching for his pet goldfish who has died, Harold befriends a mermaid who helps him understand the meaning of death.
Hazedon	1972–1973	One of the main characters in this 26-episode anime series is a beautiful blonde mermaid named Shiran.
Hercules: The Legendary Journeys	1995–1999	Nautica (Angela Dotchin) is a mermaid who is the daughter of sea god Triton. She is given from her uncle Poseidon a heart so pure it warms the oceans.
The Idle Mermaid (잉여공주)	2014	A tvN drama series loosely inspired by Hans Christian Andersen's The Little Mermaid.
It's Florida, Man	2024–present	Anna Faris plays a woman in her mermaid costume.
Jake and the Never Land Pirates	2011–2016	In this Disney Junior series, a young mermaid named Marina befriends the young pirates and helps them on their adventures.
Jane the Virgin	2014–2019	In the premier episode on season 1, protagonist Jane Gloriana Villanueva (Gina Rodriguez) dresses as a mermaid while floating on a hotel pool.
K.O. Century Beast Warriors	1992–1993	Mei Mer, one of the main characters of this Japanese OVA series, switches her legs to porpoise-type mermaid tail.
Kambal Sirena	2014	A GMA Network drama series about the mermaid twins (both portrayed by Louise delos Reyes).
Kero Kero Chime	1997	The protagonists help a mermaid reach out to her prince, after gaining the ability to assume human form when dry, in three days or she will turn into sea foam.
Legend of Heaven and Earth – The Mermaid Beauty	2000	The Taiwanese fantasy series, which shows various stories and legends from Asian mythology, depicts a story similar to Hans Christian Andersen's "Little Mermaid" in which the main protagonist is the mermaid daughter of an undersea sorceress who is trapped in a conch shell for centuries until freed. While disguised as human, she explores the outside world and falls in love with one of three princely sons. The story focuses on how she manages to protect both her love and the undersea land that she comes from. The series was shown on AZN Television shortly before the network's cancellation in 2007.
The Legend of the Blue Sea (푸른 바다의 전설)	2016	A SBS drama series.
Little Charmers	2015–2017	The Charmer trio Hazel, Lavender and Posie befriend the mermaid princess Corina in the two episodes, "A Charmazing Mermaid Tale" and "Missing Mermaid Message".
Lost Girl	2010–2015	In 2014 season 4 episode 10 "Waves", three merfolk siblings Dominique (Kate Todd), Diana (Karen Cliche) and Darren Clare (Brandon Firla) are the culprits of several leg-stealing cases at a corporation. They later turn into seafoam after being sprayed by Dr. Lauren Lewis (Zoie Palmer) with tap water.
The Loud House	2016–present	In the 2025 season 8 episode 19 "Europe Road Trip: Greece is the Word", while sailing to the Parthenon, Lincoln Loud and Clydius McBridius encounter three sirens who attempt to lure them to their doom with their song.
Love Live! Sunshine!!	2016–2017	In Episode 5 of the show, an imagination scene features the main character Chika Takami and four of the other members of Aqours as mermaids.
Magi-Nation	2007–2010	In one of the episodes, Edyn turns into a mermaid complete with aquatic fish ears, webbed hands and a mermaid's tail, and dives into the depth of the water with her friends. Some other characters are mermaids and one of them, Trup'tika, is very friendly.
Mahō no Mako-chan	1970–1971	A modern re-telling of The Little Mermaid, the Japanese anime series follows Mako, the 15-year-old mermaid, as she makes a deal with the sea hag to permanently become a human so she can find Akira Shigeno, a young man she falls in love with, only to be adopted by zoologist Urashima as his granddaughter. While on the surface, Mako possesses a magical pendant called the "Life of a Mermaid", gifted from her father the Dragon King.
Mako: Island of Secrets	2013–2016	A spin-off series of H_{2}O: Just Add Water.
Maurice Sendak's Little Bear	1995–2003	Little Bear occasionally meets a mermaid with teal hair and blue tail who lives in the lake and goes with him to see places underwater.
Mermaid Magic	2024–present	This Netflix animated series follows the adventures of Merlinda, the mermaid princess of Mertropia, and her two loyal friends Sasha and Nerissa who together carry their magical tridents to protect the kingdom from Barbarossa the pirate and Tempesta the sea witch.
Mermaid Melody Pichi Pichi Pitch	2003–2004	A group of mermaid princesses who become pop singers to fight evil.
Mermaid Saga	1984–1994	A Japanese animation series in 3 to 4 volumes, depending on the country release distribution. It was based on the manga series of the same title by Rumiko Takahashi, which tells that when a person eats the flesh of a mermaid, they can gain immortality. In the United States, it has been dubbed into English except for its theme song which remains in Japanese. There are nine episodes in the American release (2003–2004): "Mermaid (Never) Smile", "The Village of Fighting Fish", "Mermaid's Forest", "Dreams End", "Mermaid's Promise", "Mermaid's Scar", "The Ash Princess", "Mermaid's Gaze" and "Mermaid's Mask".
Mermaids: The Body Found	2012	A docufiction telefilm aired on Animal Planet and Discovery Channel about scientific evidence of merfolk. The program was criticized for its hoax.
Mickey Mouse Funhouse	2021–2025	Mickey, Minnie, Donald, Daisy and Goofy enter Underwater Ocean World where they are transformed into merfolk in a few episodes, "Goldfish Goofy!", "Mermaids to the Rescue" and "The Lost Party Rings!"
Moby Dick and Mighty Mightor	1967	In episode 16 "The Shimmering Screen", Moby Dick, Tom, Tub and Scooby must pass through the shimmering screen to rescue a mermaid who has been kidnapped by the Manta Knight.
Monster Musume	2015	One of the main characters, Meroune Lorelei, is a mermaid.
Mutya	2011	A Philippine fantasy drama in ABS-CBN starring Mutya Orquia as a half-mermaid child.
My Bride Is a Mermaid	2007	A boy named Nagasumi Michishio is saved by a mermaid named Sun Seto, but it is the mermaids' law, when a human sees a mermaid's true form, the human or the mermaid has to be killed. The only way to solve this problem for him is to marry her.
My Parents are Aliens	1999–2006	In an episode "The Tail of the Knitted Map", Sophie morphs into a mermaid.
Namiuchigiwa no Muromi-san	2013	Japanese anime comedy series about a cheerful ningyo whose tail fin is torn up and warned off due to spending more time on the surface.
Night Gallery	1972	Episode 46, Season 2 called "Lindemann's Catch," with Rod Serling in his opening introductions, who also introduced The Twilight Zone series. A story about a sea captain whose desires are again awakened as he catches a mermaid on his little boat. As she has a tail from the waist down, she isn't of course quite what he wants. He seeks out a potion to change her into a complete woman. He gives her the potion and leaves her below deck. He expects that when he returns, she will be a complete woman, but she is rather now having a fish torso. The analogy of the episode demonstrates a man's innate need for a woman – even as the captain is found grasping for her feet, now a horrendous malformed creature as she attempts to jump ship.
Old Jack's Boat	2013–2015	Freema Agyeman played Pearl the Mermaid in episodes "The Pearl Earring", "Storm in a Teacup", and "The Christmas Quest".
Once Upon a Time	2011–2018	Ariel (JoAnna Garcia) debuts in season three of the ABC series. A pod of mermaids also attacks The Jolly Roger. Ursula (Merrin Dungey; Tiffany Boone in her youth) debuts in season four.
One Piece	1999–present	This anime series features many mermaids residing in Fish-Man Island, most notably Kokoro, Camie, Princess Shirahoshi, and Madam Shyarly.
Pair of Kings	2010–2013	In season 1 episode 3 "A Mermaid's Tail", five mermaids found on the beach are brought to the castle to turn into human princesses but actually seduce the twin kings Brady and Boomer. They even turn Mikayla Makoola (Kelsey Asbille) into a mermaid herself, causing her to talk in dolphin squeak, to prevent her from revealing their plan to take over the Kingdom of Kinkow. One mermaid also appeared in the season 2 episode, "Let the Clips Show".
Passions	2006	A mermaid, namely Siren (Brandi Burkhardt), is conjured from The Little Mermaid story by a young witch Endora Lenox (Nicole Cox) in an attempt to have her come between Miguel Lopez-Fitzgerald (Adrian Bellani) and Kay Bennett (Heidi Mueller) developing relationship, as Kay is already engaged to Endora's half-brother Fox Crane (Mark Wystrach). Siren falls in love with Miguel, to which she tries to place him under a curse by having sex with him, after rescuing him from drowning. But her curse is seized by Kay and Fox, leading Endora to turn her into a doll and place her into a fishtank.
Paw Patrol	2022–2023	In the season 9 sub-series "Aqua Pups", the PAW Patrol teams up with Coral the mermaid-themed Cockapoo puppy (mer-pup) to save an underwater city from Moby the mean-spirited merman-themed Portuguese Water Dog. Coral is also revealed to be the long-lost cousin of Skye.
Pet Shop of Horrors	1999	The one episode of this anime miniseries, "Delicious", involves a mermaid who resembles a woman idol singer.
Plus-Sized Elf	2024	Mero is the light-blue merrow who drinks her special medicine potion to change into a human so she can work at a fish market.
Pokémon	1997–present	Ash Ketchum's friend Misty appears as a mermaid in two episodes: "The Misty Mermaid" from Pokémon: Indigo League and "Cerulean Blues" from Pokémon Chronicles.
Polly Pocket	2018–present	In the two-part season 4 special "Mermaid Kingdom", Polly Pocket helps her mermaid friend Monroe to protect the underwater kingdom from the evil giant squid.
The Powerpuff Girls	2016–2019	In the season 2 episode "The Buttercup Job", Buttercup and Jemmica don their mermaid disguises to explore around Atlantis.
The Prince of Atlantis	1997	One of the main characters is Oya, a small mermaid resembling a ray.
Princess Gwenevere and the Jewel Riders	1995–1996	In the season 2 episode "The Jewel of the Sea", a merboy named Gilly steals the Heart Stone from Tamara and becomes a human, leaving her, Princess Gwenevere and Fallon to transform into mermaids with the Magic Pearl.
Pucca	2006–2008	The titular character appears as a mermaid in episodes "A Close Shave" and "Pucca's Fishy Tale".
ReBoot	1994–2001	In the 1995 episode "AndrAla" (episode 6 (19 of the entire series), season 2), Bob and Dot become merfolk during the underwater game.
Reborn!	2006–2010	In this anime, Bluebell, the youngest member of the Real Six Funeral Wreaths, uses her Carnage Box to transform into part-Shonisaurus, gaining a form similar to a mermaid.
Renkin 3-kyū Magical? Pokān	2006	In the anime, a mermaid princess named Lulu appears in episode 5, "A Tiring Spell Is a Trip to the Beach/Love's Spell Is a Trip to the Beach".
Rilu Rilu Fairilu	2016–2019	This anime series features a group of mermaid-fairy hybrids called Mermaid Fairilu.
Riptide	1984–1986	"Catch of the Day" (Season 2, Episode 3) involved a mermaid.
Rosario + Vampire	2008	A band of mermaids makes up the school's Swim Club, where they lure the male students in to suck their life force for survival.
Rupert	1991–1997	In one of the episodes, "Rupert's Undersea Adventure", a young blond mermaid named Marina befriends the main protagonist Rupert Bear. Another episode, "Rupert and the Mystery Isle", features a merboy named Finian.
Sabrina the Teenage Witch	1996–2003	Sabrina and a friend turn into mermaids in the episode "Wiccan of the Sea". A similar event happens in the animated telefilm Sabrina: Friends Forever.
Sailor Moon R	1993–1994	The wicked mermaid Cardian Amphibia appears in the episode "Raye's Day in the Spotlight".
Santiago of the Seas	2020–2023	This Nick Jr. animated series features Lorelai, the best friend of Santiago Montes, who uses her magical Bracelet of Pearls to transform between a girl and a mermaid whenever needed.
Serendipity the Pink Dragon	1983	Princess Laura is a mermaid who rules the deserted Pure Island and befriends a human boy, Kona, despite her hatred towards other humans as enemies.
Seriously Weird	2002	In episode 9 of season 2 "Harris and the Mermaid", Harris Pembleton (Ryan Cartwright) deals with the mermaid Muriel (Marianne Farley) to teach him how to swim. But by taking the lock of Harris' hair and with a magic kiss, Muriel transfers his human legs to her which causes him to turn into a merman.
Sgt. Frog	2004–2011	The main human male protagonist, Fuyuki Hinata, befriends a mermaid while she is in human form.
She-Ra: Princess of Power	1985–1987	Mermista, Princess of Salineas has water-based powers, including the ability to transform into a mermaid. She also appears in the animated reboot, She-Ra and the Princesses of Power (2018–2020).
Shimmer and Shine	2017	In the Season 3 episode “Mermaid Mayhem”, Shimmer, Shine and Leah transform into mermaids and Zeta is a sea witch under the ocean of Zahramay Falls.
Siren	2018–2020	
Six Gates Far Away Mon Colle Knights	2000	In one episode of the Japanese anime series, the Pearl Mermaid Princess invites the Knights over to her Water Realm castle. She creates a shield that reflects enemy attacks, even deflecting monsters themselves.
Smile Pretty Cure!/Glitter Force	2012	In episode 30 (25 in Glitter Force) in the series, the girls transform into mermaids, thanks to a Cure Decor/Glitter Charm.
The Smurfs	1983	Handy Smurf falls in love with a mermaid named Marina who has green skin and purple hair, first appeared in episode 75 "Handy's Sweetheart".
Snorks	1984–1988	In episode 9 of season 2 "The Littlest Mermaid", Serena is a very small mermaid who Dimmy Finster and Casey Kelp rescue from large winds, until Dr. Strangesnork changes her into gigantic size.
Sofia the First	2012–2018	This Disney Junior series features Merroway Cove, an underwater kingdom of merfolk including Queen Emmaline and her daughters Cora and Oona. Ariel from Disney's The Little Mermaid also makes an appearance in an episode of the series.
The Space Kidettes	1966–1967	In the 18th episode of this Hanna-Barbera animated series, Captain Skyhook and Static capture the space mermaid named Hydro Jean, along with the Space Kidettes.
SpongeBob SquarePants	2011	In the Legends of Bikini Bottom episode "Welcome to the Bikini Bottom Triangle", while searching for Mr. Krabs and stolen various items, SpongeBob and Patrick end up in the Bikini Bottom Triangle where they encounter the quintet of teenage mermaids.
Star Twinkle PreCure	2019	The Star Princess Pisces appears in the form of a mermaid. Also in Episode 27 of the series, the Cures become mermaids.
The Starry Night, The Starry Sea	2017	The Chinese drama series on Hunan TV features the love story of a merman and a young woman.
Stingray	1964	This series includes stop-motion puppetry that features a mute mermaid named Marina. However, unlike typical mermaids she has no tail; instead, she swims with two legs and displays the ability to breathe underwater. Both more well known, and popularly known, are these particular character puppets also seen in the Thunderbirds series that was produced 1965–1966.
Strawberry Shortcake	2003–2008	In the compilation special "Seaberry Beach Party", Strawberry Shortcake and her friends meet Seaberry Delight, a shy girl who they believe is a mermaid.
Super Why!	2008	The Super Readers jump into the book of The Little Mermaid, and the mermaid in the story is treated by the other people on the land.
Tale of the Nine Tailed 1938 (구미호뎐 1938)	2023	A tvN drama series features Jang Yeo-hee, a half-blood mermaid with beautiful singing voice.
Tara Duncan	2010–2011	The French animated series loosely based on the best-selling novel series features mermaids appearing in episodes "The Silent Siren", "Mer-Made", and "Boil, Bubble, Toil, Trouble".
Team Umizoomi	2010–2015	In 2011 season 2 episode 14, "The Legend of the Blue Mermaid", the titular trio follow a trail of shining scales to rescue the Blue Mermaid (voiced by American Idol winner Jordin Sparks).
Tokyo Mew Mew	2002–2003	The character Lettuce can use mew power around her legs to form a mermaid-like tail to move underwater.
Tom & Jerry Kids	1990–1993	In the season 3 episode "Tom's Mermouse Mess-Up", Tom Cat wants to sell the mermaid mouse to an aquarium, but Jerry Mouse manages to rescue her.
Troll Tales	2000	The seventh episode of this Danish-German animated show involves a blue mermaid putting a spell on Snapper by kissing him and turning him into a sea troll.
Tropical-Rouge! Pretty Cure	2021	One of the main cures, Laura/Cure La Mer, is a mermaid from Grand Ocean.
Undersea Boy Marine	1969	Marine Boy has a friend named Neptina who is a young mermaid with long flowing hair and a magic pearl she wears around her neck.
Vampire Princess Miyu	1997–1998	In episode 15 "Dream of the Mermaid", a fish shin ma named Rin-Koh appears in the form of a mermaid in a public aquarium.
The Vision of Escaflowne	1996	In episode 14, Dryden Fassa helps a mermaid named Sylphy return to her home.
Voyage to the Bottom of the Sea	1967	It has a story called "The Mermaid" (Season 3, Episode 77); at the opening of the episode one can see the mermaid unnoticed by Commander Lee Crane (David Hedison) go swimming by the S.S.R.N. Seaview submarine's monitoring window.
We Baby Bears	2022–present	In episode 4 of season 1 "The Little Mer-Bear", Grizz, Panda and Ice Bear meet Farah the mermaid, with whom they must protect the sea from the Robot Crab.
Wednesday	2022–present	Bianca Barclay (Joy Sunday) is an African mermaid who takes on full human form as the queen bee at Nevermore Academy, and therefore a bully to Wednesday Addams (Jenna Ortega).
Winx Club	2004–2019	The Italian animation series features the winged mermaids, most notably Princess Tressa and her twin brothers Prince Nereus and Prince Tritannus, and other water creatures including the water nymphs and the selkies. There are also the three mermaids appearing in the second season of spin-off series World of Winx.
Wishfart	2017–2018	The Canadian animated series features Tsuni, the easy-going mermaid who rides on a skateboard and works at a comic bookstore.
Witchy Pretty Cure!/Maho Girls PreCure!	2016–2017; 2025	Mermaids in the Magic World include a teacher named Loretta and the three students named Dorothy, Nancy and Cissy.
Wonder Pets!	2009	In one episode, the three titular class pets help a mermaid who wants to be a pirate.
Xiaolin Showdown	2003–2006	In "Screams of the Siren", Dyris was a beautiful mermaid who sought to put the world underwater. She, however, only remained beautiful when she was in the water. On dry land, she returned into her true monstrous form.
Yes! PreCure 5 GoGo!	2008	The main six girls become mermaids in Episode 40.
You're Being Summoned, Azazel	2011–2013	Undine is a mermaid-like demoness who is determined her love for Akutabe and physically transforms any human woman she's jealous of.
Zig & Sharko	2010–present	The French animation series features Marina the mermaid. Zig the hyena wants to eat her but her friend and bodyguard Sharko the shark protects her.

- Many comedy series, such as Family Guy and Robot Chicken, satire mermaids' inability to reproduce without genitalia.
- In the Japanese tokusatsu television subgenre Super Sentai (and its Americanized counterpart Power Rangers), there are a few mermaid-based elements:
  - Dengeki Sentai Changeman (1985) is the design theme for the heroes of which was mythological creatures – Sayaka Nagisa (Hiroko Nishimoto) transformed into a white-colored ranger called Change Mermaid. Some of her attacks were based on underwater movement.
  - The short film Hikari Sentai Maskman (1987) features a mermaid named Lelai, who is tricked into using her beautiful singing voice to create earthquakes that would destroy the world.
  - In Power Rangers: Lightspeed Rescue (2000), Blue Ranger Chad Lee befriends and falls in love with a mermaid named Marina (Kamera Walton). She appears in only two episodes, "Ocean Blue" and "Neptune's Daughter"; the second time forced to lure the Lightspeed Rangers into a trap. (No mermaid appeared in the previous original 1999 Japanese series, Kyuukyuu Sentai GoGo-V.)
  - Mahō Sentai Magiranger (2005) – Urara Ozu (Asami Kai) harnessed the power of the water Heavenly Saint Splagel, who is a mermaid; thus, Urara's MagiMajin form is MagiMermaid (whose legs can merge to allow her to swim underwater). However, when she upgrades halfway through the series into her Legend form, her body joins with her two older brothers and younger sister to form the Legendary Majuu MagiLion. Then in Power Rangers: Mystic Force which aired the following year, Madison Rocca (Melanie Vallejo) is the Blue Mystic Force Ranger. She draws her powers from an ancient titan who was shaped as a mermaid. Since the giant monster battle footage from PRMystic Force is taken directly from MagiRanger, Madison's giant Mystic Mermaid form mirrors that of Urara's MagiMermaid.
    - Madison's name is perhaps an intentional pun and tip of the hat since that was the name of the mermaid character played by Daryl Hannah in the 1984 film Splash.

== Video games ==
- Aquaria – Players control the mermaid-like character Naija.
- Black Desert Online – One of the playable classes in this MMORPG is Corsair who wields the Mareca, a jewel of the seas which grants her the ability to transform into a mermaid.
- Chrono Cross – Irenes is a mermaid demi-human possessing her water magic.
- Cookie Run: Kingdom – Black Pearl Cookie is a gingerbread mermaid featured in A Mermaid's Tale update.
- One of the many bosses from Cuphead is Cala Maria, a gigantic mermaid who has a lot of sea creatures fighting by her side.
- The computer First-person shooter Death in the Water II features Mermaids as eminies in the later levels of the game.
- Donkey Kong 64 – There is a blond-headed blue mermaid queen (with a silver tiara on her head) who lives in her seashell home at Gloomy Galleon and needs five pearls, so Tiny Kong is tasked to go small and retrieve the pearls for her so she can give her the Golden Banana.
- Double Dealing Character – In the fourteenth title of the Touhou Project series, a mermaid named Wakasagihime serves as the game's first boss. She has the ability to increase her strength when in water.
- Mermaids appear in the Dragon Quest video games like Dragon Quest VI: Realms of Revelation and Dragon Quest XI: Echoes of an Elusive Age.
- Endless Ocean 2: Adventures of the Deep – Although the mermaids do not appear in this game, a statue of the mermaid is one of the items that can be placed in the private reef.
- The game Ever Oasis features Esna, the water spirit based on the mermaid.
- Feeding Frenzy and Feeding Frenzy 2 – A mermaid gives starfish for bonus points after successful levels.
- Final Fantasy Dimensions II – One of the water-elemental eidolons is the mermaid whose special attack is Mermaid's Harp, which restores a maximum of 1/5 MP stat to many summoners.
- Eliza was a second boss from Gokujō Parodius, made a cameo in Sexy Parodius in Stage 2, which a Pachinko of CR Gokujo Parodius, and Otomedius in Stage 1, voiced by Hitomi Nabatame.
- The Goonies II – The climax of the game involves rescuing a mermaid.
- Harvest Moon DS – Leia the mermaid is one of the nine bachelorettes the player has to marry.
- Insaniquarium – The puzzle game published by PopCap Games features a mermaid named Meryl who appears as the hostess of the game. She also appears as a pet and her ability is that she sings, which makes the guppies drop more money.
- Ariel and other characters from Disney's The Little Mermaid appear as supporting characters in the Kingdom Hearts video game series, a crossover between various Disney franchises and Square Enix's Final Fantasy franchise. Attina and Andrina, two of Ariel's mermaid sisters, make cameos in Kingdom Hearts II during its final musical number.
- The Marai creatures from the League of Legends lore, featuring Nami.
- The Legend of Zelda: Link's Awakening – On Koholint Island, there is a mermaid named Martha who lives in a bay. She states that she has lost her necklace because of the ocean waves. After Link retrieves her necklace, Martha gives him a mermaid scale in return.
- The Legend of Zelda: Oracle of Seasons and Oracle of Ages – In Oracle of Ages, the sixth dungeon is named the Mermaid's Cave where Link finds the mermaid suit that would increase his speed in water.
- The Legend of Zelda: Phantom Hourglass – Link encounters what he at first believes is a real mermaid, but later discovers she is a Hylian girl named Joanne who enjoys dressing up as a mermaid. She is involved in several side quests.
- In Nintendo's The Legendary Starfy series, a character named simply "Mermaid" is used to save the game. When the player character, Starfy, bumps into the shell she lives in, the game saves.
- Undine from the Mana series is a summonable Mana spirit of water resembling a mermaid. There is also Flameshe from Legend of Mana, a teenage mermaid who can be found sunbathing at two locations, Madora Beach and Polpota Harbor.
- Mega Man 9 – Splash Woman's design is based on the appearance of a mermaid.
- Monster Rancher 2 – The water-elemental monsters include mermaids, Undines, and sirens.
- Muramasa: The Demon Blade – If the player successfully defeats the Sea Bonze within 60 seconds, a mermaid appears to reward them with the consumable Yata Mirror.
- In the game No Straight Roads, Sayu, the second member of the Megastars, is a mermaid and a virtual pop idol. The heroes Zuke and Mayday battle her in Akusuka, the district of Vinyl City under her control.
- The Pokémon Primarina, a Water/Fairy-type, is based on both a mermaid and a sea lion.
- Pop'n Music – The Japanese music game series published by Konami includes the mermaids, such as KIRARA and MANA.
- Princess Peach: Showtime! – One of Princess Peach's transformations is a mermaid. In this form, she uses her magical singing voice to control the fish and other sea creatures for help. In addition, there is a mermaid Sparkla she must rescue.
- Puyo Puyo – The Japanese puzzle game series from Compile (later owned by Sega) features a mermaid named Serilly (Seriri in Japan) who believes that everyone is trying to eat her, due to the belief that eating mermaid flesh will grant immortality.
  - The mobile game Puyopuyo!! Quest features five additional mermaids as part of the Tropical Merfolk series in the game.
- Return of the Obra Dinn – This mystery game incorporates many naval myths of the 18th/19th century, including the myth of mermaids.
- In the role-playing game Reverse: 1999, one of the playable characters is Vila who is a half-rusalka.
- Mermaids appear in Shantae games like Shantae and the Pirate's Curse and Shantae: Half-Genie Hero.
- The Sims – Mermaids are a new "life state", introduced from The Sims 3: Island Paradise and The Sims 4: Island Living.
- SpongeBob SquarePants: The Cosmic Shake – Madame Kassandra, the mermaid fortune-teller, is a final boss in this game.
- Ineptune, a large acid-breathing mermaid, is one of the bosses from Spyro: A Hero's Tail. There is also a friendly mermaid named Lily who mistakes Spyro for a fish.
- Tactics Ogre: The Knight of Lodis – The Ovis Mermaid clan is the original inhabitants of the island nation, most notably Aerial and Queen Chloeri.
- A Witch's Tale – Princess Aquell is transformed into a mermaid by Queen Alice and has a crush on Loue the vampire after being rescued by him. She is loosely inspired by "The Little Mermaid" story but in reverse.

== Music ==
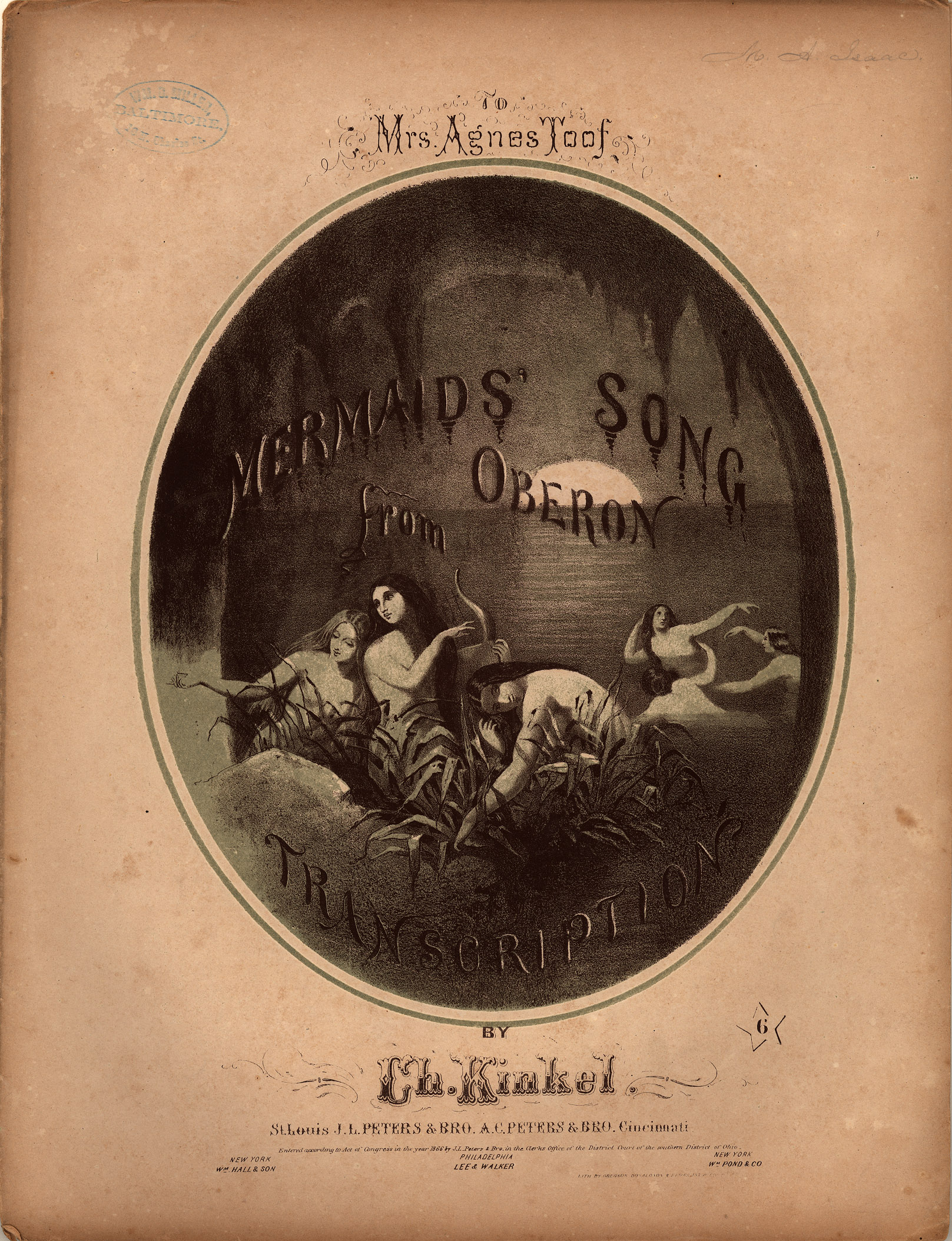
Sheet music cover for "Mermaids' Song" by Charles Kinkel, which was featured in the 1826 opera Oberon by Carl Maria von Weber

- In the 18th-century sea shanty, "The Keeper of the Eddystone Light", the singer's father is a lighthouse keeper and his mother is a mermaid.
- Alexander von Zemlinsky's symphonic poem Die Seejungfrau (The Mermaid), first performed in 1905 but then forgotten until its second performance in 1984, is based on Andersen's detailed fairy story. Zemlinsky briefly explained its plan to Arnold Schoenberg; a more detailed matching of story and music is provided by its second conductor, Peter Gülke.
- The 20th-century song "Minnie the Mermaid" has been performed by various artists, such as Bernie Cummins & His Hotel New Yorker Orchestra and Phil Harris.
- 1985 hit by French duo Les Rita Mitsouko, "Marcia Baila", includes the verse "...la sirène en mal d'amour" (A lovesick mermaid). The song's video clip includes a mermaid.
- Japanese musician Tatsuro Yamashita has a song entitled "Mermaid" in his 1986 album Pocket Music. The song is about a man encountering a mermaid during a summer day.
- In Finnish musician J. Karjalainen's song Merenneito ja minä ("Mermaid and Me"), he describes a wonderful tour in the underwater kingdom with a mermaid with whom he has fallen in love. In the song he is able to breathe under water due to the mermaid's magic medicine.
- Another Finnish song, Koskenlaskijan morsiamet ("Brides of Log Driver") is about a mermaid who falls in love with a skillful log driver. Unfortunately, he is already engaged to a human woman. When the mermaid sees her love riding the rapids with his human bride, she in a burst of jealousy raises a rock off the river bed, drowning them both. Seeing them drown and die, she immediately regrets her deed, and in the end of the song she is left weeping alone on the rock.
- Joanna Newsom's song "Colleen" tells the story of a girl from the sea who adapts to life on land, but is plagued by dreams and memories of her past. The song is told from the girl's perspective, and it is left open to interpretation whether or not she eventually returns.
- The music video for "Cherish" by Madonna includes several merman and a merman child.
- Another Madonna music video, Music had an animated Madonna turn into a mermaid while diving into a martini.
- In the music video for "Mermaid Sashimi" by Mexican singer Juan Son, a mermaid is in a restaurant ready for being cooked.
- The mermaiding performers of Weeki Wachee Springs appear in the 2005 music video for the track Low C by Supergrass.
- The Weeki Wachee Mermaids also briefly appear in the music video for the 2012 Kelly Clarkson song, "Stronger (What Doesn't Kill You)".
- The death metal virtual band Dethklok have a song called "Murmaider," about mermaid murder. In the second episode of the animated series Metalocalypse, the band state that fish had "no good metals to listens to" so they recorded The DethWater Album. "Murmaider" appeared as the first track of the band's real album, The Dethalbum.
- Sade appears as a lovestruck mermaid in the music video for her 1992 single "No Ordinary Love."
- The music video for Ricky Martin's song "She Bangs" features many mermaids.
- Among the outrageous claims made in the Lonely Island song "I'm On A Boat" is the claim by T-Pain that he has had sex with a mermaid. The video shows an African American mermaid in the background behind T-Pain as he sings this verse.
- Danish bubblegum singer Ni-Ni (Nynne Qvortrup) released an album in Japan and Denmark on February 16, 2001, called Mermaid which included the song "A Mermaid's Tale."
- Tori Amos references a mermaid in her song "Silent All These Years" and was inspired by reading Hans Christian Andersen's The Little Mermaid story to her little niece, Cody.
- Lady Gaga dressed as a mermaid named Yüyi for the music video for "You and I".
- Lana Del Rey released a song "Mermaid Motel" in 2010 on her debut album, Lana Del Ray A.K.A. Lizzy Grant.
- In 2007, Japanese pop group SMAP recorded a song titled "Mermaid", which was originally intended as a single, but ended up being released as the 7th track of their 2008 Platinum album, Super Modern Artistic Performance. The song was used for Japanese media coverage of select swimming events during the 2008 Summer Olympics.
- "FT Nesli – Mermaid" sung by Turkish singer Neslihan Evrüz 2008 in English by Burak Yeter from the album Mermaid.
- Andrew Lloyd Webber's Love Never Dies features a mermaid in the musical number "Beautiful/The Beauty Underneath".
- In 2011, Japanese group Aldious released a single, "Mermaid". The PV had one of the girls of the band as a mermaid.
- In 2011, Finnish symphonic power metal band Nightwish released Imaginaerum, which contained the song "Turn Loose the Mermaids".
- In 2012, French singer Nolwenn Leroy appeared as a mermaid on the cover of her album Ô Filles De L'Eau, and in the music video of her single "Sixième Continent."
- In 2012, American pop rock band Train released a new single titled "Mermaid" from their sixth studio album, California 37.
- The music videos for the Maroon 5 songs "What Lovers Do" (2017) with musician SZA, "Wait" (2018) with swimming team Aqualillies and "Lost" (2021) with model Behati Prinsloo as mermaids are looking on the band's frontman Adam Levine.
- The opera The Enchanted Island features mermaids in the end.
- In the music video for the 2016 Twice song, "TT", Chaeyoung is The Little Mermaid.
- The music video for the 2018 song “Only You” by Cheat Codes ft. Little Mix features an LGBT narrative with a mermaid and a lonely girl.
- The music video for "Bed" by Nicki Minaj and Ariana Grande features Nicki dressed up as a mermaid.
- The 2020 humoristic song "Aquamann" by German satirical musician "King Krümel" features refrain Singer "Zirena" as mermaid.
- In the 2021 music video, "In the Morning" by Jennifer Lopez who transform into a mermaid.

== Mascots and other ==
- Catalina, the mermaid with a golden scepter (or a trident), is an advertising mascot used for Chicken of the Sea tuna brand.
- During the summer from 1959 until 1967, Disneyland's former attraction the Submarine Voyage occasionally housed the mermaids (played by the female cast members) appearing in the lagoon.
- The two-tailed mermaid or siren with a crown is symbolized on the logo of Starbucks coffeehouse chain. The siren symbolism has been erroneously identified as a Melusine.
- In 2013, while signed to Total Nonstop Action Wrestling, female wrestler SoCal Val did a photoshoot in costume as Disney's Ariel.
- Non-binary professional swimmer Eric Milligan specializes in mermaiding performances under the alias of The Blixunami.

== See also ==
- Fiji mermaid
- A Mermaid, oil painting
- Goddess of the Sea (Visbal), sculpture
- The Little Mermaid (statue)
- Mermaid of Warsaw, national symbol of Warsaw, Poland
- Lorelei
- Sea monk
- Sirenia
