= Talk Dirty to Me (film series) =

Talk Dirty to Me is a series of fifteen pornographic movies running from 1980 until 2003. Anthony Spinelli wrote and the directed the first film. John Leslie starred as "Jack" in the first five films, after which any reference to the original films ends and Leslie's character disappears. Talk Dirty to Me Part III is notable for featuring Traci Lords in one of her earliest roles. Traci Lords has since denounced her roles with this film. The original movie also generated a spin-off called Nothing to Hide (1981), starring John Leslie and Richard Pacheco, who reprise their respective roles, "Jack" and "Lenny". Nothing to Hide was followed by two sequels, Justine (1993) and Nothing to Hide 3 (1999).

- Talk Dirty to Me (1980)
- Talk Dirty to Me: Part 2 (1982)
- Talk Dirty to Me Part III (1984)
- Talk Dirty to Me: Part 4 (1987)
- Talk Dirty to Me (Part Five) (1987)
- Talk Dirty to Me: Part Six (1991)
- Talk Dirty to Me: Part 7 (1989)
- Talk Dirty to Me: Part 8 (1991)
- Talk Dirty to Me: Part 9 (1992)
- Talk Dirty to Me: Part 10 (1996)
- Talk Dirty to Me 11 (1999)
- Talk Dirty to Me 12 (2000)
- Talk Dirty to Me 13 (2001)
- Talk Dirty to Me 14 (2002)
- Talk Dirty to Me 15 (2003)

== Awards ==
The movies won several awards, including AFAA Awards, Critics' Adult Film Awards, and the 1985 AVN Award for Best Film.
