= Insatiable (film) =

- Theatrical release poster
- Directed by: Godfrey Daniels
- Written by: Kiki Young
- Produced by: Godfrey Daniels
- Starring: Marilyn Chambers; Serena; John Leslie; Jessie St. James; Mike Ranger; David Morris; Richard Pacheco; John C. Holmes
- Cinematography: J.R. Baggs
- Edited by: Joe Diamond
- Music by: Dennis C. Nicklos; Don G. Sciarrota; Godfrey Daniels
- Distributed by: Caballero Home Video
- Release date: 1980
- Running time: 77 minutes
- Country: United States
- Language: English

Insatiable is a classic pornographic movie released in 1980, at the close of the era of "porno chic" in the US. It starred Marilyn Chambers and was directed by Stu Segall (credited as "Godfrey Daniels"). It was followed by a 1984 sequel, Insatiable II, also directed by Daniels. The series was "enormously popular", and the first film was the top-selling adult video in the U.S. from 1980 to 1982.

== Plot ==
Chambers plays the rich, happy and assertive fashion model Sandra Chase, whose sexual appetite is – per the title – insatiable. The film begins as it ends, with her masturbating. She has an old-fashioned aunt who appears in a series of flashbacks. The movie has little plot or storyline, and "only the barest minimum of real-world narrative conflict." It consists mainly of one sex scene after another with some filler sequences added to pad the runtime to feature-length movie standards. While one scene has Chambers' character overhearing her friend having sex, all the other "action" scenes features Chambers as an active participant.

In the first scene, Chambers and Serena perform cunnilingus on each other. Next she performs fellatio on a young man (played by Richard Pacheco) making deliveries who has run out of gas whom she encounters while driving her Ferrari Dino 246 GT.

In the third scene, presented as a flashback, Sandra is ravished on a snooker table by the gardener of her father's estate (played by David Morris). The incident is revealed to be Chambers' character's first sexual experience, and may be meant to explain her later sexual behaviour. The scene has been called "uncommonly brutal". Although Chambers says, "No, please stop," the movie makes it clear she is a willing participant, as she tells her friend, "I just loved being held down and made love to by him".

The fourth scene features Jessie St. James paired with John Leslie. In the fifth scene of the movie, Chambers has sex with two men (Morris and Mike Ranger) and a woman (Jessie St. James), followed immediately by anal sex with a semi-erect John Holmes. As soon as Holmes is finished, Chambers utters her last line of the movie whilst masturbating: "More, more, more." Her final moans before the final dialogue were sampled by Anthrax in their song "Starting up a Posse".

== Awards ==
Insatiable is included in the XRCO Hall of Fame. It also won "Best Classic DVD" at the 2004 AVN Awards.

== Sequel ==
The film was followed by a sequel, Insatiable II, in 1984.
