= Talk Dirty =

Talk Dirty may refer to:

- Talk Dirty (album), a 2014 album by Jason Derulo, or its title song (see below)
- "Talk Dirty" (Doja Cat song), 2019
- "Talk Dirty" (Jason Derulo song), 2013
- "Talk Dirty" (John Entwistle song), 1981
- Dirty talk, sexual foreplay using graphic descriptions in speech
- Profanity, swearing

== See also ==
- "Talk Dirty to Me", 1987 Poison song
- "Don't Talk Dirty to Me", 1988 Jermaine Stewart song
- Talk Dirty to Me Part III, 1984 porno
- Talk dirt or talking dirt, see Trash-talk
- Dirty Talk (disambiguation)
