= Dirty Talk (disambiguation) =

Dirty talk is the practice of using explicit word imagery to heighten sexual excitement.

Dirty Talk may also refer to:

- "Dirty Talk" (Klein + M.B.O. song), 1982
- "Dirty Talk" (Wynter Gordon song), 2010
- Dirty language, cursing, cussing, and/or swearing
- Dirty Talk: When Daytime Talk Shows Ruled TV, a documentary on the ABC network in the United States

== See also ==
- dirt talk or dirt talking, see Trash-talk
- Talk Dirty (disambiguation)
