= Michael Shane =

American actor (1927–1994)

Michael Shane (May 4, 1927 — February 22, 1994) was an American lawyer and actor. Born in Cleveland, Ohio, he attended Glenville High School. While earning his undergraduate and law degrees at Ohio State University, he performed as a stand-up comic at local nightclubs.

== Legal work ==
Shane became a lawyer in 1953 and was a member of the Shane, Shane & Henderson Law Firm in downtown Cleveland. Specializing in personal injury and malpractice cases, he had a reputation as a dramatic courtroom lawyer who made emotional presentations to juries. He also did legal work in show business, acted in small theatre productions and wrote songs.

== Acting ==
In 1963, director Larry Peerce was filming a small independent movie, One Potato, Two Potato in nearby Painesville, Ohio, and needed a legal office for one of the scenes. Shane offered his in exchange for a part in the film. His performance as attorney Jordan Hollis in the film earned him a positive review in The New Yorker magazine.

== Filmography ==
- One Potato, Two Potato (1964) - Jordan Hollis
- Why Would I Lie? (1980) - Bartender
- Love Child (1982) - Judge Hare
- Take These Men (1983) (TV) - the Hotel Manager ... aka Surprise, Surprise! (USA: alternative title)
- Casino (1992) (TV) - Tony Sutton (final film role)
