= Nothing to Hide (1981 film) =

- Film Poster
- Directed by: Anthony Spinelli
- Written by: Mitch Spinelli
- Produced by: Sam Norvell
- Starring: John Leslie; Richard Pacheco; Erica Boyer; Elizabeth Randolph; Richard Dove; Jack Hoffey
- Cinematography: Jack Remy
- Edited by: Terrance O'Reilly
- Music by: Richard Hieronymus
- Production company: Cal-Vista International Pictures
- Distributed by: New Select; Cal Vista Video; VCX
- Release date: 1981; (USA)
- Running time: 101 min.
- Country: United States
- Language: English
- Budget: $400,000 (Estimated)

Nothing to Hide is a 1981 American pornographic film starring John Leslie and Richard Pacheco. The film was directed by Anthony Spinelli and is a spin-off of Spinelli's Talk Dirty to Me. Nothing to Hide was followed by two sequels Justine (1993) and Nothing to Hide 3 (1999).

== Plot ==
The story revolves around two best friends, Jack and Lenny, with different personalities, who are looking for some sexual adventures.

== Cast ==
- John Leslie as Jack
- Richard Pacheco as Lenny
- Erica Boyer as Karenda
- Elizabeth Randolph as Elizabeth
- Richard Dove as Elizabeth's Husband
- Jack Hoffey as Hot Dog Stand Owner

== Reception ==
Nothing to Hide was nominated and won several awards, including six AFAA Awards in the categories of Best Picture, Best Director, Best Supporting Actress (for Holly McCall), Best Supporting Actor (for Richard Pacheco), Best Cinematography (for Jack Remy), and Best Advertising Campaign (for Jimmie Johnson). Additionally, the film got another nomination in the Best Supporting Actress category (for Tigr), but lost it. It received four nominations - Best Picture, Best Director, Best Actor (for John Leslie), and Best Screenplay, and won Best Supporting Actor (for Pacheco) in the AVN Award, and one Critics' Adult Film Awards for Best Actor (for Pacheco).
