= Jessie St. James =

American pornographic actress (born 1953)

- Born: November 30, 1953 (age 72); California, U.S.
- Other names: Jesie St. James; Jessie Chandler; Sara Jean
- Occupation: Pornographic actress
- Height: 5 ft 7 in (1.70 m)

Jessie St. James (born November 30, 1953) is an American pornographic actress.

== Career ==
She made her debut in hardcore pornographic films in 1975 with a small part in Blue Heat. She acted on and off for several years, then began working full-time in 1979. Among her earlier films were Blonde Fire, Easy and Insatiable. St. James was older than most of her contemporaries, and she played characters like housewives or schoolteachers in most of her notable roles. She is considered part of the Golden Age of Porn, and retired in 1984.

She also did photospreads in Hustler and Swank.

In the film Boogie Nights, Melora Walters' character Jessie St. Vincent was partly based on her. She has been inducted into the AVN Hall of Fame and, in 1998, was inducted into the XRCO Hall of Fame.

St. James also shares the name of another adult film star who made a series of adult films from 2003 to 2006.

== Filmography ==
- Blonde Fire (1978)
- Easy (1978)
- Blonds Have More Fun (1979)
- Fantasyworld (1979)
- Superwoman (1979)
- Sensual Fire (1979)
- Insatiable (1980)
- Talk Dirty to Me (1980)
- Charli (1981)
- Vista Valley PTA (1981)
- Center Spread Girls (1982)
