= Talk Dirty to Me (film) =

- Film poster
- Directed by: Anthony Spinelli
- Written by: Dean Rogers (Uncredited); Anthony Spinelli (Uncredited); Mitch Spinelli (Uncredited)
- Produced by: Jerry Ross
- Starring: Jesie St. James; John Leslie; Richard Pacheco; Juliet Anderson; Sharon Kane
- Cinematography: Jack Remy
- Edited by: Tim McDonald
- Production company: Four Rivers Productions
- Distributed by: Four Rivers Productions (US) (Theatrical); Caballero Control Corporation; Dreamland Entertainment; Dreamland Home Video
- Release date: November 21, 1980; (US)
- Running time: 80 min.
- Country: United States
- Language: English

Talk Dirty to Me is a 1980 pornographic film written and directed by Anthony Spinelli and starring Jesie St. James, John Leslie, Richard Pacheco, Juliet Anderson, and Sharon Kane. Spinelli plays the role of "Herbie". The film is considered one of the seminal films of the latter part of the Golden Age of Porn.

The film was followed by more than a dozen sequels into the 2000s, though beyond the first five films, relevance to the original film and Leslie's character disappears. One sequel, Talk Dirty to Me Part III, is notable for featuring an early role by Traci Lords.

== Premise ==
A self-proclaimed ladies' man brags to his somewhat dense buddy that he can seduce any woman he wants to. To prove it, he sets his sights on a beautiful blonde that they have both recently met.

== Cast ==
- Jesie St. James as Marlene
- John Leslie as Jack
- Richard Pacheco as Lenny
- Juliet Anderson as Helen
- Sharon Kane as Rose

== Reception ==
Talk Dirty to Me won several awards, including four AFAA Awards in the categories of "Best Film", "Best Actor" (for John Leslie), "Best Supporting Actor" (for Richard Pacheco) and "Best Editing" (for Tim McDonald). And four Critics' Adult Film Award (in the award inaugural year), in the categories of "Best Movie", "Best Director", "Best Actor" (for Leslie) and "Best Supporting Actor" (for Pacheco).

Roger Feelbert from Pornonomy gave the film a B rating.

== Spin-off ==
Talk Dirty to Me generated a spin-off called Nothing to Hide. The film stars John Leslie and Richard Pacheco, playing their characters Jack and Lenny; it was also directed by Spinnelli.
