= Isadora Moon =

Children's book series

- Cover of the first book in the series.
- Author: Harriet Muncaster
- Language: English
- No. of books: 22

Isadora Moon is a series of books by Harriet Muncaster for children aged 5–8. Each book is a stand-alone story about Isadora Moon, who is "half fairy, half vampire, totally unique!" Isadora's mother is Countess Cordelia Moon - a fairy. Her father is Count Bartholomew Moon - a vampire. Isadora has a baby sister, Baby Honeyblossom and Pink Rabbit that used to be her favorite stuffed toy until Isadora's mother magicked him alive.

The stories celebrate her mixed family heritage.

There are 22 books in the series; the latest was published in March 2025.

== Reception ==
The first book was published in 2016.

The series has been translated into 30 languages and has sold over 1.2 million copies globally, 40% of which in Spain. In February 2020, 300 bookshops and libraries in the UK celebrated "Isadora Moon Day".

In 2020, Kelebek Media bought rights to animate the stories and the series started airing in 2023.

== List of books ==
Isadora Moon books in order of publication
Title	Published
Isadora Moon Goes to School	September 2016
Isadora Moon Goes Camping	September 2016
Isadora Moon Has a Birthday	September 2016
Isadora Moon Goes to the Ballet	September 2016
Isadora Moon Gets in Trouble	May 2017
Isadora Moon Goes on a School Trip	September 2017
Isadora Moon Goes to the Fair	March 2018
Isadora Moon Makes Winter Magic	September 2018
Isadora Moon Has a Sleepover	March 2019
Isadora Moon Puts on a Show	September 2019
Isadora Moon Goes on Holiday	March 2020
Isadora Moon Goes to a Wedding	September 2020
Isadora Moon Meets the Tooth Fairy	March 2021
Isadora Moon and the Shooting Star	September 2021
Isadora Moon Gets the Magic Pox	March 2022
Isadora Moon Under the Sea	October 2022
Isadora Moon and the New Girl	March 2023
Isadora Moon and the Frost Festival	October 2023
Isadora Moon Helps Out	March 2024
Isadora Moon Makes a Wish	October 2024
Isadora Moon Rides a Bike	March 2025
Isadora Moon and the Pop Stars	October 2025
