= Harriet Muncaster =

Children's author and illustrator (born 1988)

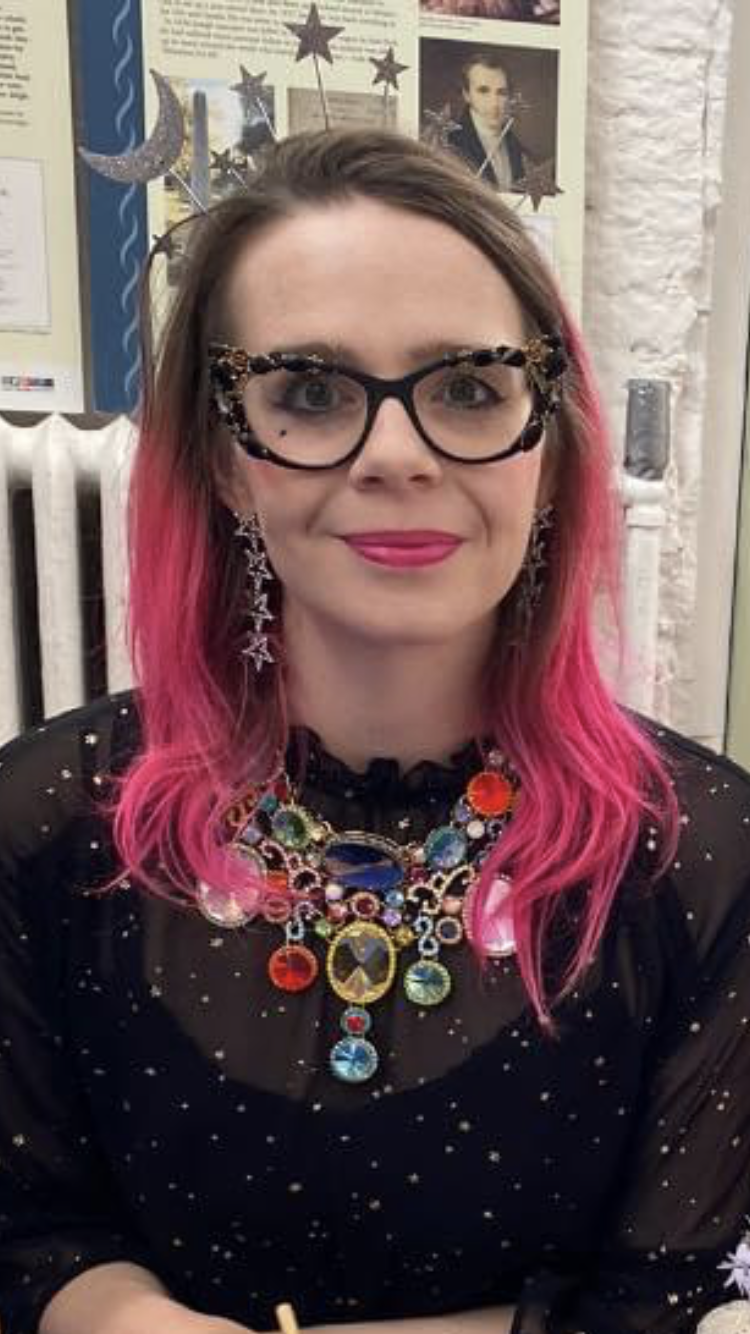
Harriet Muncaster in 2023

Harriet Muncaster (born 1988) is the writer and illustrator of the Isadora Moon series of books, which has been translated in more than 30 languages and is being turned into a 52-episode animated series for Sky Kids.

Muncaster was born in Saudi Arabia in 1988, and spent her youth in Herefordshire. She graduated in Fine Arts (Illustration) before she published her first book in 2014. I am a Witch's Cat won the 2016 Blue Hen Book Award of the Delaware Library Association in the Younger Readers category. Her main series, featuring the vampire fairy Isadora Moon, was accepted by Oxford University Press who initially offered her a four-book deal.

== Bibliography ==
- 2014-2015: I am a Witch's Cat and Happy Halloween, Witch's Cat!
- 2014: Glitterbelle: The Sparkliest Princess Ever! and Glitterbelle: Me and You (illustrations only)
- 2015: The Night Before Christmas (illustrations only)
- 2016: The Biggest Smallest Christmas Present
- Isadora Moon series:
  - Goes to School (2016)
  - Goes Camping (2016)
  - Has a Birthday (2016)
  - Goes to the Ballet (2016)
  - Gets in Trouble (2017)
  - Goes on a School Trip (2017)
  - Goes to the Fair (2018)
  - Makes Winter Magic (2018)
  - Has a Sleepover (2019)
  - Puts on a Show (2019)
  - Goes on Holiday (2020)
  - Goes to a Wedding (2021)
  - Meets the Tooth Fairy (2021)
  - And and the Shooting Star (2021)
  - Gets the Magic Pox (2022)
  - Under the Sea (2022)
  - And the New Girl (2023)
  - And the Frost Festival (2023)
  - Helps Out (2023)
  - Makes a Wish (2024)
  - Rides a Bike (2025)
  - And the Pop Stars (2025)
- Mirabelle, spinoff series from Isadora Moon
  - Gets up to Mischief (2020)
  - Breaks the Rules (2021)
  - Has a Bad Day (2021)
  - Double Trouble (2022)
  - And the Naughty Bat Kittens (2022)
  - And the Magical Mayhem (2022)
  - Takes Charge (2023)
  - Wants to Win (2023)
  - And the Haunted House (2023)
  - And the Midnight Feast (2024)
  - And the Picnic Pranks (2024)
  - And the Baby Dragons (2024)
  - In Witch City (2025)
  - And the Party Tricks (2025)
  - And the Enchanted Sea Globe (2026)
  - And the Potions Fair (2026)
- Emerald, spinoff series from Isadora Moon
  - And the Ocean Parade (2023)
  - And the Sea Sprites (2023)
  - And the Lost Treasure (2024)
  - And the Royal Runaway (2024)
  - And the Magic Shell (2025)
  - And the New Arrival (2025)
  - And the Sea Dragon (2026)
  - And the Pearly Turtles (2026)
- Victoria Stitch
  - Bad and Glittering (2020)
  - Free and Famous (2022)
  - Dark and Sparkling (2023)
- The Diary of Wiska Wildflower
  - The New school (2026)
  - The Crystal Cave (2026)
  - The Lost Draglet (2027)
