= Richard Pacheco =

American pornographic actor

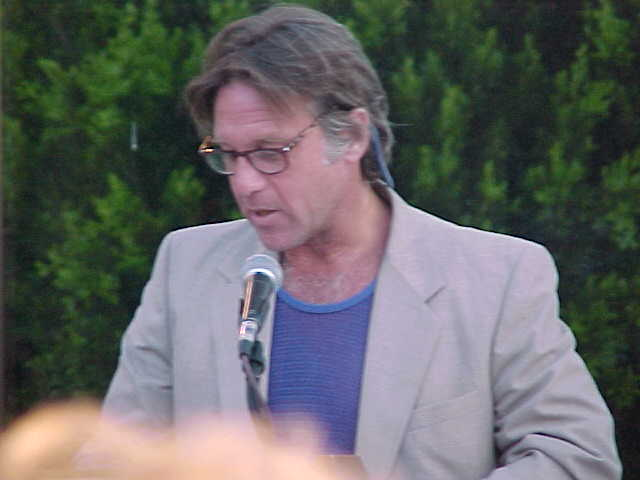
- Pacheco in 2001
- Born: Howard Marc Gordon; May 5, 1948 (age 78)
- Other name: Dewey Alexander / Mack Howard / Marc Howard / Mark Howard / Richard Pecheko / Norman Vain / McKinley Howard

Richard Pacheco (born Howard Marc Gordon; May 5, 1948) is an American former pornographic film and video actor, writer and director who retired from the X-rated business in the mid-1980s.

He appeared in more than 100 x-rated films and videos. He has won multiple adult film awards for Best Actor, Best Supporting Actor, and Best Director. He was Playgirl magazine's Man of the Year in 1979 as Howie Gordon.

== Early life ==
Howie Gordon was born into an Orthodox Jewish family and grew up in Pittsburgh, the younger of two brothers. Throughout school, he worked at his father's company, Gordon's Esso. He graduated with honors from Taylor Allderdice High School in 1966 and was the president of his class.

His first role in pornography was during his term at Antioch College, Ohio, in an amateur student production. After graduation, he quit his job, and moved to Berkeley, California, to live in a commune. In 1971, he met his wife, Carly, through the commune and they married in 1975. In the mid-1970s, Gordon was earning $5 per hour for construction work, and looking to begin a new career. He applied to the Episcopal Theological School at Harvard (to study history) and the Graduate School of Journalism at the University of California, Berkeley. He was considering studying to become a Rabbi, and according to Pacheco was accepted by the Hebrew Union College in Cincinnati, but when he learned that he would have to travel to Israel and study Aramaic for two years, he opted to appear in a porn film instead.

== Pornography career ==
In 1978, he was offered his first professional erotic film role in The Candy Stripers (released 1978) for $200 per day. Thus began his pornographic career.

He appeared in that first film under the name "McKinley Howard", and used many aliases until Anthony Spinelli's Talk Dirty to Me (1980), in which he co-starred as "Richard Pacheco". When that movie became a groundbreaking success, he kept the pseudonym for the box office value it began to accrue.

In November 1984, Pacheco stopped appearing in porn movies without condoms in reaction to his wife's concerns about the growing AIDS epidemic. This cost him most of his adult acting job offers, and became an effective forced retirement from pornographic acting. He worked in non-sex roles, and as an assistant director to John Leslie until 1986. He only directed one film himself, 1987's Careful, He May Be Watching, starring Seka, but that one won the Best Film award and won him the Best Director award from AVN Awards 1988.

His other adult film awards include Adult Film Association of America awards for Best Supporting Actor for Talk Dirty to Me (1980) and Nothing to Hide (1981), the NY Critics Adult Film 1981 awards for Best Actor for Nothing To Hide, and Best Supporting Actor for The Dancers, AVN Awards for Best Actor - Film for Irresistible, Best Supporting Actor - Film for Nothing to Hide in 1984, and Best Couples Sex Scene - Video (with Nina Hartley) and Best Supporting Actor - Video for Sensual Escape in 1989. He was inducted into the AVN Hall of Fame in January 1999, along with Bob Chinn and Annie Sprinkle. Pacheco and Sprinkle were given Lifetime Achievement Awards by the Free Speech Coalition (FSC) in the year 2000. And in 2006, Pacheco was presented with the pioneer induction into the X-Rated Critics Organization's (XRCO) Hall of Fame.

== Post-Pornography career ==
He has extensively written and spoken about pornography, including columns, articles, reviews, speaking about pornography and AIDS. In 2013 he published his biography, titled Hindsight; True Love and Mischief in the Golden Age of Porn (Bear Manor Media).

Pacheco was also in the 2012 documentary After Porn Ends, which is about life after being a porn actor. In October of 2022, he released a 1 man show audio performance of "Hindsight" which is sold exclusively on the website Bandcamp. Also at the same time, he released for streaming and digital download a comedic dance rap song titled "The Lioness And The Rabbit" with music producer Jimmy Michaels. The song is based on a story told in his 1 man show audio performance and "Hindsight" book.

== Family life ==
He told his parents about his career as he was becoming successful, with appearances in Playgirl (Man of the Month November 1978 before Man of the Year in 1979), and on the Phil Donahue Show, which he says made them more supportive. He had an open relationship with his wife initially, which became considerably less open after they had children and AIDS became a threat, but he credits his pornography career for giving him the opportunity to continue sexual encounters for a time without endangering his home life. They have three children, born in the 1980s, with whom they have been open about his pornography career.
