= Anthony Spinelli =

American film producer (1927–2000)

- Publicity Photo of Anthony Spinelli
- Born: Sam Weinstein; February 21, 1927; Cleveland, Ohio
- Died: May 29, 2000 (aged 73); Los Angeles, California
- Occupation: Film director
- Known for: Nothing to Hide (1981); Dixie Ray, Hollywood Star (1982)
- Relatives: Jack Weston (brother)

Anthony Spinelli (February 21, 1927 – May 29, 2000) was an American mainstream actor and producer, who later became a pornographic film director.

Spinelli was born Sam Weinstein, to a Jewish family. He was the brother of actor Jack Weston and the father of porn director Mitchell Spinelli.

Under his original stage name, Sam Weston, he produced the mainstream films Gun Fever (1958) and One Potato, Two Potato (1964). As an actor, he appeared on several TV shows in the 1960s, including Alfred Hitchcock Presents, Green Acres, and That Girl. After those films, he was unable to find further work in mainstream entertainment, and became an encyclopedia salesman to support his family. After seeing a pornographic film in an adult theater, he decided to try his hand in the genre, starting with Diary of a Nymph (1971).

Spinelli produced and directed scores of pornographic films, occasionally also appearing in non-sex roles, usually uncredited. From the mid-1980s, most of his work was direct to video. David Jennings, a cinematographer and director who worked with Spinelli during this phase of his career, describes him as a "master" and an "actor's director":

Spinelli knew just how much direction to add with each run-though so novice actors wouldn’t feel overwhelmed. He’d explain the significance of each line and gesture, acting them out himself for expert demonstration, and praising each positive step a cast member made. Knowing when a performer was reaching a peak, he’d always start rolling tape a rehearsal or two before the best takes.

Jennings says Spinelli focused on the "meticulous direction" of dialogue scenes, sometimes leaving sex scenes to be completed by his assistants. Nothing to Hide is one of Spinelli's most highly regarded X-rated films, ranking number two in a 2001 list of all-time greatest adult movies published by AVN (Adult Video News).

== Filmography ==
Selected credits only.

Year	Title	Role	Notes
1962	The Alfred Hitchcock Hour	Taxi Driver	Season 1 Episode 13: "Bonfire"
1964	The Patsy	Man on Phone	Uncredited
1964	One Potato, Two Potato	Johnny Hruska	Producer
1971	Sexual Therapist	Doctor	Voice, uncredited
1971	Journal of Love	Dr. Mariner	Voice, uncredited
1972	Diary of a Bed	The Bed	Voice, uncredited
1974	Youthful Sexual Madness	Narrator	Voice, uncredited
1976	Night Caller	Policeman at Door	Voice, uncredited
1977	Sex World		Director
1978	Easy	Man in Bar	Director
1979	China Sisters	Man on Tape Recorder	Voice, uncredited
1980	Talk Dirty to Me	Herbie	Director
1980	Skin on Skin	J.J.'s Father	Director
1981	Vista Valley PTA	Friend in the Bar	Director
1981	Exposed	Max Green	
1981	Nothing to Hide	Herbie	Director
1981	Between the Sheets	Bed	Voice; director
1983	Dixie Ray: Hollywood Star	Hotel Clerk	Uncredited; director
1990	Sizzle		Director

== Awards ==
- 1985 AVN Award – Best Director, Film (Dixie Ray, Hollywood Star)
- 1993 AVN Award – Best Director, Video (The Party)
- XRCO Hall of Fame inductee
- AVN Hall of Fame inductee
