= Talk Dirty to Me Part III =

Talk Dirty To Me Part III
- Directed by: Ned Morehead
- Written by: Jerry Ross
- Produced by: Jerry Ross
- Starring: John Leslie; Jamie Gillis; Ginger Lynn; Susan Hart; Tom Byron; Bunny Bleu; Marc Wallice; Rikki Blake; Peter North; Colleen Brennan (as Sharon Kelly); Amber Lynn; Traci Lords (original version); Lisa De Leeuw (reedited version)
- Edited by: Roden Gorbach
- Music by: Jack Spinoza
- Distributed by: Dreamland Home Video
- Release date: 1984
- Running time: 90 minutes
- Language: English

Talk Dirty to Me Part III is a 1984 pornographic film. It is a spoof on the mainstream film Splash and is the second sequel to the original 1980 film Talk Dirty to Me. John Leslie had the lead role, playing "Jack", a character he had played in the first two installments of the Talk Dirty to Me series. Other cast members include Amber Lynn, Peter North, Jamie Gillis and Ginger Lynn. It won Best Film at the 1985 AVN Awards.

Leslie would continue to play Jack in two more installments of the series, after which the films became less relevant to the original film. At least a dozen Talk Dirty to Me films would ultimately be produced into the early 2000s.

== Controversy ==
The original version of the film featured Traci Lords in a prominent role. After it emerged in July 1986 that Lords had been underage when she made most of her adult films, distributors were advised to pull any pre-May 1986 film featuring her. The film was later reissued as The New Talk Dirty to Me: Part III, with Lords's role recast with Lisa De Leeuw and the excised scenes re-shot on videotape and spliced into the original film.

== Scene breakdown ==
Scene 1	Rikki Blake, John Leslie
Scene 2	Traci Lords (Lisa De Leeuw in reedited version)
Scene 3	Ginger Lynn, Tom Byron
Scene 4	Amber Lynn, John Leslie
Scene 5	Bunny Bleu, Susan Hart, Jamie Gillis
Scene 6	Traci Lords (Lisa De Leeuw in reedited version), John Leslie
