= List of Mako: Island of Secrets episodes =

The following is an episode list for the Australian television show Mako: Island of Secrets (known internationally as Mako Mermaids), which first aired on Network Ten in Australia, later moving to channel Eleven. Series one premiered in Australia on 26 July 2013. The first half of the series was released simultaneously on Netflix, with the second half released on 15 September 2013. Series two premiered its first half on Netflix on 13 February 2015 and the second half on 29 May 2015. Series 3 began airing on Eleven 15 May 2016 and was released internationally on Netflix on 27 May 2016.

== Series overview ==
Series	Episodes	Originally released	
Series	Episodes	First released	Last released
1	26	26 July 2013	12 January 2014
2	26	15 February 2015	9 August 2015
3	16	15 May 2016	28 August 2016

== Episodes ==
=== Series 1 (2013–14) ===
No. overall	No. in series	Title	Directed by	Written by	Original release date	Netflix release date
1	1	"Outcasts"	Evan Clarry	Sam Carroll	26 July 2013	26 July 2013
Sirena, Lyla, and Nixie are three young mermaids from the Mako Island Pod. On the night of a full moon, they are put on patrol and tasked with keeping humans away from Mako Island. However, the girls neglect their duties and allow two boys to camp out on the island. When one of the boys, Zac, discovers a hidden cave, he accidentally falls into the Moon Pool where he is transformed into a merman with magic powers. As a result of a boy becoming a merman, one of the most feared creatures in the ocean, the mermaid pod is forced to flee Mako Island. However, the three girls are cast out of the pod as punishment for neglecting their duties and allowing Zac to become a merman. Heartbroken, the girls are determined to remove Zac's powers if they are ever to return to their pod again.
2	2	"Getting Legs"	Evan Clarry	Anthony Morris	2 August 2013	26 July 2013
The mermaids realise that they must venture onto land to find Zac and remove his powers. With the use of Sirena's Moon Ring, they are able to gain legs of their own. The girls walk onto land to look for Zac, but find that they have difficulty walking on two legs. Meanwhile, Zac manages to hide his merman secret from his father. But he has another problem – his part-time job as a lifesaver on the local beach. He must find a way to keep his secret while still doing his job. Later, Zac risks exposure when a little girl out in the ocean starts to drown and Zac dives in to rescue her. He is successful in saving the girl and also manages to protect his secret. Although impressed by his heroism, the mermaids still believe they must take his powers away or he will eventually make a mistake and expose both himself and mermaids.
3	3	"Meeting Rita"	Evan Clarry	Max Dann	9 August 2013	26 July 2013
Still trying to find a way to remove Zac's powers, the mermaids follow Zac to school. At the school, the girls accidentally cause a water fountain to erupt, forcing Zac to run away from his girlfriend, Evie, to hide his secret. The school's principal, Rita, witnesses the scene and confronts the girls. She notices Sirena's Moon Ring and confiscates it. The girls follow Rita home to try and take the ring back and discover that Rita, too, is a mermaid. After making Rita give back her moon ring, Sirena also blackmails Rita into helping them by threatening to blow her secret to the school.
4	4	"Lyla Alone"	Evan Clarry	Simon Butters	16 August 2013	26 July 2013
The girls continue to try to fit into human society, taking Rita's advice to buy clothes rather than steal them off the pier. Sirena and Nixie go to the Ocean Cafe to buy some clothes while Lyla wanders off to deal with Zac alone. At the cafe, Sirena and Nixie enlist Evie to help them pick out some clothes, but she notices the strange behaviour of the two girls. After buying clothes, they follow Evie to the shoe store, much to her annoyance, which results in her and Nixie getting kicked out. Meanwhile, Lyla tries to force Zac into merman form, believing him to be most vulnerable when he's just transformed. However, her plan backfires, leaving Lyla trapped in the café's refrigeration room as a mermaid. Sirena and Nixie must rescue Lyla before someone sees her in her mermaid form. After rescuing her, Rita allows the girls to stay with her, with her posing as their aunt.
5	5	"Blizzard"	Evan Clarry	Sam Carroll	23 August 2013	26 July 2013
A storm forces the girls to stay indoors at Rita's house. Lyla convinces Sirena to use her Moon Ring to make the rain stop so they can go outside and look for Zac. The plan backfires when they make it snow in Rita's grotto instead. Exposed to the snow, Lyla and Sirena develop a mysterious rash. Nixie and Rita must find a cure for the rash before the girls are taken to the hospital. Meanwhile, this rainy day is also the day Zac and his father go on their annual camping trip. Desperate to hide his merman secret, Zac uses his powers to fake a fever to avoid going camping.
6	6	"Dolphin Tale"	Evan Clarry	Chris Roache	30 August 2013	26 July 2013
The girls decide to befriend Zac in hope of getting him to tell them about his powers. The girls then hope to convince him that they can help him get rid of his powers. Meanwhile, David and his brother, Joe, take a ride in a new boat. Their fish finder locates an unusual sea creature under them – it is Nixie taking a swim. As Nixie tries to swim away, Joe decides to chase it down and discover what the creature is. When Nixie becomes tangled in a fishing net, she is cornered until Lyla, Sirena, and Zac (believing Nixie is a dolphin), find a way to rescue her.
7	7	"Zac's Pool Party"	Evan Clarry	Michael Joshua	6 September 2013	26 July 2013
Believing that Zac's unusual behaviour is a result of feeling lonely, Evie decides to throw Zac a surprise pool party, against both Zac and Cam's wishes. The mermaids decide to attend the party in hopes of befriending Zac. Because of his secret, Zac cannot go into the pool and isolates himself from the party. Lyla consoles him and tries to get him to tell her his secret. Evie sees the two together and mistakenly thinks the two are seeing each other. When Cam hears of this, he angrily confronts Zac. Fed up with always having to cover for Zac, Cam pushes Zac into the pool and abandons him. Zac's secret is "exposed" to the mermaids, but they promise to keep his identity safe.
8	8	"Zac's Return to Mako"	Evan Clarry	Sam Carroll	13 September 2013	26 July 2013
The first full moon since Zac was transformed into a merman has arrived and the girls believe that complete isolation from moonlight will rob Zac of his powers. The girls convince Zac to give this a try. They help Zac cover up the windows to his home and stay over that night to keep watch over him. Despite the attempt, the full moon overpowers Zac and he is exposed to moonlight, drawing him to Mako Island. The girls follow Zac to prevent him from finding the Moon Pool. On the island, Zac heads straight for the cave he went into the night he fell into the Moon Pool. Luckily, the entrance to the cave closes before he can enter it. The next day, Zac shows the girls that he now has the power to turn invisible.
9	9	"The Siren"	Evan Clarry	Simon Butters	20 September 2013	26 July 2013
Lyla convinces Sirena to use the forbidden enchantment song to enchant Zac to follow their orders so they can remove his powers. However, Sirena accidentally enchants David instead, causing him to fall in love with Nixie. Nixie keeps David at the cafe while Sirena and Lyla try to find a way to break the spell. They are able to break the enchantment and David has no memory of what happened. Meanwhile, when Evie worries about an upcoming exam, Zac uses his powers to sneak into Rita's office and find the questions on the exam to give to Evie. However, Zac soon learns a harsh lesson that powers cannot win everything.
10	10	"Zac Returns to Mako"	Evan Clarry	Chris Roache	27 September 2013	26 July 2013
Zac wants to know exactly how he became a merman, so he decides to return to Mako Island to find out the truth. Lyla suggests to Sirena and Nixie that they all go with Zac so they can learn more about how he got his powers. Since the land entrance to the Moon Pool only opens during a full moon, Lyla also suggests using Sirena's Moon Ring to open the land entrance, but Sirena and Nixie refuse. Undeterred, Lyla steals Rita's Moon Ring and goes to Mako Island with Zac herself. The two locate the land entrance and Lyla opens it with the Moon Ring. But when they enter the cave, the entrance suddenly closes, trapping the two inside. While exploring the cave further, Zac opens a portal and steps through it. He enters an underwater realm where he spots a mysterious object floating in the water.
11	11	"I Don't Believe in Mermaids"	Evan Clarry	Max Dann	4 October 2013	26 July 2013
Nixie becomes despondent when she realises their pod may never return and isolates herself from Sirena and Lyla. At the pier, she meets a young boy who refuses to go sailing with his parents. Nixie inadvertently causes the boy to run away after giving the boy advice to "look after yourself". Feeling guilty, Nixie looks for the boy herself and reveals to him that she is a mermaid to get him to want to explore the world. She also gives him Sirena's carved shell and asks him to throw it into the ocean in hopes it will get to Sirena's sister, Aquata. Meanwhile, Zac learns that the object he saw on Mako Island was a trident and does some research on it. Rita warns the girls about the trident's destructive powers.
12	12	"Close Call"	Evan Clarry	Anthony Morris	11 October 2013	26 July 2013
Zac's curiosity about the trident grows and Lyla worries about the potential danger if he retrieves the artefact. Meanwhile, the girls are running out of money so, rather than keep taking money from Rita, they decide to earn them by selling Sirena's handmade bracelets at the cafe. While out collecting shells to make the bracelets, Sirena sees Zac and manages to swim away before he can recognise her. However, Zac catches a glimpse of her tail, making him believe he may not be the only merman. After hearing from Evie and Cam that there are underwater caves in the reef surrounding Mako Island, Zac goes out to search for them, worrying the girls that he may find the underwater entrance to the Moon Pool.
13	13	"Betrayal"	Evan Clarry	Michael Joshua	18 October 2013	26 July 2013
The full moon returns and thus the trident will be within Zac's reach. Lyla is desperate to prevent Zac from getting the trident and harming, or even killing, himself. Cam warns Zac about putting too much trust in three girls whom he hardly knows but Zac refuses to listen to him. That night, Zac tries to resist the pull of the full moon, but is unsuccessful. He races to Mako Island to get the trident, with the girls in hot pursuit. Zac grabs the trident, turns around, and is shocked to see the girls in their mermaid form. Lyla tries to take the trident from Zac, believing it may harm him, but accidentally causes the trident to activate and throw everyone out of the portal. Zac has snapped out of the moon's spell, but is furious that the girls have been hiding their true identity from him. Feeling betrayed and believing that the girls are trying to take the trident for themselves, an angry Zac ends their friendship. After apologising to Cam, Zac is now even more determined to get the trident.
14	14	"Battlelines"	Grant Brown	Sam Carroll	25 October 2013	15 September 2013
Now that he knows Sirena, Lyla, and Nixie are mermaids, Zac starts to wonder why his school principal, Rita, is helping them. This brings him to suspect that she may also be a mermaid. Meanwhile, Rita begins giving the girls lessons on how to use their powers. During a teacher-parent conference concerning his grades, Zac notices Rita's great caution around water, confirming his suspicion that she is also a mermaid. With this knowledge, he decides to use it to his advantage. With her cover blown, Rita tells the girls she must leave town before Zac exposes her. The girls decide to fight back by using their powers to disrupt Zac's life and nearly expose him in front of Evie. The girls tell him that they will leave him alone if he leaves Rita alone. Rita stays and thanks the girls for their help.
15	15	"Sirena's Secret"	Grant Brown	Max Dann	1 November 2013	15 September 2013
As David and Sirena's relationship continues to grow, Nixie and Lyla are concerned that Sirena will not want to return to the sea and their home pod. Using a new ability taught by Rita, Nixie sabotages Sirena's singing audition at the cafe by manipulating her voice and humiliating her in front of everyone. Zac witnesses the whole scene and becomes angry that the girls have wrecked the audition and, in the process, destroyed a figurine he gave Evie as an anniversary gift. To get back at the girls, Zac uses the same ability to help find David a new replacement singer. But when Evie tells him that David actually wanted to sing with Sirena all along, Zac changes his mind. Meanwhile, Nixie and Lyla regret what they have done to Sirena and apologise to her. They return to the cafe where Sirena ends up singing with David after the two admit their feelings for each other and share a kiss.
16	16	"Truce"	Grant Brown	Chris Roache	8 November 2013	15 September 2013
Cam buys a new phone and tests its camera by filming Zac swimming as a merman. Later at the cafe, Cam takes some unwanted pictures of Nixie, annoying her and causing her to throw aside the phone and it gets lost somewhere in the cafe. Zac, Cam, and the mermaids are forced to put aside their differences, and work together to find the phone before someone else finds it and sees the video of Zac as a merman. In the process, Cam and Nixie grow closer together. Although they succeed in preventing anyone from seeing the video after Nixie destroys Cam's phone, Zac makes it clear that this reluctant alliance changes nothing between them.
17	17	"Moon Ring 2"	Grant Brown	Anthony Morris	15 November 2013	15 September 2013
Zac finds a seemingly ordinary ring on the ocean floor and gives it to Evie as a gift. But when Sirena sees the ring, she realises it is a Moon Ring. The girls warn Zac about the ring's great power and convince him to get it back from Evie. However, Zac still does not trust the girls and has no intention of handing the Moon Ring over to them. Zac, Evie, Cam, and Rita all attend a lunch hosted by Zac's parents. The girls crash the lunch hoping for an opportunity to recover the ring. Zac manages to get his hands on the ring first. While Zac and the girls fight for possession of the ring, they accidentally zap Rita with the ring's magic, knocking her unconscious. In the process, Lyla manages to snatch the ring from Zac. They must now get Rita to the ocean to revive her before Evie and Zac's parents realise what is going on.
18	18	"The Trident Job"	Grant Brown	Michael Joshua	22 November 2013	15 September 2013
It is the night of the full moon and Zac and Cam develop a plan to take the trident. Since the full moon happens to be on the same night as a Halloween party that Zac is attending with Evie, he also has to figure out how to slip away from the party without Evie becoming suspicious. Sirena, Lyla, and Nixie volunteer to work at the party to keep a close watch on him. When the full moon rises, Zac successfully resists its pull and is in complete control of his actions. Zac attends the party and, later that night, slips away and heads to Mako Island with the girls pursuing him. However, with Cam's help, Zac evades the girls and finally gets possession of the trident.
19	19	"Where's the On Button?"	Grant Brown	Justin Gillmer	29 November 2013	15 September 2013
Zac finally has possession of the trident, but does not know how to activate it. While at school, Zac sees Rita and realises she may know something about the trident. To get access to Rita's house, he convinces Evie and David to interview Rita at her home for the school magazine. During the interview, Evie becomes suspicious that Rita and the girls are hiding something from her and begins asking them probing questions. Zac, realising that Evie is getting too close to his and the girls' secret, abruptly ends the interview before Evie can find out more. While David photographs Rita and the girls, Zac searches the house and discovers Rita's secret grotto. Later, he sneaks into the grotto through the underwater entrance with the trident in hand to check it out properly. The girls confront Zac in the grotto and inadvertently charge the trident when it suddenly begins absorbing energy from Sirena's Moon Ring. Zac escapes with the trident and returns home to experiment with its powers.
20	20	"Nowhere to Hide"	Grant Brown	Sam Carroll	6 December 2013	15 September 2013
Zac takes the trident to school and hides it in his locker, hoping to keep it safe from the mermaids. Realising that Zac has taken the trident to school, the girls show up at school to search for it. Rita talks to Zac about the trident, telling him its more than just a weapon and that he must return it to Mako Island. However, her refusal to go into details only makes Zac more curious. Rita is forced to cut the conversation short when she unwittingly gets too close to the trident, causing it to activate on its own and drain her energy. When Zac sees the mermaids at school, he ditches class and takes the trident to a warehouse. Evie notices Zac's strange behaviour and also sees the girls searching for Zac, causing her to become more suspicious of them. Later, Cam unwittingly leads the girls to the warehouse where a fight for the trident ensues. The girls, however, prove powerless against the trident and are forced to retreat. Afterwards, Rita reveals to the girls that if the trident is taken into the Moon Pool during a full moon, it will destroy the Moon Pool, the source of all mermaids' powers.
21	21	"Aquata Returns"	Grant Brown	Anthony Morris	13 December 2013	15 September 2013
Sirena's sister, Aquata, returns to Mako Island with good and bad news. She reveals that Sirena is now allowed to return to the pod, but Lyla and Nixie are still banished. Though Sirena is reluctant to leave her two friends, they both insist that she go. Meanwhile, after seeing Aquata and believing the girls are calling reinforcements to get the trident, Zac discovers the underwater entrance to the moon pool and confronts Lyla and Nixie, demanding they tell him about the trident's connection to the moon pool. When they refuse, he threatens to take over the moon pool. The next morning, Sirena leaves with Aquata while Nixie and Lyla confront Zac at his home. Another battle ensues with the two girls finding themselves overpowered once again. However, Sirena returns just in time to knock the trident from Zac's grasp. Lyla, seizing her chance, swims off with the trident and hides it in a small opening in the rocks. Afterwards, Sirena decides to stay with Lyla and Nixie rather than return to the pod.
22	22	"Evie Times Two"	Grant Brown	Max Dann	15 December 2013	15 September 2013
When David delivers a seafood order to Rita's house, Evie, still suspicious of the girls, tags along hoping to find out more about them. Meanwhile, Rita's cat, Poseidon, becomes magically enchanted after stepping through a puddle of spilled potion. After encountering Evie, who was snooping around the house, Poseidon transforms into an exact duplicate of Evie but retains the mind and instinct of a cat. David mistakes feline Evie for the real Evie and takes her back to the cafe. Later, feline Evie goes to the beach with Carly where Cam notices her odd behaviour and calls Zac for help. While searching for Poseidon, the girls run into Zac and "Evie" at the beach and eventually realise what has happened. Lyla helps Zac keep the real Evie and Poseidon apart while Nixie and Sirena work on a way to restore Poseidon to cat form.
23	23	"Zac's Choice"	Grant Brown	Chris Roache	22 December 2013	15 September 2013
Rita begins giving the girls lessons on how to use the Moon Rings. Meanwhile, Zac is searching the reef for the trident and recruits Cam to help him find it. When Lyla goes to check on the trident, she sees Zac retrieving it from its hiding place. As Lyla tries to take the trident from Zac, a bolt of lightning jumps out from it and strikes her, knocking her unconscious. Horrified by what he's done, Zac picks up Lyla and brings her to Rita's grotto, leaving the trident for Cam to bring back to shore. Sirena, Nixie, and Rita attempt to use their Moon Rings to heal Lyla, but this fails when the rings run out of magic. Rita realises that their only hope of saving Lyla rests with using the trident to recharge the Moon Rings. Zac retrieves the trident and brings it to them despite Cam's protests. He recharges the Moon Rings, which the mermaids then use to heal Lyla. After recovering, Lyla tells Zac about the trident's ability to destroy the Moon Pool. Zac finally realises how dangerous the trident truly is and returns it to its resting place on Mako Island, ending his feud with the mermaids. However, Nixie is unsure if Zac can be trusted to let it remain there.
24	24	"Trust"	Grant Brown	Anthony Morris	29 December 2013	15 September 2013
Cam becomes angry at Zac when he learns that Zac has returned the trident to Mako Island. When Zac admits to Rita that it is not easy living a double life, she invites him to join her magic lessons alongside the girls. The girls tell Zac that he must give up his powers in order for their pod to return, which they believe is possible by having Zac in the moon pool during a full moon. When Zac expresses his reluctance to give up his powers, Sirena and Lyla place their trust in him and decide to give him time to think about it, acknowledging how significant their request is. Nixie, however, refuses to trust Zac after all the trouble he caused them, causing a rift between herself and the others. Later, Lyla spends time with Zac, teaching him about the ocean and mermaid history. Meanwhile, Cam earns Nixie's trust by keeping her secret safe after she is splashed at the cafe. Afterwards, Cam tells Nixie that he also wants Zac back to normal and offers to help her. Tension between Nixie and Lyla only grows when Lyla proposes the radical idea of having Zac join their pod. Nixie's opposition forces her to turn to Cam, the only person she can trust.
25	25	"Betrayed"	Grant Brown	Mark Shirrefs	5 January 2014	15 September 2013
The stress of living a double life nearly causes Zac to admit to Evie that he is a merman. Rita and the girls try to console Zac, telling him that being in the Moon Pool during a full moon will turn him back to normal, but he is still worried. Lyla again suggests letting Zac join their pod, but eventually agrees that returning Zac to normal is the best thing for everyone. Meanwhile, Cam lies to Nixie, telling her that Zac wants the trident back and offers to help her move it to a secure location. Cam borrows some diving gear from Evie but reluctantly agrees to let her come to Mako Island with him so she can discover the reason for Zac's odd behaviour. On the island, Nixie opens the cave using one of Rita's Moon Rings, allowing Cam and Evie to enter the underwater realm. Cam retrieves the trident but with Nixie's ring running out of magic, the portal closes with Evie trapped inside. While Cam runs off with the trident, Zac, Lyla, and Sirena arrive on the island, having discovered what Nixie and Cam are up to. Sirena reopens the portal with her Moon Ring, allowing Zac to rescue Evie. Afterwards, Zac and the girls admit the truth about their identities to Evie.
26	26	"Decision Time"	Grant Brown	Sam Carroll	12 January 2014	15 September 2013
With the full moon fast approaching, Zac prepares to give up his powers while the mermaids prepare to return to their pod. Evie is upset with Zac for keeping his secret from her for so long but agrees to keep his secret until after the full moon. However, Lyla overhears Cam lie to Evie to stop Zac from going to Mako Island that night. The girls eventually realise that Cam is planning to become a merman himself so he can rule Mako Island with the trident. In the process, Nixie finally realises her mistake in trusting Cam. The girls take Rita's Moon Rings and head to Mako to stop Cam. Meanwhile, Zac also realises what Cam is up to and heads to Mako as well. The four come together with their powers and destroy the trident, preventing Cam from executing his plan. Afterwards, Rita grants the mermaids their Moon Rings for saving the Moon Pool. Zac remains a merman, which means the pod cannot return to Mako yet. After Evie reconciles with the girls and apologises for judging them too quickly, Zac, Sirena, Lyla, and Nixie swim into the ocean together.

=== Series 2 (2015) ===
Two other members of the Mako mermaid pod set out to take away Zac's merman powers so that the pod may return home, but they do not realise his connection to Mako Island may not be accidental. Evie becomes a mermaid herself in this season. The ruins of an ancient merman temple are discovered by Zac; while only he sees the ruins at first, they can be seen by all during a full moon. Another merman arrives intent on taking Mako Island's power for himself.

Series two introduces three new characters: mermaids Ondina and Mimmi, played by Isabel Durant and Allie Bertram, and merman Erik, played by Alex Cubis. Series two was announced in February 2013, with production scheduled for the second half of 2013. Series two features 26 half-hour episodes. The first half of the series premiered on 13 February 2015 on Netflix in North America, the United Kingdom, and other territories. The second half of the series premiered on 29 May 2015.

No. overall	No. in series	Title	Directed by	Written by	Original release date	Netflix release date
27	1	"The Seventh Cycle"	Evan Clarry	Sam Carroll	15 February 2015	13 February 2015
Lyla and Nixie have left Sirena to join in a search for a new home. Out at sea, Sirena is unable to convince the mermaid council that Zac is not a threat to them. Two new mermaids, Ondina and Mimmi, head to the mainland with Sirena to try to permanently remove Zac's merman abilities. The two try to warn Zac about his impending encounter with his seventh full moon since becoming a merman but Zac insists he does not need their help. Undeterred, that night, Ondina and Mimmi lure Zac to the Moon Pool and attempt to use a powerful spell to remove his powers. Evie, fearing the mermaids may harm Zac, comes to his rescue, only to be transformed into a mermaid herself.
28	2	"Sticky Situation"	Evan Clarry	Max Dann	22 February 2015	13 February 2015
With Evie having a hard time adapting to her new life as a mermaid, Mimmi decides to use a shapeshifting spell from within Rita's grotto to turn Evie back to normal. The spell, however, does not work and, as a result, Evie is covered in a pink slime which keeps her stuck in her mermaid form. Zac hides Evie in the café's refrigeration room and then runs off to stop the spellcasting while Cam and Sirena keep Carly and the new waiter, Erik, from entering the room and seeing Evie with a tail. When Ondina and Mimmi stubbornly refuse to stop, Zac has no choice but to stop them by force. He succeeds and the two mermaids reluctantly agree to collaborate with Evie in the future.
29	3	"Discovery"	Evan Clarry	Anthony Morris	1 March 2015	13 February 2015
Ondina does not trust Zac, convinced that the next full moon will make him a threat to mermaids. When Zac suggests using Sirena's moon ring to simulate a full moon to find out, he has a vision in which he glimpses a place on Mako Island never seen before. He and the mermaids head to the island to investigate. They discover a mysterious chamber on the island from Zac's vision. When Zac experiments with a stone carving in the chamber, Ondina suddenly disappears. Meanwhile, at the café, Cam is being overprotective of Evie, much to her annoyance. Erik overhears the two talking about Mako and heads to the island to explore it. Back at the chamber, Zac is able to reverse what he did causing Ondina to reappear in the forest where she is found by Erik, who seems to have an interest in her.
30	4	"A New Tail"	Evan Clarry	Carine Chai	8 March 2015	13 February 2015
Erik's interest in Ondina continues to grow. He delivers a seafood order to Rita's house and uses this opportunity to talk to Ondina. While out for a walk with Erik, Ondina is accidentally sprayed and turns into a mermaid in front of him. Distraught and despondent over having her secret blown, she tearfully admits what had happened to Zac and Evie, who inform the others. Mimmi convinces Ondina to try to tell Erik to keep quiet about what he saw. When she does, he not only promises to keep her secret, but reveals that he is a merman and that his kind live primarily on land and travel frequently to keep their secret. The others are worried given the history of mermaids and mermen, but Ondina expresses trust and possible interest in Erik.
31	5	"Bad for Business"	Evan Clarry	Gareth Calverley	15 March 2015	13 February 2015
Trouble arises for the merpeople group when Evie's father, Doug, decides to take tourists on dive charters to Mako Island. Meanwhile, Erik and Zac bond with each other and quickly become friends. While out for a swim, the two narrowly avoids being run over by Doug's boat. While meeting at the café to discuss the situation, Ondina becomes upset at Erik when he does not seem to understand how important Mako is to her. Later, an unseen merperson destroys the divers' air compressor, putting Doug's business in jeopardy. Zac immediately accuses Ondina of damaging the air compressor, due to her overbearing nature and behavior towards him, but Ondina claims innocence. Sirena and Mimmi tell Zac that while Ondina can be frustrating, she would never damage anything and was with them the entire time. Zac eventually deduces that the true culprit is Erik. He confronts Erik and orders him to pay Evie's father back. Mimmi uses her ability to talk to whales to have them gather for tourists to enjoy. Afterwards, Zac apologises to Ondina and the two make peace, with Ondina finally accepting Zac as a friend.
32	6	"Stormy Seas"	Evan Clarry	Chris Roache	22 March 2015	13 February 2015
Erik becomes curious as to why Zac and Cam are no longer friends. While Cam is on life saving duty, Erik shows up and asks him about his estrangement with Zac. Meanwhile, Sirena begins giving Evie lessons on how to use her powers. But when Sirena mentions that Rita was once her teacher, Ondina arrogantly claims Rita's teaching methods are outdated. The two play an ancient mermaid game to see who was taught their powers better. Back at the beach, Erik is accidentally splashed and is forced to rush into the ocean. Cam goes after him and is shocked to learn that Erik is a merman. When Cam paddles back to shore without Erik, his boss thinks he's lost Erik and a search and rescue operation is launched. To get Cam out of trouble, Erik stages a fake rescue, making Cam a hero. Erik now has a new friend in Cam and Zac is not happy about it.
33	7	"Awakening"	Evan Clarry	Evan Clarry	29 March 2015	13 February 2015
It is the night of the full moon and the mermaids are worried about what effects the moon will have on Zac and Evie. Zac's plan to avoid the moon is dealt a blow when his father takes him and Cam on a camping trip to Mako Island. Erik decides to come on the trip as well so he can learn more the island. The three mermaids stay over at Evie's house that night to keep watch over her. During the full moon, Zac is drawn to the chamber he previously discovered with Erik following him. The moon also causes Mimmi to have a vision of Zac on Mako Island. She and Ondina heads to the island, leaving Sirena and Carly to look after Evie on their own. Evie ultimately catches a glimpse of the moon and falls under a moon spell, making her hyper and longing to be with Zac. She escapes to Mako with Sirena in pursuit. The two find Zac, Erik, Ondina, and Mimmi at the currently active chamber. Zac nearly attacks Evie, but he snaps out of his own moon spell when the chamber deactivates. The next morning, Erik offers to help Zac figure out the chamber's secret, but he is reluctant to accept.
34	8	"Land School"	Evan Clarry	Anthony Morris	5 April 2015	13 February 2015
Mimmi's curiosity about the human world leads her to spend a day at Zac and Evie's school. A newly enrolled Erik is obsessed with finding out more about the merman chamber on Mako Island. He asks Mimmi for more information on the chamber, insisting that he wants to help her get her home back, but Mimmi does not trust him. Things soon get out of hand when Mimmi runs afoul of the pompous science teacher who happens to detest Rita and attempts to make both of them look bad during a lab experiment. In the process, Mimmi and Rita are splashed and Zac and Evie are forced to drag them to safety. Afterwards, Evie gives Mimmi a computer so she can continue to learn more about the human world without leaving the grotto.
35	9	"Stowaway"	Evan Clarry	Margaret Wilson	12 April 2015	13 February 2015
Ondina meets with the mermaid council and convinces them to give her, Mimmi, and Sirena till the next full moon to remove Zac's powers. A young mermaid, named Neppy, follows Ondina back to the mainland, inspired by Ondina's dedication and wanting to help her save Mako. The girls disapprove of her presence, but she convinces them to give her some food before sending her back to the pod. While Ondina is away, Neppy wanders off and, after seeing Erik swimming, sets him adrift in a boat with Carly. She then witnesses Evie helping Erik with her powers. Later, Ondina tells Neppy the truth about Erik and Evie and admits she kept this from the mermaid council. As Neppy begins to question Ondina's dedication to Mako, Ondina loses her temper and hurts Neppy's feelings. Neppy runs away and is forced into hiding by a group of boys. Feeling guilty, Ondina asks Zac and Evie for their help to search for her. Zac finds Neppy and, after scaring the boys away, convinces her that he is not an enemy and takes her back to Rita's grotto. Ondina apologises to Neppy and takes her back to the pod.
36	10	"Keeping the Secret"	Evan Clarry	Chris Hawkshaw	19 April 2015	13 February 2015
Evie's father accidentally drops his watch, which was a gift from his deceased wife, into the marina. When Evie dives in to try to find it, she is spotted as a mermaid by David. Amazed by what he saw, David begins telling everyone about his mermaid, putting Zac's, Erik's, and the girl's secret at risk. However, no one believes David and he is mocked in public. Sirena believes that the time has come to tell him the truth, but the other mermaids forbid it. Undeterred, David attempts to prove mermaids exist with underwater cameras. To get David off their trails, Ondina stages a hoax by having Cam pose as a mermaid in front of the cameras, publicly humiliating David, much to Sirena's chagrin. As a result, David gives up his search and decides that it is better for the mermaid to be left alone. Sirena implies to him that she will one day tell him the truth.
37	11	"Only as Young as You Feel"	Evan Clarry	Max Dann	26 April 2015	13 February 2015
Rita meets with the new handsome director of the local marine park to discuss a new marine science elective and Rita catches his eye. Meanwhile Sirena and Mimmi create a body lotion that moisturises the applier's skin and makes them look younger. When Ondina tries some on and likes it, she adds too much jellyfish extract to the lotion when she tries to make more. As a result, she begins to act childish and spoiled. Rita tries some on too and also acts childish during a class tour at the marine park. The situation worsens when Rita goes for a swim, putting her secret in jeopardy. While Cam and Erik run interference, Zac, Evie, and Sirena must get Rita under control while Mimmi keeps an eye on Ondina. The lotion eventually wears off and Rita comes back to her senses, revealing that she helped a recently rescued and struggling dolphin.
38	12	"Supersized"	Evan Clarry	Mark Shirrefs	3 May 2015	13 February 2015
When David's brother, Joe, gives him a crayfish order for the café, David is unhappy with how small they are. To help David out, Mimmi and Sirena use their magic to enlarge the crayfish, only for Mimmi to lose her moon ring in the refrigeration room. When it does not turn up, they try searching for it in Rita's fish order, but it is not found. Mimmi then realises its in the box of crayfish that Joe took back after he accuses David of stealing his larger crayfish. Mimmi sneaks into Joe's warehouse to look for it but is caught by Joe, who interrogates her and threatens to call the police. Meanwhile, while working to install a sprinkler system with Evie and her dad, Zac suddenly has a vision where he sees through Mimmi's eyes. He rushes to her aid and gets her moon ring back. Afterwards, when Mimmi reveals she also had visions about Zac, Rita silently suspects something about Zac and Mimmi's apparent connection.
39	13	"Reunion"	Evan Clarry	Evan Clarry	10 May 2015	13 February 2015
With the full moon approaching, the mermaids plan to take Evie into the Moon Pool that night and teach her to channel the moon's influence, so she does not lose control again. Mimmi talks to Rita about the visions she's been sharing with Zac and thinks it is an ability she inherited from her mother, Nerissa, but Rita has no answers for her. Meanwhile, Cam convinces Zac to work together with Erik to unlock the merman chamber's secrets. To prevent interference from the mermaids, they have Cam cover for them. However, the girls see through Cam's deception and realise what Zac and Erik are up to. Sirena and Evie head to the Moon Pool while Ondina and Mimmi prepare to go stop Zac. They and Rita are approached by Veridia, the head of the mermaid council. She is determined to stop Zac at all costs. Rita, worried that Veridia might harm Zac, follows them. The group confronts Zac and Erik in the chamber. As Veridia prepares to attack Zac, Rita intervenes, revealing that Zac's true mother is Nerissa and that he had always been a merman. Upon hearing this, Mimmi stands against Veridia with Ondina siding with her. An angry Veridia banishes them from the pod. Meanwhile, in the Moon Pool, Sirena successfully teaches Evie to control the moon's influence. Back at Rita's grotto, the news of Zac's true identity proves too much for him to bear. Feeling utterly overwhelmed, Zac goes home and talks to his parents, who appear to break down and tearfully tell him the truth.
40	14	"A New Man"	Grant Brown	Sam Carroll	17 May 2015	29 May 2015
Zac struggles to come to terms with the revelation that he is a real merman who was placed for adoption by Mimmi's mother. He isolates himself from everyone else and refuses to accept Mimmi as his sister. When a couple of jerks show up and ridicule Zac by calling him a quitter, Zac gets enraged and begins recklessly using his powers against them. Mimmi and Evie manage to calm him down before he goes too far by reminding him that, unlike Mimmi, he has two parents who love him. Afterwards, Zac talks to his parents who tell him about how they found him and adopted him as a baby. The next day, Zac finally accepts Mimmi as his sister.
41	15	"Careful What You Wish For"	Grant Brown	Michael Joshua	24 May 2015	29 May 2015
When Cam comes into contact with water from the Moon Pool, he absorbs the water into his body and gains the ability to control water. The water also enhances Cam's swimming and earns him a shot in the school swim team trials. Zac, Evie, and Erik are worried about what effects the Moon Pool water will have on Cam and tries to convince him not to swim but Cam does not listen. Their worries are proven correct when the water soon begins to have unpredictable effects. The mermaids must figure out how to remove the Moon Pool water from Cam's body before he swims in the trials.
42	16	"First Date"	Grant Brown	Max Dann	31 May 2015	29 May 2015
Erik finds a pearl and gives it to Ondina as a gift. When Erik says he wishes he could find more to make a bracelet for her, Ondina sneaks him into Rita's grotto and uses a duplication spell to create more pearls. Poseidon is in the room, and Erik takes an immediate liking to him. Things soon get out of hand when Ondina accidentally spills some magic powder on Erik, turning him into a second Poseidon. Ondina makes things worse when she tries to reverse the spell and inadvertently creates two more Poseidons for a total of four cats. When three of the cats wander off, the girls must find them, figure out which cat is Erik, and reverse the spell before Erik permanently becomes a cat.
43	17	"The Merman Code"	Grant Brown	Sam Carroll	7 June 2015	29 May 2015
Ondina and Erik are spending increasingly more time together, causing Mimmi to feel neglected. Meanwhile, Cam studies a photo of the stone pedestal from the merman chamber and discovers that the stone carving matches a satellite photo of Mako Island. He also suspects that the symbols on the carving correspond to the outcrops on the reef surrounding the island. He shares his thoughts with Erik and the two decide to investigate the outcrops on the reef. The two find a symbol of a trident on the outcrop, but when Erik touches it, he is teleported into a realm of endless water with no way out. Cam rushes back to land and asks Zac and the three mermaids for their help to rescue Erik. While out on the island, Ondina and Mimmi get into a heated argument about their different opinions of Erik causing a rift between them. The group soon realise that they must risk activating the chamber to rescue Erik. Mimmi is able to figure out the order of the pedestal's code and Erik is set free when Zac activates the chamber. Afterwards, Ondina and Mimmi reconcile with Ondina promising never to let Erik come between their friendship.
44	18	"The Siren"	Grant Brown	Sam Carroll	14 June 2015	29 May 2015
Sirena sees a video of a mermaid enchanting a kayaker with an enchantment song and it has unexpected consequences. Sirena falls under an enchantment that causes her to care for nothing more than being with David and she begins following him obsessively. Mimmi manages to obtain the video and watches it. She realises Sirena is under the spell of a northern mermaid siren song that affects men and southern mermaids. Mimmi, being a northern mermaid, is immune to the effects of the song. That night, Sirena enchants David with the song and takes him to the Moon Pool to make him her man. Ondina and Mimmi are able to break the spell by singing a counter enchantment song. Sirena comes back to her senses and Ondina uses her moon ring to send David back to his boat with no memory of what happened to him that night.
45	19	"Surprise!"	Grant Brown	Anthony Morris	21 June 2015	29 May 2015
Zac plans a surprise party for Evie's birthday without telling her. He acts like he has forgotten it's her birthday which sends her into a depression. To cheer Evie up, Mimmi lets her try on her moon ring. When Mimmi is out of the room, the ring accidentally activates and shrinks Evie. While shrunken, Evie falls into a fish bowl that Zac intends to give to her as a gift. The girls take the fish bowl to the party unaware that Evie is inside. At the party, Evie tries unsuccessfully to get someone's attention. When Evie fails to show up and Zac learns how he unintentionally made her feel, he becomes depressed and believes she is now refusing to talk to him. As Mimmi tries to comfort him, he tells her how special Evie is to him. Evie overhears this and is greatly touched. She also manages to finally get Zac's attention. The mermaids restore Evie to normal size and she expresses her gratitude to Zac for his beautiful words. The gang then returns to the party to enjoy themselves.
46	20	"The Job"	Grant Brown	Sam Carroll	28 June 2015	29 May 2015
In need of money, Mimmi decides to take on a job at the marine park. She meets a young man named Chris who seems overly strict and rubs her the wrong way at first. She learns, however, that he has a passion for dolphins and dreams of working with them in the dolphin training program. Chris's attempts to gain approval for the program fall on deaf ears so Mimmi decides to help him out. She has him close his eyes while she gets in the water and successfully helps him to connect with a dolphin. He and Mimmi then share a kiss. When Chris shows what he can do to the marine park's director, he is accepted into the dolphin training program. Although Mimmi is disappointed to learn that Chris will be away in America for 3 months, she is happy that she helped him achieve his dream and Chris expresses his gratitude to her before leaving. Meanwhile Ondina gets hired at the café as a back-up waitress, but her poor work ethic ultimately gets her fired.
47	21	"New Orders"	Grant Brown	Michael Joshua	5 July 2015	29 May 2015
The next full moon is approaching and Zac will have an opportunity to learn about what the merman chamber does. Ondina is worried about what might happen if Zac activates it but Mimmi refuses to go against her brother's wishes and intends to let him activate the chamber. At the Moon Pool, Ondina runs into Veridia who has come up with a plan to destroy the chamber by having Ondina use her power to turn the chamber's power against itself when Zac activates it. Ondina agrees under the condition that she, Mimmi, and Sirena be accepted back into the pod and Veridia agrees. Later, however, Zac changes his mind about activating the chamber when Rita informs him that he and Mimmi are descended from the merman who built the chamber and refused to activate it after falling in love with a mermaid. Ondina meets with Zac and manipulates him into continuing with his original plan to learn the chamber's purpose. Zac agrees under the condition that he goes alone. That night, Zac sneaks away to the merman chamber with Ondina following him. When Mimmi learns that Zac had lied through a vision, she and the others rush to the chamber. When Zac enters the code into the chamber, it seemingly recreates the trident. As Zac reaches for it, Ondina stops him and prepares to carry out Veridia's orders. The others intervene, warning Ondina that destroying the chamber may destroy the island itself. Zac reaches for the trident again but it turns out to be a hologram that signifies the trident is necessary to start the chamber. With the trident already destroyed, the chamber's threat is seemingly over. The next day, Veridia lifts the girl's banishment and informs them that the pod will return by the next full moon.
48	22	"The Last Dance"	Grant Brown	Carine Chai	12 July 2015	29 May 2015
With her banishment lifted, Ondina is eager to return to the pod. Her excitement is short-lived, however, when Erik brings up the possibility that returning to the pod will mean she may never be able to see him again. Ondina becomes depressed, not wanting to have to choose between Erik or the pod. Erik decides to throw her a party at the café to cheer her up. When a pendant of Rita's goes missing, Mimmi accuses Erik of stealing it to make money for the party. Erik does not deny it, but is hurt by the accusation. When the pendant turns up and Mimmi learns that Erik had actually gotten the money using his own secret stash of treasure he collected out at sea, she apologises to him. Meanwhile, Cam and Carly have trouble admitting their true feelings for each other. When the party ends, Cam musters up the courage and admits his true feelings for Carly. They share a kiss and become a couple. Afterwards, Ondina concludes that if Mimmi could not trust Erik, neither will Veridia or the pod. She then makes the difficult decision to leave the pod and stay on land to be with Erik.
49	23	"Stay or Go"	Grant Brown	Max Dann	19 July 2015	29 May 2015
Mimmi is heartbroken by Ondina's decision to leave the pod and refuses to speak to her. While working at the marine park, a young girl steals a toy dolphin and Mimmi pursues her. Ondina comes to the park to talk to Mimmi about her decision to stay on land. However, both of them end up getting splashed by the dolphins. The girls transform and are forced to hide, but not without the girl seeing them. The girl draws in a huge crowd to show everyone the mermaids. Sirena is able to get them out of trouble by telling the crowd that Mimmi and Ondina are actresses in mermaid costumes for an attraction. She then gets Mimmi and Ondina to reconcile, and the girl gets punished for stealing the toy dolphin. Meanwhile, Cam and Carly have their first date fishing near Mako Island. Their boat's anchor gets stuck, forcing them to swim to the island and await rescue. Much to Cam's humiliation, any attempt he makes to impress Carly, she does better. Zac arrives and helps Cam by freeing the anchor and letting him take the credit to impress her. Back at Rita's grotto, the girls decide that they must find a way to get the pod to see that humans and mermen can be trusted so they can live in both worlds.
50	24	"The Truth About Evie"	Grant Brown	Sam Carroll	26 July 2015	29 May 2015
David leaves to attend a business seminar and leaves Carly in charge of the cafe. When Erik is late for work again, Carly becomes fed up with his frequent tardiness and fires him. Meanwhile, Evie catches a cold and it causes her to lose control of her powers. Whenever she sneezes she lights things on fire. Carly witnesses one of the sneezes and becomes suspicious that Evie is hiding something from her. The mermaids try to come up with a cure, but it merely changes the effect of the sneeze from fire to ice. Eventually, all three mermaids also catch the cold. At the café, Evie sneezes and freezes Cam in front of Carly. Zac and the girls then flee to Evie's house. When Carly later shows up, demanding answers, she finally discovers Zac's and the girls' secret. Carly is upset at first, but she soon forgives Evie and agrees to keep the group's secret.
51	25	"The Trident Stone"	Grant Brown	Sam Carroll	2 August 2015	29 May 2015
Erik learns from Cam that while the trident was broken, the stone that powers it was not. Erik concludes that it is the stone rather than the trident that can activate the merman chamber. Sirena reveals to Zac, Ondina, and Mimmi that she has kept the stone hidden at Rita's grotto the entire time. Although the stone has seemingly lost its power, it becomes active again when Zac touches it due to his strong connection to Mako Island. Rita realises that the chamber's purpose is to drain the magic from the moon pool, which in turn will basically destroy every mermaid. Zac takes the stone and goes to hide it in a safe place. When Erik realises Zac has the stone, he confronts him. Erik believes there has to be more to the chamber's purpose besides destroying mermaids and becomes angry when Zac refuses to activate the chamber. He demands custody of the stone, but Zac refuses to hand it over. Realising the stone is not safe with him, Zac turns to Cam and asks him to hide it. Erik tries to bribe Cam into giving him the stone, but Cam refuses to lose his friendship with Zac twice and, instead, gives it back to the mermaids. Erik later finds the stone in Rita's grotto and is confronted by Mimmi and Zac. Erik uses the stone to drain Zac's powers. With the stone now in his possession and Zac's powers inside it, Erik will be able to activate the chamber.
52	26	"The Chosen One"	Grant Brown	Mark Shirrefs	9 August 2015	29 May 2015
With the full moon approaching, Ondina tries to warn Erik not to activate the merman chamber, but Erik refuses to listen even to her. A now powerless Zac has seemingly given up despite encouragement from Mimmi, Evie, and Cam. Zac later musters up the courage and follows Erik to the chamber to try and stop him. The girls also race to the chamber to stop Erik. Zac fights with Erik for the stone but he shakes him off and finally activates the chamber. The girls attempt to destroy the stone with their moon rings, but it merely absorbs their power. The chamber drains the magic from the moon pool and slowly begins to kill the mermaids except Evie. Horrified by what he's done, Erik tries to deactivate the chamber but is unsuccessful. Evie arrives and helps an injured Zac to his feet. He successfully deactivates the chamber and saves the mermaids but seemingly dies in the process. Desperate to save her brother, Mimmi grabs the stone and places it over Zac's heart. The stone restores Zac's power and revives him. The stone then crumbles, ending the chamber's threat to mermaids for good. The next day, Erik tries to apologise to Ondina, but she refuses to forgive him and breaks up with him and he leaves the Gold Coast in shame. Sirena reveals she's a mermaid to David. Veridia meets the group at Rita's grotto and praises Zac for his heroic actions. She makes him and Evie honorary members of the pod and gives Evie her own moon ring. The group joyfully swims out to greet the pod as they return to Mako at last.

=== Series 3 (2016) ===
When a Chinese mermaid named Weilan accidentally releases a water dragon from an ancient relic, she flees to Mako Island with the creature in pursuit. Mermaids Ondina and Mimmi must defend Mako Island and the Gold Coast from destruction. Series three debuted in Australia on 15 May 2016 on Eleven and was released on Netflix on 27 May 2016. It features 16 half-hour episodes.

Cariba Heine guest stars in the final two episodes, reprising her role from H_{2}O: Just Add Water as Rikki Chadwick.

No. overall	No. in series	Title	Directed by	Written by	Original release date	Netflix release date
53	1	"East Meets West" "A Visit from the East"	Evan Clarry	Sam Carroll	15 May 2016	27 May 2016
Ondina, Mimmi, and Evie are enjoying life on the Gold Coast without Sirena, who has gone on a vacation with her sister, Aquata, in Hawaii. Ondina is given the task of teaching a class of younger mermaids in mermaid school. When one of her students wanders off, Ondina goes looking for her and witnesses an unidentified mermaid freeing the student from a fishing net. The mermaid later reveals herself to be Weilan, an Eastern mermaid from China. Due to Weilan's sassy attitude, Ondina immediately dislikes her while Mimmi shows Weilan around and introduces her to their friends. Later that night, the mermaids encounter a terrifying water dragon. They escape when Joe and David unwittingly distract the dragon with their boat. Weilan explains that the dragon's sole purpose is to destroy all mermaids.
54	2	"Seeing Is Believing"	Evan Clarry	Mark Shirrefs	22 May 2016	27 May 2016
Tension between Ondina and Weilan grows when Weilan makes a mess of Rita's grotto and Ondina blames her for leading the dragon to Mako Island and endangering the pod. At the marine park, Mimmi is reunited with Chris, who has returned from the dolphin training program in America. He introduces Mimmi to Karl, whom he met in America. Meanwhile, Joe informs the marine park of the dragon he saw last night. The park director sends Chris and Karl out to Mako to hunt for the dragon, putting the mermaids' secret in jeopardy. Chris finds the Moon Pool and Ondina barely manages to avoid being seen. The mermaids eventually use their powers to convince Chris and Karl that the dragon Joe saw was a waterspout. Afterwards, Ondina and Weilan make peace with each other.
55	3	"Recipe for Success"	Evan Clarry	Max Dann	29 May 2016	27 May 2016
Weilan enrolls at the local high school and becomes Zac's study partner after he fails an exam. Desperate to pass his next exam, Zac begs Weilan to use a knowledge transference spell to transfer her knowledge of biology to Zac's mind. The spell does not seem to work at first but when Weilan and Zac wake up the next morning, they are horrified to find that they have swapped hair with each other. While taking the exam, the knowledge transference takes effect and Zac easily passes the exam, making the teacher suspect that he may be cheating. Rita decides that the best way to settle this is to have Zac retake the exam. Things soon get worse when Weilan and Zac swap voices and slowly begin swapping the rest of their bodies with each other. Mimmi and Ondina eventually reverse the spell and return Weilan and Zac to normal. Zac retakes the exam and passes it on his own.
56	4	"Mopping Up"	Evan Clarry	Anthony Morris	5 June 2016	27 May 2016
Ondina begins giving Evie lessons on how to use her moon ring to telekinetically manipulate objects. Later, at her home, Evie uses her moon ring to manipulate a mop to clean the floor for her. However, things get out of control when the mop develops a mind of its own and runs wild throughout the house. Evie, Zac, and the three mermaids must stop the animated mop before Evie's father comes home. Meanwhile, because Joe owns a share of the café, he announces his decision to close the café to save money, despite protests from David, Zac, and Cam. To save the café, Cam uses his savings to buy Joe's share of the café, making him the co-owner of the café along with David.
57	5	"The Puzzle Box"	Evan Clarry	Phil Enchelmaier	12 June 2016	27 May 2016
Weilan suggests using a Chinese puzzle box and enchanting it with a containment and shrinking spell to trap the water dragon. She and Ondina search for one at a flea market and eventually are able to purchase one from an antique dealer named Shen. The enchantment does not seem to work at first but later that night, the box activates and sucks in Poseidon. When Weilan takes the box to school, their science teacher gets too close to it and is also sucked in. Weilan later opens the box and frees both Poseidon and the teacher, who has no memory of being trapped in the box. The girls decide the box is too dangerous to use and destroys it. Meanwhile, Carly suggests that she and Cam take dance lessons which Cam reluctantly agrees to. However, Cam inadvertently hurts Carly's feelings when he calls her idea "stupid" and she overhears it. To save their relationship, Cam takes dance lessons from Zac and asks Carly to dance with him at the café which she happily agrees to.
58	6	"New Beginnings"	Evan Clarry	Sam Carroll	19 June 2016	27 May 2016
At the marine park, a team of rescuers, including Chris, goes out to rescue a pod of stranded dolphins, leaving Karl and Mimmi to work the various jobs around the park. Mimmi soon becomes worried about a seemingly sick dolphin. After communicating with it, she learns that the dolphin is in distress because she is in labour and wants help from another dolphin. After convincing Karl to help, the baby dolphin is successfully born. Chris grows more interested in Mimmi when Karl tells him about her knowledge of dolphins. Meanwhile, Evie pushes Ondina to teach her some more advanced spells with the moon ring. When Evie tries using the spell, she accidentally suspends Ondina and Weilan in midair. Evie tries but fails to get them back on the ground. She loses her confidence, panics, and runs off to find Mimmi, leaving Ondina and Weilan floating in the air. The two are forced to set aside their differences and work together to break the spell and get back on the ground.
59	7	"Turning the Tide"	Evan Clarry	Evan Clarry	26 June 2016	27 May 2016
As the mermaids prepare for their next encounter with the dragon, Weilan demonstrates a powerful Eastern mermaid spell called "Turn the Tide" which reflects any magic aimed at the spell-caster back to where it came from. Zac and Ondina are both determined to learn it and struggle in their efforts. Meanwhile, Mimmi volunteers herself and Ondina to cover for David while he works on a group science project. The two run into trouble when Joe shows up in the middle of Ondina's efforts to figure out Weilan's complicated spell on her own.
60	8	"The Way of the Dragon"	Evan Clarry	Evan Clarry	3 July 2016	27 May 2016
On the night of the full moon, the pod is determined to defeat the water dragon. Veridia tasks Ondina and Mimmi with watching over the younger mermaids but the two of them, unhappy with being left out of the action, decided to disobey Veridia's orders and join the fight. Zac and Weilan have a plan to have Zac lure the dragon into the Moon Pool and use "Turn the Tide" to counter its fire breath. To get the pod out of the way, Weilan lies to Veridia, telling her that to catch the dragon off when the moon rises, they should hide in the west side of Mako. Knowing Evie will try to stop him, Zac enlists Cam to keep her occupied, but Evie does the same with Carly, as she has decided to join the fight. Later, Evie notices Zac and Weilan together and realises they are up to something. She forces Weilan to tells her their plan and she swims off after Zac. The dragon appears and chases Zac into the Moon Pool where he finds Evie. Mimmi has a vision of Zac and Ondina realises the deception. Zac and Evie face off against the dragon, but Zac fails to destroy it and Evie is struck by the dragon's fire breath, causing her to lose both her tail. Instead of finishing Zac off, the dragon merely leaves after sniffing him. Ondina furiously berates Weilan and she runs off in utter shame. Heartbroken, Evie goes home after declining Zac's offer to walk her.
61	9	"Reversal of Fortune"	Evan Clarry	Evan Clarry	10 July 2016	27 May 2016
Weilan overhears Ondina blaming her for Evie losing her tail and she runs off deeply hurt. She later runs into Shen and tearfully admits to him what had happened and that she plans to leave the Gold Coast for good. Shen attempts to comfort her and explain that running away from her problems will not fix them. Weilan decides to leave anyway in the hopes that the dragon will follow her like it did before. Meanwhile, Ondina and Mimmi try using a spell to make Evie a mermaid again. However, the spell backfires, leaving Ondina unable to get her legs even when she's dry. As Weilan prepares to leave, Ondina stops her and apologizes for being too harsh on her and also convinces her to stay. After Weilan accepts Ondina's apology, the two reconcile and Weilan is able to restore Ondina to normal with some Eastern magic. Evie eventually returns her moon ring to Rita and decides that, although she will miss being a mermaid, she should reap the benefits of being an ordinary girl again. She then goes diving with her dad, something she has been unable to do since becoming a mermaid.
62	10	"Wishful Thinking"	John Hartley	Phil Enchelmaier	17 July 2016	27 May 2016
Zac finds a beautiful seashell while swimming out on the reef. Later, when the mermaids visit Zac and see a picture of him from when he was younger, a nostalgic Zac casually wishes that they could have seen him from those days and the seashell sends the girls five years back in time. When young Zac asks who they were, Weilan tells him that they're aliens. Confused, the girls leave and meet a younger Rita who does not recognise them. After realising what happened, they return to Zac's place for the shell. Meanwhile, in the present, Zac finds himself in a world where Cam and Evie are a couple, Rita has moved away, and everyone believes him to be an alien obsessed nerd. In the past, the girls find the shell, but an impatient Ondina hurts Zac's feelings. After convincing Rita that they are from the future, she explains them the shell is a wishing shell and only the person who found it can use it. They find young Zac at a birthday party for Evie and ask him for his help after Ondina apologises, but he feels humiliated when the girls refuse to prove to his friends that they're aliens. Mimmi apologises to young Zac and saves his reputation with a brief magic show with her powers. Young Zac then uses the shell to restore the present to the way it was.
63	11	"Lost and Found"	John Hartley	Sam Carroll	24 July 2016	27 May 2016
Ondina and Weilan take a class of young mermaids onto Mako Island to teach them how to walk on two legs. One of the girls, Amaris, quickly gets the hang of walking and wanders off on her own. When Chris and Karl are sent to observe some sea turtles on Mako Island, Mimmi heads there to warn the mermaids and Weilan sends the other young mermaids to safety. Amaris soon runs into Chris and Karl and runs away frightened. As Chris, Karl, and the mermaids search for her together, Amaris continues to hide, fearful of interacting with land people. She then falls into the land entrance to the Moon Pool and is able to swim back to the beach where Ondina finally finds her. Amaris then apologises and promises to never wonder off on her own again. Meanwhile, Cam suggests modifying the recipe of the cafe's most popular burger to save money, but David is against the idea. To resolve the matter, they ask Zac to act as their taste tester for the burgers. Ultimately Zac declares David's burger the winner.
64	12	"Trust Issues"	John Hartley	Tony Cavanaugh	31 July 2016	27 May 2016
When Chris finally asks Mimmi out on a date, she happily accepts but Ondina is completely against the idea. As Mimmi enjoys a day at the beach with Chris, Ondina follows them despite Weilan's insistence to back off. As Mimmi and Chris are about to kiss, Ondina creates a rainstorm forcing Mimmi to flee. Later, Ondina admits to Weilan that she ruined Mimmi's date because she wanted to spare Mimi the heartbreak she suffered when her own relationship with Erik ended. Weilan convinces Ondina that Mimmi needs to make her own decisions. Ondina admits what she did and apologises, but Mimmi decides to not pursue a relationship with Chris out of guilt for lying to him. Meanwhile, Cam attempts to change the image of the cafe in order to attract more sophisticated customers, but no one shows up to the formal party he arranges. Carly convinces Cam that the cafe is fine the way it is and she draws in a crowd after making some phone calls. Weilan and Ondina get Chris and Mimmi to come to the party, and they finally admit their true feelings for each other and share a kiss.
65	13	"Letting Go"	John Hartley	Jo Watson	7 August 2016	27 May 2016
Mimmi and Zac receive a vision of a mermaid whom Mimmi believes is their long-lost mother, Nerissa. Weilan reveals that Nerissa disappeared after facing a rebel mermaid named Aurora who threatened the Northern and Eastern pods. Mimmi's belief that Nerissa is alive is not shared by the others. Later, while watching Chris' football game with Ondina, Weilan, and Zac, Mimmi's moon ring glows and she is convinced that Nerissa is trying to reach out to her. Mimmi leaves the game to contact Nerissa, despite Zac urging her to let Nerissa go. Out at sea, Mimmi uses her moon ring to reach Nerissa, but the ring summons the water dragon instead. The dragon chases her into the canal but spares her like it did to Zac before. Afterwards, Mimmi decides that she must let Nerissa go and holds a memorial service in her honour with Zac. Meanwhile, Carly becomes frustrated with Cam's double role as boyfriend and boss. When her attempt to find a balance fails, Cam decides he would rather just be Carly's boyfriend and sells his half of the cafe to David. Later, Mimmi apologises to Chris for bailing on him, but he starts to have some doubts about their relationship.
66	14	"Age Before Beauty"	John Hartley	Chris Anastassiades	14 August 2016	27 May 2016
As Ondina continues to teach her mermaid class, she grows frustrated by her students' lack of interest. To liven the class up, Mimmi suggests showing them a spell that accelerates the growth of any living thing. Later, Weilan mistakes the growth spell ingredients for tea and offers some to Rita as she prepares for a job review to keep her position as principal, causing her to rapidly age into an old lady. After Rita tells them the ingredients for a reversal spell, Weilan and Ondina go to gather them while Mimmi keeps an eye on Rita. Rita reflects on her past and realises that, although she had a fulfilling life on land, she misses her old life in the sea. Rita then realises that she forgot one final ingredient for the reversal spell but has trouble remembering what it is. Meanwhile, the school board begins interviewing the science teacher for the principal job. Zac and Evie distracts the school board to buy Rita more time. Rita eventually remembers the final ingredient and the girls are able to complete the reversal spell to restore Rita to her normal age. Although Rita makes it to her review, she realises how much she misses the sea and, to everyone's astonishment, quits her job as principal. Later, Veridia offers Rita a job in mermaid school and Rita takes Ondina's place as the teacher of the mermaid class.
67	15	"The Legend of Jiao Long"	John Hartley	Sam Carroll	21 August 2016	27 May 2016
The mermaids, along with Karl and Chris, attend a book signing at an exhibition for Secrets of the Deep, whose author had gathered lots of artefacts from incredible depths of the ocean. The author of the book turns out to be Rikki Chadwick. A mysterious bracelet at the exhibition is noted to be associated with the Jiao Long Dragon. The mermaids go to Shen's antique store where Weilan examines the painting of The Legend of Jiao Long. The painting reveals a mermaid using the same bracelet from the exhibition on the dragon in the legend. The girls suspect that Rikki is a mermaid, whose recovered bracelet can defeat the water dragon. The girls inform her of their real identities and of the dragon, but Rikki turns the girls away, unwilling to give up the priceless artefact she struggled so hard to obtain. Meanwhile, Chris becomes suspicious of Mimmi's behaviour and begins to doubt that Mimmi really likes him. In an attempt to get some answers, Chris talks to Zac who insists that Mimmi has nothing to hide and that she really likes him but Chris is left unsatisfied. Later, the mermaids enlist Zac to help them steal the bracelet. The heist ultimately fails and the girls are forced to retreat when the police arrive. Afterwards, Chris confronts Mimmi on her secrecy but she still refuses to tell him the truth. Fed up with her always running out on him and her lack of honesty, Chris breaks up with her. Special guest star: Cariba Heine as Rikki Chadwick
68	16	"Homecoming"	John Hartley	Mark Shirrefs	28 August 2016	27 May 2016
In the Series Finale, the Mako pod prepares to launch its final attack on the Water Dragon. Mimmi and Zac experience further visions of their mother, revealing new information that could lead to a long-awaited reunion. Meanwhile, Ondina and Weilan appeal to Rikki during an emotional return to Mako Island, hoping to gain her support in the upcoming confrontation with the Dragon. Special guest star: Cariba Heine as Rikki Chadwick
