= Phoebe Tonkin =

Australian actress (born 1989)

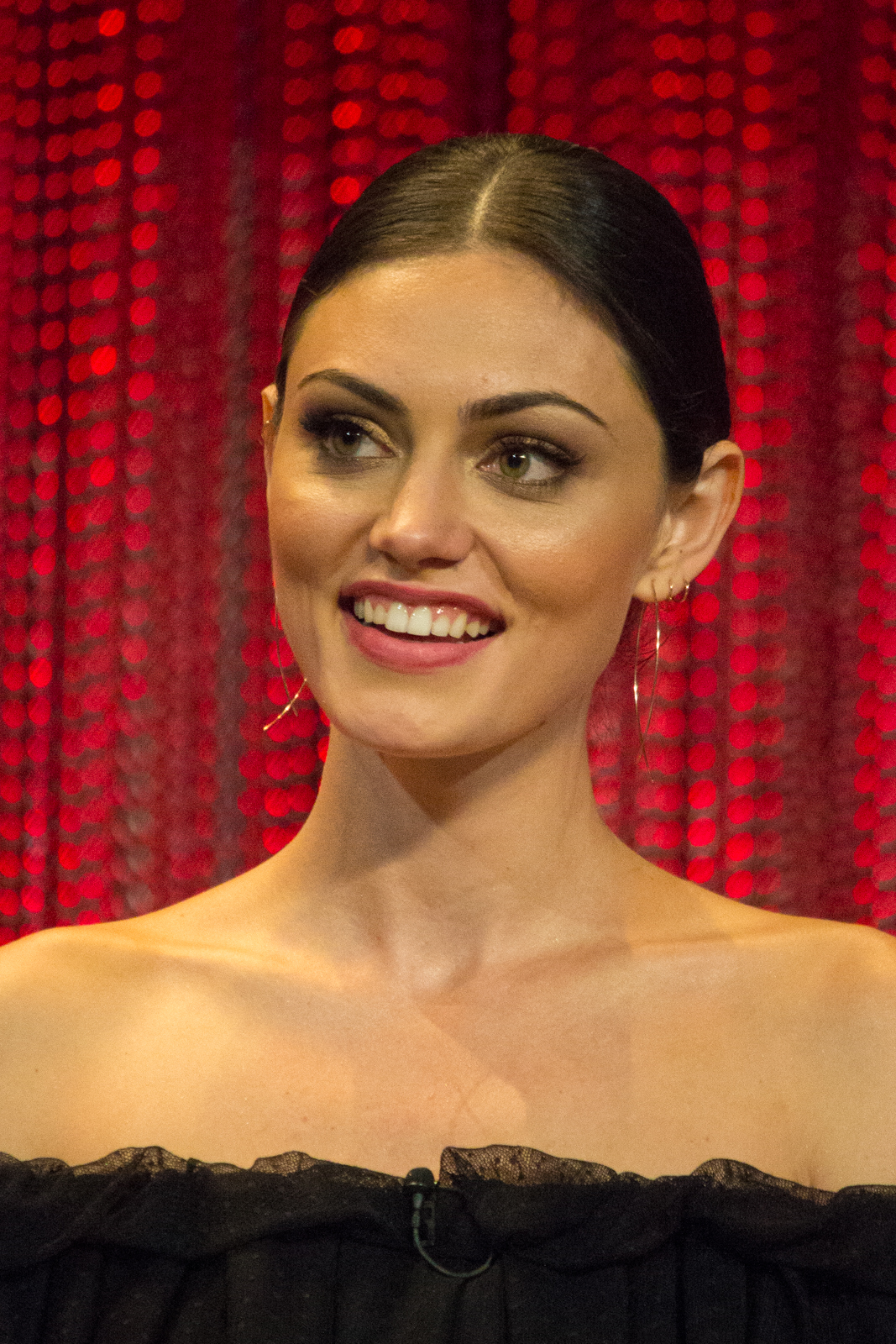
- Tonkin in 2014
- Born: Phoebe Jane Elizabeth Tonkin; 12 July 1989 (age 37); Sydney, New South Wales, Australia
- Occupation: Actress
- Years active: 2005–present
- Works: Filmography; other
- Spouse: Bernard Lagrange (m. 2025)
- Awards: Full list

Phoebe Jane Elizabeth Tonkin (born 12 July 1989) is an Australian actress. Her accolades include an AACTA Award, in addition to a nomination for a Logie Award.

Born and raised in Sydney, Tonkin began her career on Australian television and had her breakthrough playing Cleo Sertori in the Network Ten fantasy series H_{2}O: Just Add Water (2006–2010), for which she received acclaim and was nominated for the AACTA Award for Best Actress. Tonkin made her film debut as Fiona Maxwell in Stuart Beattie's apocalyptic war film Tomorrow, When the War Began (2010). After starring in the horror film Bait 3D (2012), she relocated to America, where she received acclaim for her roles as Faye Chamberlain in the CW supernatural drama series The Secret Circle (2011–2012) and Hayley Marshall in The Vampire Diaries (2012–2013) and The Originals (2013–2018).

Tonkin directed the short film Furlough (2016), starred in the Emmy-winning SBS thriller miniseries Safe Harbour (2018) and the Stan science fiction drama series Bloom (2019–2020), and appeared in Damien Chazelle's film Babylon (2022). In 2024, she received critical and awards attention for her dramatic leading performances in the Netflix miniseries Boy Swallows Universe and the sports film Kid Snow; the former won her the AACTA Award for Best Actress, her first major award win.

Offscreen, Tonkin has been labeled a fashion icon, with her fashion ventures, public appearances and partnerships with Chanel and Tiffany and Co. gaining widespread media attention. (Note: This information is referenced in the "fashion" section of this article.)

== Early life and education ==
Phoebe Tonkin was born on 12 July 1989 in Sydney, New South Wales, and grew up in the suburb of Mosman.

When she was 4, she attended dance courses in classical ballet, hip hop, contemporary dance and tap dance. At the age of 12, Tonkin began courses at the Australian Theatre for Young People (ATYP) at the Wharf Theatre. Tonkin graduated from Queenwood School for Girls.

== Career ==
=== 2000s: Beginnings and breakthrough ===
In 2005, Tonkin was cast in the role of Cleo Sertori on the Australian children's television series H_{2}O: Just Add Water, which follows the lives of three teenage girls who turn into mermaids. She worked on improving her swimming abilities during pre-production. The series premiered on 7 July 2006 on Network Ten, and went on to be aired to a worldwide audience of over 250 million. As part of the promotional activities for the series, Tonkin and her co-stars presented the "Best Band" award at the Nickelodeon UK Kids' Choice Awards in October 2007. In 2008, she was nominated for "Best Lead Actress in a Television Series" at the prestigious Australian Film Institute Awards. The series ran for three seasons, with the series finale airing on 16 April 2010.

=== 2010s: Worldwide recognition ===
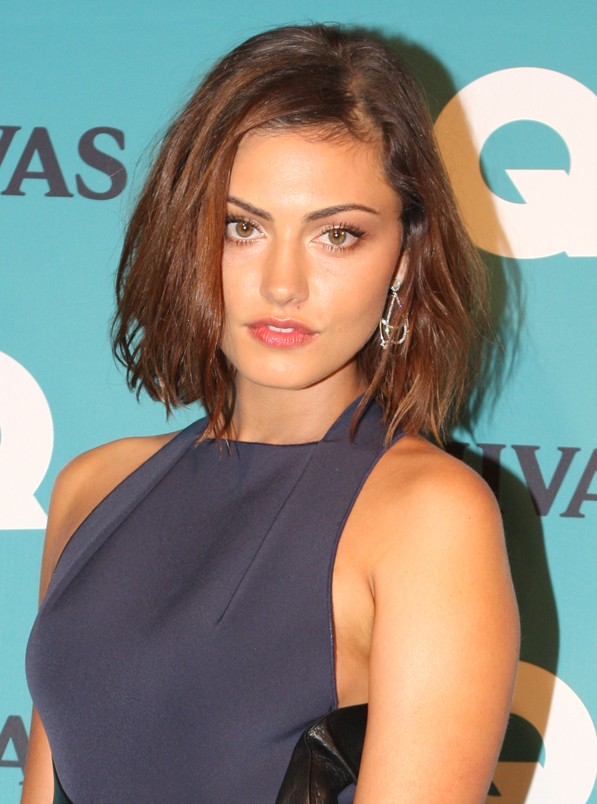
Tonkin at the GQ Men of the Year Awards in 2012

Tonkin has appeared on the Australian television shows Packed to the Rafters and Home and Away. In September 2010, she made her film debut starring in the Australian action ensemble film Tomorrow, When the War Began. The film revolves around a group of teenagers waging a guerrilla war against an invading foreign power in their fictional hometown of Wirrawee. Tonkin played the rich and uptight Fiona Maxwell. In December 2010, a sequel was announced, in which Tonkin was expected to return, but production never eventuated. In January 2011, Tonkin moved to Los Angeles to pursue her international acting career. In March 2011, she was cast as Faye Chamberlain in The CW's supernatural drama series The Secret Circle, which premiered on 15 September 2011 to over 3.5 million viewers. The series follows a group of young witches who form a secret coven. Tonkin received critical acclaim for her performance, with critics calling her the break-out star of the series; she was featured on Variety's list of "new faces to watch", and named one of 2011's break-out TV stars by E! Online. The show, however, had only one full season and was cancelled on 11 May 2012.

In August 2010, Tonkin was cast in the 3D horror film Bait 3D. Filming took place in the coastal city of Gold Coast, Queensland; the film follows a group of strangers trapped in a supermarket with a pack of great white sharks after a freak tsunami. Tonkin reunited with her H_{2}O: Just Add Water co-star Cariba Heine for this film, which was expected to be released in Australia in September 2012. In August 2012, Tonkin joined the cast of The CW television series The Vampire Diaries, in the recurring role of Hayley, a friend of Tyler's. Once again, she reunited with a co-star from H_{2}O: Just Add Water—this time Claire Holt, who portrays Rebekah Mikaelson on the show.

On 11 January 2013, The CW confirmed that a spin-off series to The Vampire Diaries was in the works, titled The Originals. The series revolves around the Original Vampire family members, and Tonkin would be "heavily featured in the prospective pilot" of the series. The CW confirmed on 13 February that Claire Holt would also join the cast of The Originals, marking the third time Tonkin and Holt have starred together on a show.

On 15 May 2017, SBS announced that Tonkin had been cast in their new four-part drama Safe Harbour about a group of Australians on a sailing vacation who come across a boat of refugees. Tonkin revealed on Instagram that her character's name would be "Olivia". The series received critical acclaim and won an International Emmy Award for Best TV Movie or Miniseries in 2019. She next appeared on an episode of The Affair as Delphine, a promiscuous art protégée.

After her having expressed in interviews a desire to continue working in Australia, it was announced on 20 August 2018 that Tonkin had been cast in Bloom, to be aired on the streaming platform Stan, as the young Gwen Reid, a character whose older version is portrayed by Jacki Weaver. In 2019, Tonkin wrote and directed her first short film, Furlough, which was screened around the world in film festivals in 2020. Since 2019, she has participated in the Tribeca Chanel Women's Filmmaker Program, aimed at empowering female directors.

=== 2020s: Established actress ===
In April 2021, it was announced that Tonkin would co-star in a horror film titled Night Shift, alongside Lamorne Morris and Madison Hu. The film will be directed by Paul and Benjamin China. Tonkin was featured in the 2023 historical fiction narrative podcast The Foxes of Hydesville, playing Leah Fox's companion, Adelaide Granger. In 2024, she starred as a struggling, drug addicted mother in Boy Swallows Universe, a Netflix coming of age miniseries based on the acclaimed semi-autobiographical novel of the same name by Trent Dalton. The series received widespread praise from critics, with Tonkin's performance being singled out as one of her best. Jessica Baker of WhoWhatWear wrote that Tonkin "is in the midst of a transformative period. Coming off a truly spectacular dramatic performance in Boy Swallows Universe." Dalton, who wrote the eponymous novel the series is based on, also praised Tonkin's performance, stating "Phoebe went right ahead and gave a performance across eight hours of television that is so raw and exposing and true and dark-as-night-sometimes and so filled with light and hope and heart and LOVE that it reminded me why I wanted to write Boy Swallows Universe in the first place." For her performance in Boy Swallows Universe, Tonkin was nominated for the 2024 Logie Award for Best Lead Actress in a Drama and won the 2025 AACTA Award for Best Lead Actress in a Drama Series, with the show also garnering a record breaking 22 AACTA nominations in total.

Tonkin's next project, the drama film Kid Snow, premiered at the Sydney Film Festival that same year. For Kid Snow, Tonkin was nominated for another AACTA award, the 2025 AACTA Award for Best Lead Actress in a Film. Whilst the film itself did not gain favourable reviews critically, Tonkin has been painted as a standout amongst the cast with her performance described as 'compelling'.

Also in the same year, Tonkin's film "And On The Eight Day" directed by Alexandra Chando premiered in April at Dallas International Film Festival after the film wrapped production in June 2023 in Texas. and has also appeared in the Chelsea Film Festival in New York.

In February 2024, it was announced that Tonkin would be starring in a new series adaption of the Sarah Bailey novel The Dark Lake, as the lead protagonist Gemma Woodstock.

== Other projects ==
=== Fashion ===
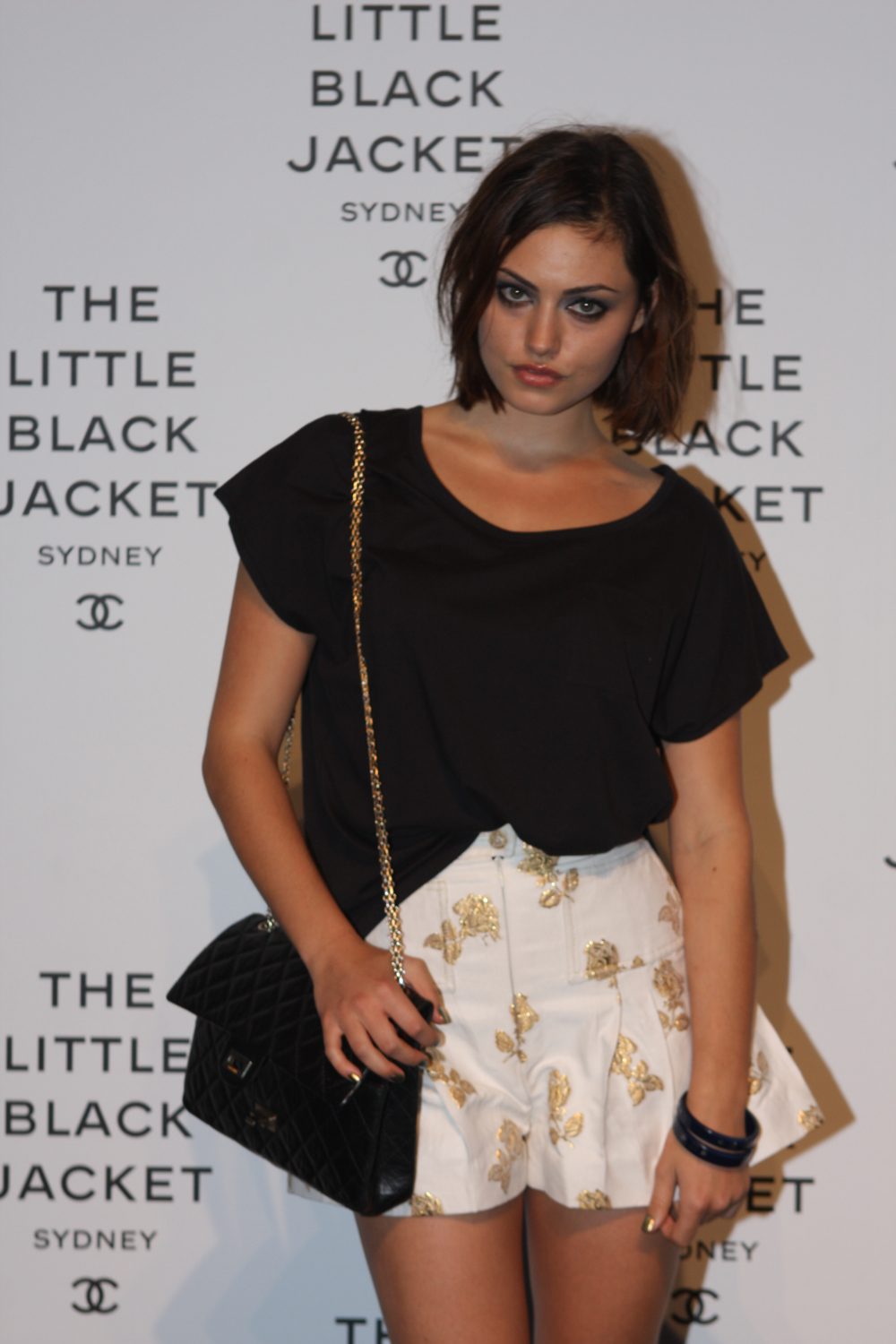
Tonkin at the Chanel The Little Black Jacket exhibition launch in Sydney (2012)

Labeled a fashion icon, Tonkin's fashion choices and public appearances have been widely publicised. Her promotion of Australian fashion and partnerships with major brands such as Chanel and Tiffany & Co. have also garnered significant media attention. She was included in Maxim's Hot 100 lists in 2021 and 2022. According to the public polling website Ranker, Tonkin is the second-most stunning Australian actress.

Tonkin has appeared as the face of New York-based stylist Ilona Hamer's swimwear line "Matteau Swim" from 2015 to 2017, completing 3 seasons with the brand. She supported the lifestyle clothing line for Witchery in 2015.

In September 2017, Tonkin appeared in the ad campaign "Journey To The Wild Side" for Smythson to promote their latest product range.

Tonkin is a Chanel brand ambassador. For the April 2018 issue of Vogue Australia, Tonkin underwent another photoshoot in partnership with Chanel makeup director Lucia Pica. She was revealed in September 2018 as one of nine women taking part in a digital campaign for Chanel's Gabrielle line of products.

In October 2020, Tonkin launched her own clothing brand "Lesjour!", a sustainable loungewear brand which Tonkin describes as being inspired by the leisure suit of the 70's and California living. Tonkin cited that the clothing brand was the reason she relocated permanently from New York back to LA - where the brand was designed, manufactured using EcoVero, and ships from. Tonkin stated that she'd had the idea for a clothing brand for two years, and decided to launch it as her job as an actress was affected by the COVID-19 pandemic.

=== Advocacy ===
In 2012, Tonkin opened a website about health with friend Teresa Palmer called Your Zen Life. In June 2015, Tonkin announced she was stepping down from her involvement in the site due to work commitments.

In 2017, Tonkin expressed support for the upcoming survey to gauge public opinion on legalising same-sex marriage in Australia, encouraging her fellow Australians to vote in the Australian Marriage Law Postal Survey as unlike most votes in Australia, this was not mandatory under law. Tonkin expressed her support for the legalisation and marriage equality.

Tonkin attended several Women's Marches across 2017 and 2018, both internationally and in her adopted home, the USA. Expressing her support for Women's, immigrant and LGBTQ rights.

In 2019, Tonkin lobbied in Sacramento on behalf of non-profit environmental group NRDC focusing on bills banning pesticides, protecting the coast from oil spills and protecting current laws against the incoming administration. She has also continually supported and worked with the group on social media to raise awareness against issues such as climate change and ocean pollution, with Tonkin saying "Growing up I was very conscious of my environmental footprint."

Tonkin has been a Global Ambassador for humanitarian organisation Plan International since 2015. In July 2024 it was announced that Tonkin had become a National Ambassador for the organisation's Australian counterpart, with a focus on supporting their Children in Crisis fund.

=== Other appearances ===
Tonkin appeared in the music video for Miles Fisher's 2011 single "Don't Let Go".

== Personal life ==
Tonkin was in a four-year relationship with American actor and The Vampire Diaries co-star Paul Wesley, with the relationship ending in 2017.

On 10 May 2025, Tonkin married art dealer Bernard Lagrange in New York City. Claire Holt and Shelley Hennig served as bridesmaids.

== Filmography ==
=== Film ===
Year	Title	Role	Notes
2010	Tomorrow, When the War Began	Fiona Maxwell	
2012	Bait 3D	Jaime	
2014	The Ever After	Mabel	
2016	Billionaire Ransom	Amy Tilton	Originally titled Take Down
2016	Cul-de-Sac	Mom	Short film
2018	Final Stop	The Girl	Short film
2019	The Place of No Words	Phoebe	
2020	Furlough	N/A	Short film; director, writer
2022	We Are Gathered Here Today	Brenda Stone	
2022	Babylon	Jane Thornton	
2023	Transfusion	Justine	
2024	Night Shift	Gwen Taylor	
2024	Kid Snow	Sunny	
2025	The 8th Day	Eve	
2025	A Love Letter To M	Sasha	Short film

=== Television ===
Year	Title	Role	Notes
2006–2010	H_{2}O: Just Add Water	Cleo Sertori	Main role; 78 episodes
2009–2010	Packed to the Rafters	Lexi	3 episodes
2010	Home and Away	Adrian Hall	Recurring role, 7 episodes
2011–2012	The Secret Circle	Faye Chamberlain	Main role; 22 episodes
2012–2013	The Vampire Diaries	Hayley Marshall	Recurring role (season 4), 8 episodes
2013–2018	The Originals	Hayley Marshall	Main role; 86 episodes
2015	Stalker	Nicole Clark	Episode: "My Hero"
2017	Pillow Talk	Sonja	Episode: "Rabbit Hole"
2018	Safe Harbour	Olivia Gallagher	Miniseries
2018	These New South Whales	Herself	Web series; episode: "Round The Twist" (cameo)
2018	The Affair	Delphine	Episode: 405
2019–2020	Bloom	Young Gwen Reid	Web series
2020	Westworld	Penny	Episodes: "Parce Domine", "The Mother of Exiles"
2024	Boy Swallows Universe	Frances “Frankie” Bell	Main role; 7 episodes
2026	Two Years Later	Emily	Lead role; 8 episodes
TBA	The Dark Lake	Gemma Woodstock	Lead role; also executive producer

=== Other performances ===
- Music video: "Don't Let Go" (2012) by Miles Fisher, as Female lead
- Podcast: The Foxes of Hydesville (2023), as Adelaide Granger

== Awards and nominations ==
Award	Year of ceremony	Category	Nominated work	Result	Ref.
AACTA Awards	2008	Best Actress in a Drama Series	H_{2}O: Just Add Water	Nominated	
AACTA Awards	2025	Best Actress in a Drama Series	Boy Swallows Universe	Won	
AACTA Awards	2025	Best Lead Actress in a Film	Kid Snow	Nominated	
AACTA Awards	2025	Audience Choice Best Actress	—	Nominated	
Hang on to Your Shorts Film Festival	2017	Best Actress in a Short Film (Medium)	Cul-de-Sac	Nominated	
Northeast Film Festival	2017	Best Actress in a Short Film	Cul-de-Sac	Nominated	
Equity Ensemble Awards	2019	Outstanding Performance by an Ensemble in a Miniseries of Telemovie	Safe Harbour	Nominated	
Logie Awards	2024	Best Lead Actress in a Drama	Boy Swallows Universe	Nominated	
Marie Claire Women Of The Year Awards	2024	Entertainer Of The Year	Boy Swallows Universe	Nominated	
