= Chai Hansen =

Australian-Thai actor (born 1989)

Chai Hansen สุรชัย รมย์รื่น (Thai)
- Born: Surachai Romruen; February 8, 1989 (age 37); Ko Samui, Thailand
- Occupation: Actor
- Years active: 2012–present
- Height: 1.78 m (5 ft 10 in)

Chai Hansen (born Surachai Romruen, Thai: สุรชัย รมย์รื่น; February 8, 1989) is a Thai-Australian actor. He is best known for his role as Zac in Mako Mermaids, Tim Ahern in The Newsreader, Ilian in The 100 and Jordan Kyle in Shadowhunters.

== Early life ==
Hansen was born in Ko Samui, an island in the Gulf of Thailand in 1989. He was born to a Thai father, Superut Romruen and an Australian mother, Sandra Hansen. At the age of seven, Hansen migrated to Australia with his mother and sister Sarah Romruen.

== Career ==
In 2011, it was announced that Hansen would join the cast of internationally distributed series Mako Mermaids. In season 2 onwards, he and Alex Cubis portrayed mermen, alongside Lucy Fry and Isabel Durant, who portrayed mermaids.

Hansen was cast in role in the recurring role of Ilian in the fourth season of The 100. He was then cast as Monkey in The New Legends of Monkey, a new spin on classic tale Journey to the West.

In early 2018, Hansen was cast in a recurring role in the third season of Shadowhunters as Jordan Kyle, a werewolf on a quest for redemption.

In May 2021, Hansen was cast as a series regular in the Amazon series Night Sky, playing the role of Jude.

Hansen was cast as Tim Ahern, a gay cameraman on ABC series The Newsreader (2021 - 2025). He appeared in all three seasons of the show's run.

On 17 February 2025, Hansen was named in Stan Australia series Watching You.

== Filmography ==
=== Television ===
Year	Title	Role	Notes
2013–2016	Mako: Island of Secrets	Zac Blakely	TV series, seasons 1–4, 68 episodes (main)
2017–2018	The 100	Ilian	Season 4, 7 episodes (recurring)
2018–2019	Shadowhunters: The Mortal Instruments	Jordan Kyle	TV series, season 3, 11 episodes (recurring)
2018–2020	The New Legends of Monkey	Monkey / Shadow Monkey	TV series, seasons 1–2, 20 episodes (main)
2021–2025	The Newsreader	Tim Ahern	TV series, seasons 1–3, 11 episodes (recurring)
2022	Night Sky	Jude	TV series, season 1, 8 episodes (recurring)
2024	Population 11	Gareth Biggins	TV series, season 1, 6 episodes (recurring)
2024	We Were Tomorrow	Noah	TV series, season 1, 6 episodes (recurring)
2025	Apple Cider Vinegar	Arlo	Miniseries
2025	Watching You	Cain	TV series, 6 episodes

=== Film ===
Year	Title	Role	Notes
2012	Dead Moon Circus	Sean	Film
2013	Dead Moon Circus Part 2	Sean	Film
2013	Pavlomance	Zac	Short film
2013	Revolving Doors	Kitchen	Short film
2018	Thicker Than Water	Ivan	Feature film
2022	Christmas Ransom	Greg	Feature film
2025	Play Dirty	Stan Devers	Feature film
2026	Thrash	Brian	Feature film
