= Mako: Island of Secrets =

Australian television series

- Australian intertitle
- Also known as: Mako Mermaids; Secret of Mako Island
- Genre: Children / teen drama; Fantasy
- Created by: Jonathan M. Shiff
- Written by: Sam Carroll; Anthony Morris; Chris Roache
- Directed by: Evan Clarry; Grant Brown
- Starring: Lucy Fry; Ivy Latimer; Amy Ruffle; Chai Romruen; Isabel Durant; Allie Bertram; Gemma Forsyth; Alex Cubis; Linda Ngo
- Opening theme: "I Just Wanna Be" by Chantelle Defina & Jack Dacy
- Ending theme: "I Just Wanna Be"
- Composers: Ricky Edwards; Brett Aplin; Ric Formosa
- Country of origin: Australia
- Original language: English
- No. of series: 3
- No. of episodes: 68 (list of episodes)

Production
- Executive producers: Jonathan M. Shiff; Julia Adams; Nicole Keeb; Arne Lohmann
- Producer: Jonathan M. Shiff
- Cinematography: Zenon Sawko; Simon Christidis
- Editors: Peter Crombie; Rohan Cooper; Ahmad Halimi
- Camera setup: Single camera
- Running time: 26 minutes
- Production companies: Jonathan M. Shiff Productions; ZDF Enterprises

Original release
- Network: Network Ten (2013); Eleven (2013–2016)
- Release: 26 July 2013 – 28 August 2016

Related
- H_{2}O: Just Add Water; H_{2}O: Mermaid Adventures

Mako: Island of Secrets is an Australian television programme for children and teenagers created by Jonathan M. Shiff. Internationally released as Mako Mermaids, the show is a spin-off of H_{2}O: Just Add Water and is produced by Jonathan M. Shiff Productions in association with Network Ten, ZDF and Netflix, with assistance from Screen Australia and Screen Queensland.

Set several years after its predecessor, the series follows Zac Blakely, a teenage boy who is transformed into a merman after falling into the magical pool of water on the island of Mako.

== Plot ==
Five years following the events of H2O: Just Add Water, a pod of true-born mermaids has re-colonized the waters surrounding Mako Island after a long absence. Zac Blakely, a local teenage boy, decides to go camping on Mako Island with his friend Cameron, unaware that three true-born mermaids, Lyla, Nixie, and Sirena (assigned to guard the island during the full moon), are watching him. That night, as the full moon rises, Zac is lured to the Moon Pool and falls in with the full moon overhead. The following morning, Zac discovers that he has the ability to control and manipulate water. Later, after accidentally falling into the water, he finds that he has also become a merman with a fish-like tail. His newfound merman abilities threaten to expose the existence of merpeople. After being cast out by their pod for allowing Zac to visit the island, the three mermaids, curious about living on land and motivated to remove Zac's powers, venture onto the land and learn to live among humans.

In series two, the mermaids continue to uncover Mako's secrets and learn more about the merman chamber. With Lyla and Nixie away searching for a new home, Sirena is left with Ondina and Mimmi, new mermaids who continue the effort to remove Zac's powers and reclaim the island for their pod. Evie, Zac's girlfriend, faces her own battles when, while trying to save Zac from an ambush, she is transformed into a mermaid herself, and the others try to help her cope with the change. Things are further complicated by the arrival of Erik, another merman. They also discover that Zac is a born merman and is Mimmi's brother.

In series three, with Sirena away in Hawaii with her sister Aquata, Zac, Ondina and Mimmi are joined by Weilan, an Eastern mermaid who has fled to Mako for sanctuary from a magical water dragon that has the power to destroy merfolk. Evie loses her mermaid tail and powers during her confrontation with the dragon, but learns to cope with life as a human again. The mermaids discover that the dragon is revealed to be Nerissa, Zac and Mimmi's long-lost mother, and must find a way to save her.

== Episodes ==
Series	Episodes	Originally released	
Series	Episodes	First released	Last released
1	26	26 July 2013	12 January 2014
2	26	15 February 2015	9 August 2015
3	16	15 May 2016	28 August 2016

== Cast ==
=== Main ===
- Lucy Fry as Lyla Santos (series 1), seen as the leader of the three mermaids. She is hot-headed, rebellious, determined, but still very smart. Despite initially only being interested in him for the sake of removing his powers, she develops an attachment to Zac. She has left with Nixie to search for a new home for the pod in season 2.
- Ivy Latimer as Nixie (series 1), one of the three mermaids. She is an adventurous girl who often gets into trouble and only does what she believes is right. In series 2, it is explained that she has left with Lyla to search for a new home for the mermaid pod.
- Amy Ruffle as Sirena (series 1–2), one of the three mermaids. Naïve and sweet, she acts as a mediator and peacemaker when Lyla and Nixie quarrel. In series 3, it is explained that she has left with her sister Aquata to go on vacation in Hawaii.
- Chai Romruen as Zac, who becomes a merman after falling into the Moon Pool during a full moon while camping on Mako Island. He grew up surfing and is sporty. In series 2, he discovers that he was born a merman and that Mimmi is his sister.
- Isabel Durant as Ondina (series 2–3), a mermaid who works to remove Zac's powers. She is headstrong and tries to do things her way.
- Allie Bertram as Mimmi (series 2–3), a mermaid who works to remove Zac's powers. She is intelligent and inquisitive, and occasionally has to bail Ondina out of trouble. She eventually finds out that Zac is her long-lost brother.
- Gemma Forsyth as Evie (recurring, series 1; main, series 2–3), who is Zac's girlfriend. In series one, she believes the girls are stalking her and is jealous of Zac spending time with Lyla. She eventually learns the girls are mermaids and apologises for her quick judgement. She is accidentally transformed into a mermaid in series two and back into a land girl again in series three.
- Alex Cubis as Erik (series 2), a merman who is descended from a line of mermen who have not been seen for thousands of years. He is solitary and elusive. Erik is a waiter at Ocean Cafe with Carly.
- Linda Ngo as Weilan (series 3), a Chinese mermaid who accidentally leads a magic water dragon to Mako. She is sassy and has a dry wit. She prefers sleeping and socialising on land as the dragon has caused her to be wary of life in the ocean.

=== Recurring ===
- Dominic Deutscher as Cam, Zac's best friend who quickly becomes aware of Zac's transformation into a merman. While Cam is initially supportive of his friend and helps to keep his secret, he becomes jealous of Zac's powers. He is outraged when Zac tries to return the trident to its chamber, and works to become a merman himself. They later make up, and Cam helps Zac destroy the merman chamber.
- Kerith Atkinson as Rita Santos, the school principal and a mermaid. She left her pod years ago to be with a human boy she fell in love with, but who died before they could marry. She serves as a source of knowledge and history for the girls, and teaches them how to properly use their powers.
- Rowan Hills as David, an employee at the Ocean Cafe. He and Sirena become mutual love interests. David finds out about mermaids at the end of series 2.
- Brooke Lee as Carly, an employee at the Ocean Cafe. She had feelings for David, but is now with Cam. She is also Evie's best friend, and later finds out about merpeople in series 2.

== Development and production ==
=== Series one ===
The show, announced in July 2011, consists of 26 episodes of 26 minutes each, plus an option for one 90-minute episode. Filming was to begin in April 2012, but it was postponed to the beginning of May. On 8 May 2012, Shiff Productions announced the principal cast and the start of the shoot. Filming ran through 12 October 2012. Mako was scheduled to broadcast in the second half of 2013, with a second series confirmed before the first had screened. Production of the first series totalled A$12.3 million.

The show was first announced as Mako: Island of Secrets, then as Secret of Mako Island, and finally as Mako Mermaids for its international release. It debuted domestically on Network Ten as Mako: Island of Secrets on 26 July 2013.

In partnership with Shiff Productions, Netflix is the exclusive internet television provider for the series. The first thirteen episodes were released on 26 July 2013, with the second half of the season airing on 15 September 2013. On 8 November 2013, broadcasts of the show were switched from Network Ten to the free-to-air digital channel Eleven, first airing on Friday mornings at 8:00 a.m. and later changed to Sunday mornings at 11:00 a.m.

=== Series two ===
A second series was confirmed in February 2013, with production beginning in the second half of 2013 contingent on funding from Screen Australia. The first half of series two premiered on Netflix on 13 February 2015 in North and Latin America, United Kingdom, and other territories. In Australia, the second series screened on Eleven Sunday mornings at 10:00 a.m. from 15 February 2015. The second half of the series was released on Netflix on 29 May 2015. Netflix labelled the first half as series two, while the second half was called series three.

=== Series three ===
A third series of 16 episodes was announced in 2014, began screening on Eleven on 15 May 2016 and was released on Netflix on 27 May 2016. The series introduced Chinese mermaid Weilan (Linda Ngo), and featured the special guest appearance of Cariba Heine as Rikki Chadwick in the final two episodes.

A movie was planned to be produced after the series ended. However, the plan has been put on hold indefinitely.

Series 3 is listed under Season 4 on Netflix, as Netflix released Series 2 in two separate parts in 2015.

== International release dates ==
Country / region	Channel	Series premiere	Title in country	Source(s)
Australia	Network Ten; Eleven	26 July 2013	Mako: Island of Secrets	
United Kingdom	Netflix	26 July 2013	Mako Mermaids	
United States	Netflix	26 July 2013	Mako Mermaids: An H_{2}O Adventure	

== See also ==
- Mermaids in popular culture
