= Kid Snow =

Upcoming Australian film by Paul Goldman

- Theatrical release poster
- Directed by: Paul Goldman
- Screenplay by: John Brumpton
- Produced by: Lizzette Atkins; Bruno Charlesworth
- Starring: Billy Howle; Phoebe Tonkin
- Cinematography: Garry Phillips
- Edited by: Sylvie Landra Matthew Dafkovski
- Music by: Warren Ellis
- Production companies: Unicorn Films; Immaculate Conception Film; Wynn Media
- Distributed by: Madman Entertainment
- Release dates: June 11, 2024 (Sydney Film Festival); September 12, 2024 (Australia); February 14, 2025 (United States)
- Running time: 127 minutes
- Country: Australia
- Language: English
- Box office: $43,392

Kid Snow is a 2024 Australian sports drama film directed by Paul Goldman from a screenplay by John Brumpton. Starring Billy Howle and Phoebe Tonkin and set in the 1970s, the film's plot follows the titular character (Howle), a washed-up boxer who falls in love with a single mother (Tonkin). Production took place in the Goldfields–Esperance region of Western Australia.

Kid Snow premiered at the Sydney Film Festival on 11 June 2024. Distributed by Madman Entertainment, the film began its theatrical run in Australia on 12 September 2024 and was released in the United States in February 2025. The film received mixed reviews from critics, who criticised the screenplay and story pacing but highly praised Tonkin's performance, which was nominated for Best Actress at the 14th AACTA Awards.

== Plot ==
A washed-up Irish boxer named Kid Snow is faced with a chance to redeem himself when he is offered a rematch against the man he fought a decade prior. When he meets single mother Sunny, he is forced to think of a future beyond boxing.

== Cast ==
- Billy Howle as Kid
- Tom Bateman as Rory
- Phoebe Tonkin as Sunny
- Hunter Page-Lochard as Lizard
- Mark Coles Smith as Lovely
- Nathan Phillips as Billy
- Shaka Cook as Armless
- Jake LaTorre as Darcy
- Robert Taylor as Ed
- Tristan Gorey as Hammer
- Vito de Francesco as Frank
- Tasma Walton as Betty
- John Brumpton as Jack
- Nick Britton as Danny
- Anthony Sharpe as Slim

== Production ==
The production began filming between May and July 2022 in the Goldfields–Esperance region and in Perth, Western Australia, making it the first film production in Western Australia following the lifting of the state's COVID-19 border restrictions. The film concluded post-production in 2023 before being selected to premiere at the 2024 Sydney Film Festival.

== Release ==
Kid Snow premiered at the Sydney Film Festival on 11 June 2024, and began its theatrical run in Australia on 12 September 2024.

== Reception and accolades ==
The film received mixed reviews from critics. Luke Buckmaster of The Guardian criticised the film's "borderline laboured" screenplay and dialogue, and pointed out issues with its pacing, stating "the structure drifts and you don't get a strong sense the drama is escalating and the stakes increasing." He however praised the "compelling performances" of Howle and Tonkin, stating the latter "brings a weary, baggy-eyed melancholia that’s quite interesting; you can feel her nudging the drama towards a heavier and moodier key."

Damien Straker of Impulse Gamer also praised Tonkin's acting, pointing out her "tough, resilient turn" in the role. Cris Kennedy of Inner East Review and Sandra Hall of Sydney Morning Herald were more positive towards the film overall; both also drew particular attention to Tonkin's performance.

For her acclaimed performance, Tonkin received a nomination for the AACTA Award for Best Actress in a Leading Role at the 2025 ceremony.

== See also ==
- List of boxing films
