= A Model Daughter: The Killing of Caroline Byrne =

2009 television film

- Directed by: Tony Tilse
- Written by: Peter Gawler
- Produced by: Karl Zwicky
- Starring: Cariba Heine; Garry McDonald; David Lyons
- Production company: Network Ten
- Release date: 2009
- Running time: 94 minutes
- Country: Australia
- Language: English

A Model Daughter: The Killing of Caroline Byrne is a 2009 Australian television film based on alleged events surrounding the death of Caroline Byrne on 7 June 1995. Byrne was found in the early morning of 8 June at the base of a cliff at The Gap, a notorious suicide spot in Sydney.

At the time, the police initially wrote the case off as suicide, but contradicting evidence soon began to arise, and suspicions were directed towards her boyfriend, Gordon Wood. The case became one of the longest running in Australian history, and a trial convicting Wood for the murder of Byrne did not come to a close until November 2008, where he was sentenced to 17 years in prison.

The movie about this unusual case went into production shortly after the sentence had been confirmed, having been commissioned by Network Ten. It starred Cariba Heine as Byrne, Garry McDonald as Caroline's father Tony Byrne, and David Lyons as Byrne's boyfriend Gordon Wood.

Wood was acquitted of Byrne's murder in February 2012, after serving three and a half years in Goulburn jail. A unanimous decision was given by the Court of Appeal that there was insufficient evidence to show beyond reasonable doubt that Wood murdered Byrne.

== Cast ==
- Cariba Heine as Caroline Byrne
- David Lyons as Gordon Wood
- Garry McDonald as Tony Byrne
- Gyton Grantley as Andrew Blanchett
- Tiriel Mora as Rene Rivkin
- Heather Mitchell as June Dally-Watkins
- Gabrielle Scollay as Deanna Byrne
- Indiana Evans as Kylie Watson
- Kylie Watson as Tania Zaetta
- Russell Kiefel as John Abernethy
- Sarah Chadwick as Andrea Byrne
- Diana McLean as Brenda Wood
- Lewis Fitz-Gerald as Gary Jubelin
- Matthew Brodtke as Party Guest
