= The Secrets She Keeps =

Australian psychological thriller drama

- Promotional poster
- Genre: Drama; Psychological thriller
- Based on: The Secrets She Keeps by Michael Robotham
- Developed by: Sarah Walker
- Directed by: Catherine Millar; Jennifer Leacey
- Starring: Laura Carmichael; Jessica De Gouw; Michael Dorman; Ryan Corr; Michael Sheasby; Cariba Heine; Eva Greenwood
- Theme music composer: Cathy Dennis and Rob Davis
- Opening theme: Can't Get You Out of My Head by Juice Webster
- Composer: Amanda Brown
- Country of origin: Australia
- Original language: English
- No. of seasons: 2
- No. of episodes: 12

Production
- Executive producers: Rick Maier; Jason Stephens; Sara Richardson; Pilar Perez; Nicky Davies Williams
- Producers: Paul Watters; Helen Bowden; Diane Haddon
- Production locations: Blue Mountains, New South Wales, Australia
- Camera setup: Multi-camera
- Running time: 43 minutes
- Production company: Lingo Pictures

Original release
- Network: Network 10 (season 1); Paramount+ (season 2)
- Release: 22 April 2020 – 16 August 2022

The Secrets She Keeps is an Australian psychological thriller drama television series that premiered on Network 10 on 22 April 2020 at 8:45 pm. The series is written by Sarah Walker and Jonathan Gavin, based on the psychological thriller novel by Michael Robotham.

The first season was given a special release on 10Play on 4 April 2020 as a part of the streaming website's "10 shows in 10 days" promotion during the COVID-19 pandemic. A second season premiered on streaming service Paramount+ on 12 July 2022.

== Premise ==
The series is set in Sydney and is about two women from vastly different backgrounds with explosive secrets that could destroy everything they hold dear.

== Cast and characters ==
- Laura Carmichael as Agatha Fyfle
- Jessica De Gouw as Meghan Shaughnessy
- Michael Dorman (season 1) and Todd Lasance (season 2) as Jack Shaughnessy
- Ryan Corr as Simon Beecher
- Michael Sheasby as Hayden Cole
- Cariba Heine as Grace
- Jenni Baird as Rhea Bowden
- Elizabeth Alexander as Renee Cole
- Hazem Shammas as Cyrus Haven
- Mansoor Noor as Jeremy Clay
- Eva Greenwood as Lucy Shaughnessy
- Jonny Pasvolsky as Crown Prosecutor
- Sonia Todd as Judge
- Gosia Dobrowolska as Anna Nowak
- Guy Edmonds as Detective Poulos
- Ling-Hsueh Tang as Jocelyn
- Heather Mitchell as Jenny
- Zac Drayson as John Jones
- Lucy Bell as Belinda
- CJ Bloomfield as Brent Scicluna
- Nicholas Hope as Brother Bowler
- Victoria Haralabidou as Detective Cash

== Episodes ==
=== Series overview ===
Series	Episodes	Originally released		
Series	Episodes	First released	Last released	Network
1	6	22 April 2020	27 May 2020	Network 10
2	6	12 July 2022	16 August 2022	Paramount+

=== Season 1 (2020) ===
No.	Title	Directed by	Written by	Original release date	Prod. code	Australian metro viewers (millions)
1	Episode 1	Catherine Millar	Sarah Walker	22 April 2020	359917-1	0.54
Heavily pregnant supermarket shelf-stacker Agatha is obsessed with Meghan Shaughnessy's seemingly perfect life. But is there more to her covetous gaze than simply admiration?
2	Episode 2	Catherine Millar	Sarah Walker	29 April 2020	359917-2	0.57
Meghan's explosive secret comes to light. With Meghan's due date brought forward, Agatha must step up her plans.
3	Episode 3	Jennifer Leacey	Jonathan Gavin	6 May 2020	359917-3	0.39
A scarring trauma in Agatha's past is revealed. Meghan heads to the hospital to have her baby, unaware that she might be in danger.
4	Episode 4	Jennifer Leacey	Jonathan Gavin	13 May 2020	359917-4	0.42
Agatha has created her perfect family with her baby and Hayden. But an old flame of Agatha's threatens to thwart her plans.
5	Episode 5	Catherine Millar	Jonathan Gavin	20 May 2020	359917-5	0.51
Meghan and Agatha come face to face. Agatha panics over baby Rory's deteriorating health.
6	Episode 6	Catherine Millar	Sarah Walker	27 May 2020	359917-6	0.55
Agatha is on the run with baby Rory. Will Meghan get her baby boy back?

=== Season 2 (2022) ===
No. overall	No. in season	Title	Directed by	Written by	Original release date	Prod. code	Australian metro viewers (millions)
7	1	Episode 1	Jennifer Leacey	Sarah Walker	12 July 2022	TBA	N/A
Two years after Agatha kidnapped Meghan’s baby Ben, it is time for Agatha to be tried in court. Meghan, Jack and their entire family have attempted to move on as best they could, but their lives have remained deeply affected by the trauma. A young investigative journalist, hungry to report on Agatha’s side of the story, hounds Meghan for information.
8	2	Episode 2	Jennifer Leacey	Sarah Walker	19 July 2022	TBA	N/A
Old secrets threaten to re-emerge and ruin lives once again, as Jack’s former affair with Rhea comes back to haunt him, while Grace’s and Simon’s blossoming relationship makes Meghan uncomfortable in more ways than one. Agatha orchestrates subterfuge while in prison, playing dangerous power games with guards, fellow inmates and the prison’s authorities.
9	3	Episode 3	Jennifer Leacey	Sarah Walker	26 July 2022	TBA	N/A
As Lorelei’s podcast about Agatha’s story becomes a success, Meghan continues to shun the ambitious young journalist. But Lorelei persists with her investigations and eventually comes face to face with Agatha. Meanwhile, Agatha fights to hold on to her baby as the authorities attempt to identify the prison officer who fathered it. Grace and Simon decide to make their relationship known to Grace’s sister Meghan, but Meghan’s past with Simon has a potentially destructive secret at its core.
10	4	Episode 4	Jennifer Leacey	Michael Robotham	2 August 2022	TBA	N/A
Tensions erupt, with Meghan and Jack's marriage in tatters. Meanwhile, Lorelei finds she's gone a step too far, but will a visit from the police be enough to deter her? Everyone is all out to salvage what they value most from the wreckage.
11	5	Episode 5	Jennifer Leacey	Sarah Bassiunoi	9 August 2022	TBA	N/A
Meghan finds herself in jail with the last person she would have wanted to encounter. Meanwhile, Lorelei is out of control, and it’s those who are closest to her who are able to spot the early signs.
12	6	Episode 6	Jennifer Leacey	Sarah Walker	16 August 2022	TBA	N/A
Agatha and Meghan face their hardest trials yet, but neither can predict what's coming.

== International broadcast ==
In Ireland, the series was broadcast on RTÉ One from 9 June 2020 and made available to stream on RTÉ Player. Season 2 was broadcast from 2 August 2022 on RTÉ One and RTÉ Player.

In the United Kingdom, the series is broadcast through the BBC. The first season was allocated a primetime slot on BBC One in July 2020, and all episodes were concurrently available on BBC iPlayer.

The show screens on streaming service Sundance Now in the United States.
