= Bait 3D =

2012 3D horror disaster film

- Theatrical release poster
- Directed by: Kimble Rendall
- Written by: Russell Mulcahy; John Kim
- Produced by: Gary Hamilton; Todd Fellman; Peter Barber
- Starring: Xavier Samuel; Sharni Vinson; Adrian Pang; Qi Yuwu; Alex Russell; Phoebe Tonkin; Martin Sacks; Alice Parkinson; Lincoln Lewis; Damien Garvey; Dan Wyllie; Julian McMahon
- Cinematography: Ross Emery
- Edited by: Rodrigo Balart
- Music by: Joe Ng; Alex Oh
- Production companies: Screen Australia; Media Development Authority; Darclight Films; Blackmagic Design; Pictures in Paradise; Story Bridge Films; Screen Queensland; Bait Holdings
- Distributed by: Paramount Pictures; (Australia and New Zealand); Golden Village; (Singapore)
- Release dates: 5 September 2012 (Venice); 20 September 2012 (Australia); 29 November 2012 (Singapore)
- Running time: 93 minutes
- Countries: Australia; Singapore
- Language: English
- Budget: $20 million
- Box office: $33.5 million

Bait 3D is a 2012 3D disaster horror film directed by Kimble Rendall and written by John Kim and Russell Mulcahy. (Note: Additional writing by Duncan Kennedy, Justin Monjo, Shayne Armstrong, and S. P. Krause.) It stars Sharni Vinson, Phoebe Tonkin, Xavier Samuel, Julian McMahon, Cariba Heine, Alex Russell, Lincoln Lewis, Alice Parkinson, and Dan Wyllie as a group of people trapped in a flooded supermarket by a tsunami and hunted by great white sharks.

A co-production between Australia and Singapore, Bait 3D premiered at the Venice Film Festival on 1 September 2012, before being released theatrically on 20 September 2012 in Australia and 29 November 2012 in Singapore. It received mixed reviews but was a commercial success, grossing $32.5 million on a budget of $20 million.

== Plot ==
In Australia, hungover lifeguard Josh is woken up by his friend and fellow lifeguard Rory, who asks Josh if he regrets proposing to Rory's sister Tina. Josh visits Tina, who discusses their upcoming move to Singapore. As Rory enters the ocean to set a buoy for Josh, a great white shark kills a man in the water. Alerted to the danger, Josh quickly takes a jet ski to save Rory, who is killed by the shark before Josh reaches him.

A year later, Josh works for a supermarket in Coolangatta. While stocking shelves with his co-worker Naomi, he sees Tina and her new boyfriend Steven returning from Singapore. At the same time, teenagers Kyle and Heather are making out in their car. A young woman named Jaime is caught shoplifting and temporarily evades the security guard by meeting up with her boyfriend Ryan, who also works at the store. Store manager Jessup catches up with her, fires Ryan, and calls the police. Arresting officer Todd arrives and is revealed to be Jaime's father. Jessup is suddenly held at gunpoint by a robber named Doyle. Tensions escalate and Doyle's masked partner appears, shooting assistant manager Julie.

At the height of the commotion, a tsunami wave descends on the city and floods the supermarket. Doyle's partner is killed by the flood, and the survivors are forced to take shelter on top of shelving units. As they try to find a way out, security guard Bob is dragged underwater and killed. It becomes apparent that a 12 ft (3.7 m) great white shark has been washed into the store by the tsunami, and a broken wire threatens to electrocute them all. Steven volunteers to shut off the power and the others dress him in crude armor made of shopping carts and shelves to protect him from the shark. He succeeds, but loses his oxygen tube and drowns. Despite their previous conflicts, the survivors work together to get Jessup into a ventilation shaft to find help. Crabs slide out of the vent, startling Jessup and causing him to fall back. He manages to grab hold onto the vent, but the shark jumps out of the water and bites him in half.

Kyle, Heather, and Ryan have been cut off from the others and are trapped in the parking garage, surviving the flooding as their cars were sealed when the water hit. Ryan helps the couple escape from their flooded car, but a second great white shark is revealed to have entered the parking garage. Kyle abandons Heather's Pomeranian dog Bully, and they manage to get to temporary safety. After several unsuccessful attempts at luring the shark away, Ryan decides to join them on top of his flipped van, but the shark chases him. Ryan successfully climbs onto the van, but Kyle falls and is eaten.

Inside the supermarket, the remaining group makes a plan to catch the first shark so they can swim to safety. Jaime manages to swim to the butcher section and grab a hook with meat to use as bait. The shark does not go for the bait, so fellow survivor Kirby grabs a hook and puts it through Naomi's shirt, using her as bait. Kirby is revealed to be Doyle's partner, who changed out of his clothes and mask so the others wouldn't know his identity. Doyle stabs Kirby with a makeshift harpoon and throws him into the water with the hook. Naomi is pulled from the water as the shark devours Kirby, catching its jaw on the hook and ensnaring itself in the trap. Josh apologizes to Tina, feeling guilty over Rory's death, but Tina reassures him and kisses him.

Bully is found alive in the parking garage, and Heather's newfound hope inspires Ryan to start banging on the pipes, calling for help. Jaime hears Ryan's call and goes to rescue him with Josh. Below, they are alerted to the second shark's presence. Josh and Jaime find her dad's car, which has a shotgun and taser inside. Josh kills the shark with the shotgun, and the four of them get back into the supermarket. A tremor strikes as they are all swimming to the entrance, breaking the first shark loose. Josh kills it with the taser as Doyle finds a truck jammed in the entrance and rigs it to explode, breaking a hole in the debris and freeing them. The survivors leave the supermarket, reaching the severely damaged city, and Tina asks Josh what to do next.

Out at sea, a seagull swoops low over the water, and a shark jumps out and devours it.

== Cast ==
- Xavier Samuel as Josh Simons
- Sharni Vinson as Tina Radcliffe
- Adrian Pang as Jessup
- Qi Yuwu as Steven
- Alex Russell as Ryan
- Phoebe Tonkin as Jaime
- Martin Sacks as Todd
- Alice Parkinson as Naomi
- Julian McMahon as Doyle
- Dan Wyllie as Kirby
- Cariba Heine as Heather
- Lincoln Lewis as Kyle
- Damien Garvey as Bob Colins
- Richard Brancatisano as Rory Radcliffe
- Chris Betts as Lockie
- Simon Edds as Lifeguard
- Miranda Deakin as TV Reporter
- Rhiannon Dannielle Pettett as Julie
- Skye Fellman as Young Girl
- Nicholas McCallum as Oceania Store Owner

== Production ==
Initially, Russell Mulcahy was going to direct the film; however, his involvement with the television series Teen Wolf made this impractical, and so he hired Kimble Rendall to direct instead. The film began shooting on 29 November 2011. Three animatronic sharks were used for filming. Although Rendall wanted to entirely avoid using computer-generated imagery, the budget necessitated that some scenes required its use.

== Release ==
Bait had its premiere at the Venice Film Festival where it was shown out of competition on 1 September 2012. The film was released theatrically on 20 September 2012 Australia and on 29 November 2012 in Singapore.

The film was released on DVD in Australia on 16 January 2013 without the "3D" subtitle as Bait; it was only released in 3D on Blu-ray.

== Reception ==
On the review aggregator website Rotten Tomatoes, 47% of 36 critics' reviews are positive, with an average rating of 4.7/10. The website's consensus reads: "Bait isn't entirely lacking in the shark action department, but a silly story and thinly sketched characters may leave audiences bored between bloody attacks." Margaret Pomeranz rated the film 3.5/5 stars and said it would appeal to a specific genre audience, while David Stratton rated it 2.5/5 stars and criticized the film for not investing the audience in its characters. Others, such as Jake Wilson of The Age, saw it as a film that is somewhat enjoyable on the basis of being an "awful" film.

== Related film ==
Production of a sequel called Deep Water, about a plane en route from China to Australia crashing in the Pacific Ocean, was scrapped in 2014 due to "uncomfortable similarities" to the disappearance of Malaysia Airlines Flight 370. In 2023, musician Gene Simmons and film producer Gary Hamilton co-founded Simmons/Hamilton Productions, a branch of Hamilton's production company Arclight Films; it was subsequently announced that Deep Water would be revived to serve as the company's first project and won't be connected to Bait 3D. Directed by Renny Harlin and starring Aaron Eckhart and Ben Kingsley, the film was released in May 2026.
