= Lucia Pica =

Make-up Artist

- Born: Lucia Pica; 7 June 1976 (age 49); Naples, Italy
- Occupation: Make-up artist

Lucia Pica (born 7 June 1976) is an Italian make-up artist, and currently the Creative Image and Make-up Partner for Byredo Beauty.

== Early life ==
Pica was born in Naples, Italy. At a young age, she cultivated a deep interest in art and its visual appeal.

Pica had intended to pursue a career in art conservation or psychology, but her plans took a detour when she spent two summers in London. As a result, at the age of 22 in 1999, she relocated to the British capital.

== Career ==
Pica's journey in the beauty industry began in her early 20s when she moved to London to pursue her dream of becoming a make-up artist. After enrolling in a one-month course at the Greasepaint School of Make-up in London, she gained the opportunity to work on various jobs, like doing make-up for extras in the James Bond film Die Another Day. However, she ultimately decided to pursue a career in the fashion industry instead of venturing further into the world of film. Pica scored an agent who coincidentally also worked with make-up artist Charlotte Tilbury. Determined to work with Tilbury, she consistently reached out to her agent every two weeks expressing her desire to collaborate with Tilbury. Her persistence eventually yielded results, and after a year, Pica was granted an opportunity to work on a fashion show alongside Tilbury's team. Tilbury offered her a full-time position, and within two years, Pica became Tilbury's first assistant. Following three years in her role, Pica felt the need to explore her own creative expression and began working as a freelancer. She made a conscious decision to focus on the realm of fashion, working as a make-up artist for runway shows of brands such as Peter Pilotto. Additionally, she did make-up for high-profile advertising campaigns for fashion houses like Dolce & Gabbana and Louis Vuitton. She contributed to magazine covers for publications including Vogue Paris, Self-Service, and i-D.

In 2014, Pica was appointed as the Global Creative Make-up and Color Designer for Chanel. As the Global Creative Make-up and Color Designer, Pica worked closely with the Chanel team to develop new make-up products, curate color palettes, and create beauty looks for runway shows, editorial shoots, and advertising campaigns.

In October 2021, one year after Pica had finished her contract with Chanel, Ben Gorham, the founder of Byredo, asked Pica if she would be interested in doing a project for Byredo.

In March 2022, Pica was appointed as the Creative Image and Make-up Partner for Byredo. Her first launch as the brand’s new make-up partner was a range of ten Liquid Lipsticks.

In 2023 Lucia Pica’s make-up collection for Byredo Beauty, First Emotions, won Wallpaper* Design Award 2023 for its innovative use of color.

Pica has done make-up for runway shows and advertising campaigns for clients like Chanel, Givenchy, Dior Men, Roksanda, Victoria Beckham, Emporio Armani, Gucci, Trussardi and Cerruti. Her editorial client list includes publications like Vogue, Glamour, Dazed, Another, Purple, Allure, Interview, Love, Fantastic Man and Modern Matter.

== Artistry ==
Pica's work often reflects her appreciation for color and texture, as well as her understanding of the individuality of each person's face. She is known for her ability to enhance natural beauty while embracing experimentation and pushing boundaries. Her approach to make-up combines classic techniques with a modern twist, resulting in captivating and memorable looks.

She draws inspiration from various sources, including art, fashion, and cultural influences. Her work has been praised for its ability to translate different moods and concepts into make-up, demonstrating her versatility and artistic range.
