= Cariba Heine =

Australian actress and dancer (born 1988)

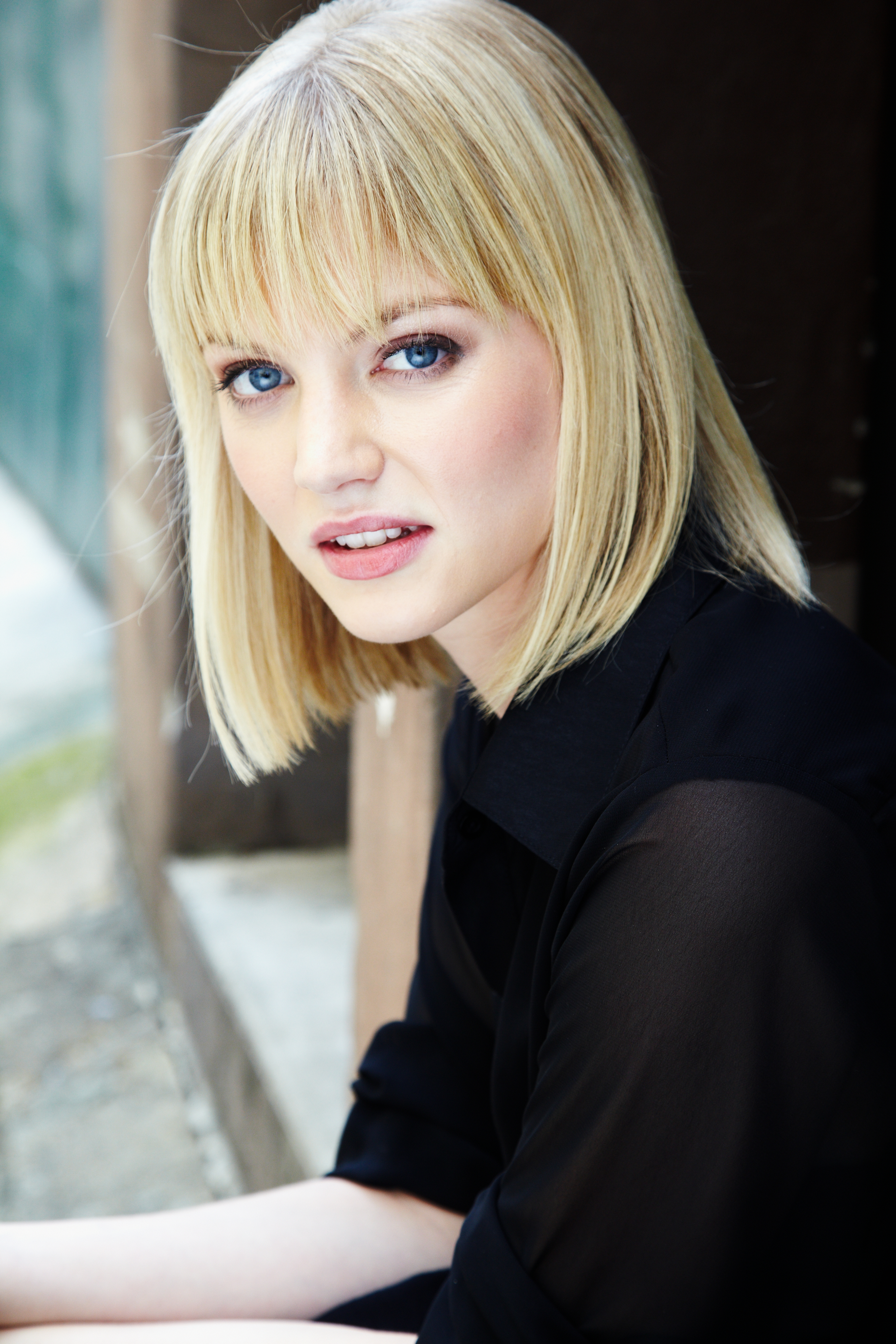
- Heine in 2012
- Born: 1 October 1988 (age 38); Johannesburg, Transvaal, South Africa
- Occupations: Actress; dancer
- Years active: 2003–present
- Spouse: Matt Pong (m. 2024)
- Children: 1

Cariba Heine (born 1 October 1988) is a South African-born Australian actress and dancer. She garnered recognition for her leading role as Rikki Chadwick in the fantasy drama series H_{2}O: Just Add Water (2006–2010) and next starred in the television series Blue Water High (2008) and Dance Academy (2010–2013). She portrayed Caroline Byrne in the true crime film A Model Daughter: The Killing of Caroline Byrne (2009) and had her feature film debut in the disaster horror film Bait 3D (2012).

Heine appeared in the music video Rough Sweat (2016) and in the television series Home and Away (2018) and The Secrets She Keeps (2020).

== Early life ==
Heine was born in Johannesburg to South African parents Michelle, a former showgirl, and Kevin Heine. She moved to Australia at the age of three with her parents and older brother Kyle (born 1985).

== Career ==
=== Dancing ===
Her early days included training in jazz dance, tap dance, classical ballet, acrobatics and rhythmic gymnastics, and studying acting and singing at National Capital Acting School. She danced at her mother's dance school in Canberra, where she later attended Telopea Park School and St Clare's College. She was the youngest dancer to perform at the Stargazers Convention in Sydney, Australia. She was homeschooled to focus on her dance career, and performed in many stage productions, including a tour in the United States, where she featured in the music video for Will Young's song "Leave Right Now". After a serious hip injury, she was suggested to temporarily turn to acting by her manager.

=== Acting ===
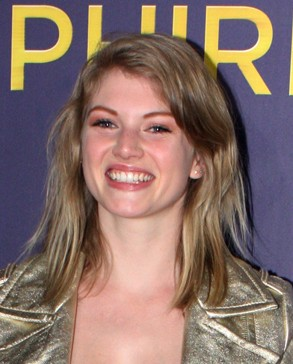
Heine in 2012

Heine began her acting career in 2006 by being cast on the television series, H_{2}O: Just Add Water, where she played Rikki Chadwick, one of the lead roles. Heine next portrayed Caroline Byrne in the television film A Model Daughter: The Killing of Caroline Byrne which was broadcast on Network Ten in Australia on 4 November 2009.

In 2011, she joined the cast of the indie film Lord of the Crows, though the film ultimately failed to get crowdfunded. In 2012, she portrayed Heather in Bait 3D, and Delvene Delaney in Channel 9's biographical TV miniseries Howzat! Kerry Packer's War. In 2016, Heine reprised her role as Rikki Chadwick in the final two episodes of the third series of Mako: Island of Secrets, a spin-off of H_{2}O: Just Add Water. The same year Heine had a starring role in the short film How'd I Get in This Field which premiered at the Massachusetts Independent Film Festival.

Heine joined the cast of Home and Away in 2018 as Ebony Harding. In 2020, she appeared in the thriller-drama series The Secrets She Keeps with Laura Carmichael and Jessica De Gouw.

== Personal life ==
Heine married her long-time boyfriend Matt Pong on 24 June 2024. On 20 December 2024, Heine announced she was expecting her first child. She gave birth to a son in 2025.

== Filmography ==
=== Film ===
Year	Title	Role	Notes
2003	Ballistic Sessions	Amanda	Short film
2009	A Model Daughter: The Killing of Caroline Byrne	Caroline Byrne	TV film
2009	At the Tattooist	Alex	Short film
2011	Blood Brothers	Ellie Carter	TV film
2012	Quietus	Alex	Short film
2012	Bait 3D	Heather	Feature film
2016	How'd I Get In This Field	Ashley	Short film
2016	Rough Sweat	June	Short film

=== Television ===
Year	Title	Role	Notes
2005	Strictly Dancing	Herself	Episode: "Heat 12"
2006–2010	H_{2}O: Just Add Water	Rikki Chadwick	TV series. 78 episodes
2007	Stupid, Stupid Man	Mindy	TV series, episode: "The Boyfriend"
2008	Blue Water High	Bridget Sanchez	TV series. Season 3, 25 episodes
2009	The Pacific	Phyllis	TV series, episode: "Home"
2010–2013	Dance Academy	Isabelle	TV series, 9 episodes
2010–2013	The Future Machine	Kate Hill	Web series
2012	Howzat! Kerry Packer's War	Delvene Delaney	TV miniseries
2014	Friendly Advice	Faith	Web series; 2 episodes
2015	Hiding	Harriet	TV series, 4 episodes
2016	Adopted	Harriet	Web series; episodes: "Music, Virgins, and Prawns", "Kofi's Choice"
2016	Mako: Island of Secrets	Rikki Chadwick	TV series, episodes: "The Legend of Jiao Long", "Homecoming"
2017	Designated Survivor	Peyton Lane	TV series, episodes: "Suckers", "Two Ships", "Family Ties"
2018	Home and Away	Ebony Harding	TV series
2020	The Secrets She Keeps	Grace	TV series, 6 episodes
2021–2026	Everyone Is Doing Great	Isabella Baker	TV series, 14 episodes
2023	Wellmania	Goldie	TV series, episode: "Carpe That Diem"

== See also ==
- Claire Holt
- Phoebe Tonkin
