= Isabel Durant =

Australian actress and dancer (born 1991)

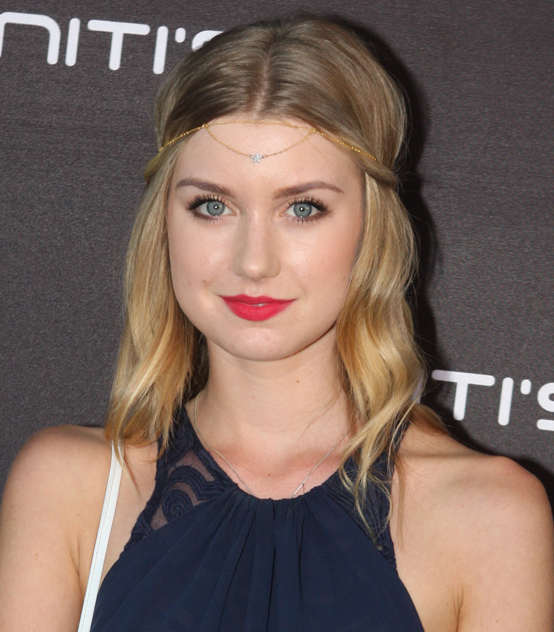
- Durant in 2013
- Born: Isabel Durant; 21 December 1991 (age 34); Sydney, New South Wales, Australia
- Occupations: Actress; dancer
- Years active: 2006–present
- Website: www.isabeldurant.com

Isabel Durant (born 21 December 1991), sometimes credited as Issi Durant, is an Australian actress and dancer. She is best known for her roles as Grace Whitney in Dance Academy (2012–2013), Ondina the mermaid in Mako: Island of Secrets (2015–2016) and Claire Brady in Days of Our Lives (2020–2021).

== Life and career ==
Durant is from Sydney, Australia. She began seriously dancing at age 15 while a student at Loreto Kirribilli.

Durant appeared on and was a Top 20 finalist on the third season of So You Think You Can Dance Australia. Following her elimination from So You Think You Can Dance Australia, she went to open auditions for the teen drama series Dance Academy and was cast in the role of troublemaker Grace Whitney for the show's second season, a role she continued playing into the series' third season. She also appeared in three episodes of American-Australian comedy-drama television series Camp which aired on NBC in 2013.

In 2014, Durant joined the cast of Mako: Island of Secrets with its second season, playing mermaid Ondina, staying on with the show through its third season. In August 2020, it was announced that Durant had joined the cast of American soap opera Days of Our Lives, taking over the recurring role of Claire Brady. On September 10, 2020, she was promoted to a contract player.

== Filmography ==
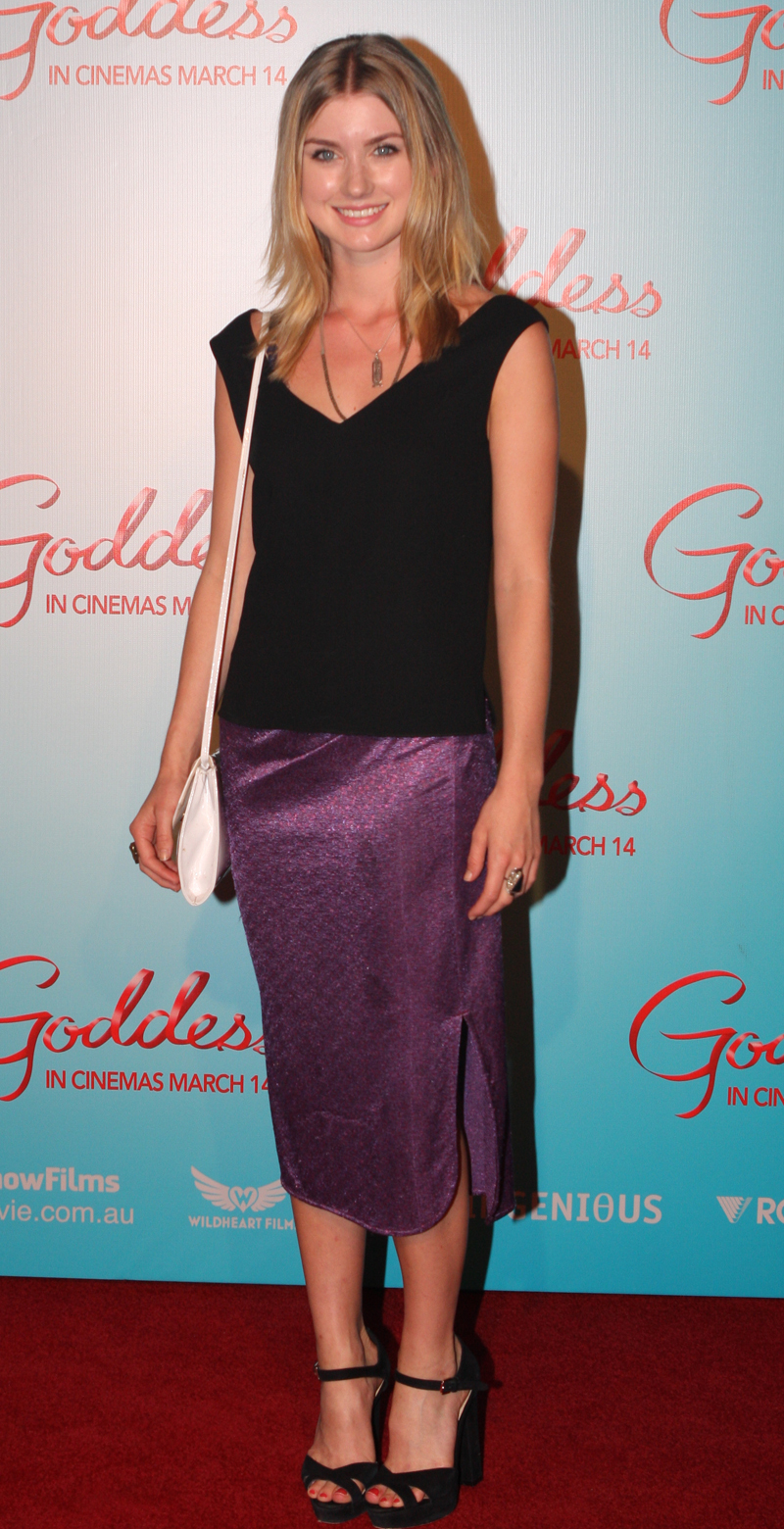
Durant in March 2013

Film and television roles
Year	Title	Role	Notes
2007	Razzle Dazzle: A Journey into Dance	Miss Elizabeth's Dance Troupe	Film
2010	So You Think You Can Dance Australia	Herself	Contestant (season 3); as Issi Durant
2012–2013	Dance Academy	Grace Whitney	Main role (seasons 2–3), 39 episodes; credited as Issi Durant during season 2
2013	Reef Doctors	Emma	Episodes 1.3, 1.12
2013	Camp	Deanna	Episodes: "Capture the Flag", "The Mixer", "CIT Overnight"
2015–2016	Mako: Island of Secrets	Ondina	Main role (seasons 2–3)
2017	This is Us	Kelly	Episode: "Number One"
2018	Life Itself	Shari Dickstein	Film
2020–2021	Days of Our Lives	Claire Brady	Contract role
