= The Lost Soldier =

The Lost Soldier may refer to:

- The Chinese Widow, a 2018 film released in France under the title The Lost Soldier
- Texas Rising: The Lost Soldier, a 2015 miniseries with Christopher Sommers

== See also ==
- Lost Soldier, racehorse who won the 1995 and 1996 Godolphin Mile
- For a Lost Soldier, a 1992 Dutch film
