= Christopher Sommers =

Irish-born actor

Christopher Grantley Sommers (born 30 June 1977) is an Irish-born actor who moved to Australia.

== Education ==
He received a Bachelor of Fine Arts (acting) from the Queensland University of Technology (2000–2002). He undertook master classes at the 16th Street Studio (Melbourne) in 2012 with Ellen Burstyn, 2014 with Carl Ford and with Larry Moss in 2014 and 2016. He also attended a master class with Ivana Chubbuch in Los Angeles in 2016.

== Acting career ==
While undertaking his degree Sommers acted in several stage productions, starting in 2001 in Uncle Vanya. Following his graduation he acted with several major companies mainly in Queensland although he did travel interstate with touring productions.

His first role was in a short film, The Machine, in 2002 and he has since appeared in short film, television series and feature films.

He has worked with Russell Crowe in The Water Diviner (2014), with Ethan Hawke and Sarah Snook in Predestination (2014) and John Cusack in Drive Hard (2014). Sommers stars in a feature film a zombie western Bullets for the Dead (set for release 2016) the first film for a joint venture between a Brisbane-based Cathartic Pictures and UK sales agent Stealth Media Group. It is intended to film a number of low budget genre films to be sold internationally.

Sommers has played diverse characters including a scientist, a bush bashing yokel, a soldier and comedy and says that growing older and changing your appearance allows you to play different roles. Sommers also plays a magical halfling professor in the series "The Bureau of Magical Things".

== Teaching ==
Sommers is a co-creator of the 21 Day Actors Challenge. Together with Angela Olyslager and Tanya Schneider they have put together a program to assist actors. The program is online and it includes acting exercises that will help participant be better prepared for stage and film roles. They also run Weekend Workshops.

== Reviews ==
A review by ABC Radio of the 2010 production of Fat Pig at the Bille Brown Studio, Brisbane, described him as "the always interesting Christopher Sommers", adding "In fact all performances were of the very highest quality. Sommers was likewise wonderfully sensitive".

Of the production of Beautiful (2008), the review in Stagediary stated:

... Christopher Sommers, as the mysterious almost sinister left-behind school friend, is the best example of this, and his triumph in this performance is to make his character almost seem like a bad actor who hasn’t learned his lines, until we notice the utter control he has over his movement and his voice. Stage presence doesn’t have to shout “Look at me acting!” – in this case, it’s all done by understatement.

Nathanael Cooper, in the Courier Mail review of Orphans (2011), wrote of Sommers:

The play is not easy to watch. It is troubling and harrowing and one particular scene sees Christopher Sommers absolutely own the audience as he describes, in gruesome detail, some of the darkest sides of life.

== Awards ==
2006 Matilda Awards Emerging Artist

2010 Matilda Awards nominated Best Male Actor in a Leading Role

== Filmography ==
=== Film ===
Year	Title	Role	Notes
2002	The Machine	Scarred Man	Short film
2007	Counter	James Dalton	Short film
2007	Unfinished Sky	Mike Potter	
2007	All My Friends Are Leaving Brisbane	Kane/Negative Man	
2008	The Horseman	Pauly	
2008	The Prams	Earl	Short film
2010	Jucy	Nate	
2011	Attached	Michael	Short film
2012	Silver Stilletto	Trevor Fenton	Short film
2012	Jacob Fights Giants	Neil Rockford	Short film
2013	Cough	Brett	Short film
2014	Predestination	Mr. Miller	
2014	Sailboats	Adam	Short film
2014	Ouroboros	Linden Connor	Short film
2014	Drive Hard	Gas Station Attendant	
2014	Letter to Annabelle	James	Short film
2014	The Water Diviner	Tucker	
2014	Inverse	John	Short film
2014	Power State	Martin Andrews	Short film
2015	The Fear of Darkness	Detective Constable Gardiner	
2015	Actor's Apocalypse	Social Services Officer	Short film
2015	The Girlfriend	Steve	Short film
2015	Bullets for the Dead	James Dalton	
2015	Brothers	Police Officer	Short film
2016	The Insect & the Alien	Owen	Short film
2017	Emporium	Kent	Short film
2017	Australia Day	Desk Sergeant	
2017	Slaughter at Lonesome Rock	Sergeant Matthew Cooper	Short film
2018	A Picture of Other People	Paramedic	Short film
2019	A Guide to Dating at the End of the World	Ken	
2019	Danger Close: The Battle of Long Tan	Group Captain Peter Raw	
2019	Burden	The Man	Short film
2022	Elvis	Horace Logan	
2023	The Portable Door	Arthur Tanner	

=== Television ===
Year	Title	Role	Notes
2004	Love Bytes	Neal	4 episode
2006	Monarch Cove	Mechanic	Episode: "Episode 11"
2007	The Starter Wife	Clarity Harbor Staffer #2	Episode: "Hour 3"; miniseries
2008	The Strip	Barry Barrington	Episode: "House of Ill Repute"
2011	Sea Patrol	Jason Merritt	Episode: "Dead Zone"
2011	Terra Nova	Earl	Episode: "Genesis: Part 1"
2012	Fatal Honeymoon	Inmate 1	Television film
2013	Reef Doctors	Liam	Episode: "Episode 5"
2014	Parer's War	Dr. Bill McLean	Television film
2015	Texas Rising: The Lost Soldier	Settler	Episode: "Chapter 1"; miniseries
2015	Mako: Island of Secrets	Mr. Johnson	Episode: "The Siren"
2016	Wanted	Dirk	Episode: "Detour"
2016	Hunters	Sterling Martinez	2 episodes
2017	Dirty, Clean & Inbetween	James	Television pilot
2018	Harrow	Detective Leichhardt	2 episodes
2018–2021	The Bureau of Magical Things	Professor Maxwell	Main role; 40 episodes
2019	Secret City: Under the Eagle	John Smith	Episode: "Broken Bird"
2019	Nevernight	Hangman	Main role; miniseries
2020	The End	Beau	2 episodes
2021	Sweet Tooth	Spaghetti	Episode: "Out of the Deep Woods"
2021	Interface	Lucian	5 episodes

== Theatre ==
Christopher Sommers as actor unless otherwise stated

Year	Title	Venue	Year	Title	Venue
2001	Uncle Vanya	QUT Gardens Theatre, Brisbane	2001 (25 Oct-23 Nov)	The Merchant of Venice	QUT Gardens Theatre, Brisbane
2002	Song of the Yellow Bittern	QUT Gardens Theatre, Brisbane	2002 (7-23 Mar)	The Jungle	Woodward Theatre, Kelvin Grove
2002 (23 May - 1 Jun)	Building The Wall	QUT Gardens Theatre, Brisbane	2003 (10 -13 Dec)	Stained	Darlinghurst Theatre, Darlinghurst
2004 (24 May-26 Jun)	Proof	Cremorne Theatre, South Brisbane	2004 (3-5 Nov)	Sleeping Around	Belvoir Street Downstairs Theatre, Surry Hills
2005	The Oracle	Brisbane Powerhouse, New Farm	2005 (8 -13 Feb)	Trance	Newtown Theatre, Newtown
2005 (Apr-Aug)	Zigzag Street	Touring Qld, NT, NSW, WA, Vic	2006	Trivia	Metro Arts, Brisbane
2006 (24 Jan -4 Feb)	Omon Ra	Brisbane Powerhouse, New Farm	2006 (8 May)	Hoods	The Studio (Sydney Opera House),
2007 (8-18 Aug)	Closer	Sue Benner Theatre, Brisbane	2007 (23 Oct-3 Nov)	The Laramie Project	Visy Theatre, New Farm
2008 (Apr/May)	Hoods	NSW, Qld, SA	2008 (22 - 23 May)	The People Next Door	Metro Arts Studio, Brisbane
2008 (26 Nov-6 Dec)	Anatomy Titus Fall of Rome	Merlyn Theatre, Southbank	2008 (29 Nov-8 Dec)	Beautiful	The Loft, Kelvin Grove
2009 (18 Mar-4Apr)	The Pillowman (Producer)	Sue Benner Theatre, Brisbane	2009 (13-22 May)	The Exception and the Rule	Bille Brown Studio, Brisbane
2009 (Jul/Aug)	The School of Arts	Touring Qld	2009 (18-20 Sep)	My Night with Harold (Assistant Director)	Metro Arts Warehouse, Brisbane
2009 (26 Oct-14 Nov)	The Crucible	Playhouse, Southbank, Brisbane	2010 (6 Feb-14 Mar)	Hamlet	Roundhouse Theatre, Kelvin Grove
2010 (7-25 Apr)	Blackbird (Producer)	Roundhouse Theatre, Kelvin Grove	2010 (31 May-26 Jun)	Fat Pig	Bille Brown Studio, Brisbane
2011 (6-23 Apr)	The Ugly One (Assistant Director/Producer)	Metro Art Galleries	2011 (23 Jun-9 Jul)	Orphans	Bille Brown Studio, Brisbane
2011 (7-27 Nov)	Pygmalion	Playhouse, Southbank			
