= The Bureau of Magical Things =

Australian television series

- Genre: Drama
- Created by: Jonathan M. Shiff
- Developed by: Jonathan M. Shiff; Mark Shirrefs
- Directed by: Grant Brown; Evan Clarry; Martha Goddard
- Starring: Kimie Tsukakoshi; Elizabeth Cullen; Mia Milnes; Julian Cullen; Rainbow Wedell; Jamie Carter; Christopher Sommers
- Opening theme: Brett Aplin
- Ending theme: Brett Aplin
- Composers: Ricky Edwards & Brett Aplin
- Country of origin: Australia
- Original language: English
- No. of seasons: 2
- No. of episodes: 40

Production
- Executive producers: Jonathan M. Shiff; Julia Adams; Nicole Keeb; Arne Lohmann; Cherrie Bottger; Drew Jarvis
- Producers: Jonathan M. Shiff; Stuart Wood
- Cinematography: Andrew Conder
- Camera setup: Single-camera
- Running time: 30 minutes (S1); 24 minutes (S2)
- Production company: Jonathan M. Shiff Productions

Original release
- Network: Eleven; 10 Shake
- Release: 8 July 2018 – 8 August 2021

The Bureau of Magical Things is an Australian drama television series created by Jonathan M. Shiff and developed by Jonathan M. Shiff and Mark Shirrefs that premiered in Australia on Eleven on 8 July 2018, and aired through 2 November 2018. In the United States, the series debuted on Nickelodeon on 8 October 2018; it later moved to TeenNick where it was broadcast from 15 October to 8 November 2018. The series stars Kimie Tsukakoshi, Elizabeth Cullen, Mia Milnes, Julian Cullen, Rainbow Wedell, Jamie Carter, and Christopher Sommers. The Bureau of Magical Things was renewed for a second season in November 2019, which premiered on 10 July 2021 on 10 Shake, and aired through 8 August 2021.

== Premise ==
The human and magic worlds co-existed in harmony, but as technology advanced, the magic world was pushed back, and fairies and other magical creatures became endangered species. Now, someone wants to change that and restore magic to its rightful place. When Kyra uncovers a threat to both the human and magic worlds, she must try to unite humans, elves, and fairies in order to save them all. The Bureau must solve the mystery of who the enigmatic figure is and how they will achieve their goal. The investigation leads them to uncover secrets in both the human and magic worlds that no one could have imagined.

== Cast and characters ==
=== Main ===
- Kimie Tsukakoshi as Kyra Glen, a teenage girl whose life is changed after an encounter with a magic book is thought to have transformed her into a "triling": part human, part fairy and part elf. While wary of her new circumstances, she is learning to accept her new reality.
- Elizabeth Cullen as Imogen Blackwell, an elf training to become a member of the Department of Magical Intervention (DMI). Although serious about her training, she does not believe in teamwork. At first quite wary of Kyra, she begins to soften to her.
- Mia Milnes as Lily Regan, a fairy training to become a member of the DMI. She is friendly, with a bubbly personality, and quickly warms to Kyra.
- Julian Cullen as Darra Blackwell, Imogen's brother, an elf training to become a member of the DMI. Compared to his sister, he is more friendly and less serious about his studies.
- Rainbow Wedell as Ruksy Tavola, a fairy training to become a member of the DMI. Like Lily, she is friendly, but she is also much more serious.
- Jamie Carter as Peter, Kyra's friend. He loves comics and is very suspicious of the magical phenomena that occur around him.
- Christopher Sommers as Professor Maxwell, a bookstore owner and teacher of magic for the DMI. He is a halfling: half human and half elf. He cares greatly for his students and wants them to reach their full magical potential.

=== Recurring ===
- Arnijka Larcombe-Weate as Mathilda Brennan, Kyra's best friend and fellow basketball player who doesn't know of Kyra's magical powers.
- Steve Nation as Steve Glen, Kyra's stepfather and a local police officer who is also unaware of Kyra's powers.
- Melanie Zanetti as Orla (season 1), an elf who's one of the DMI's top agents and Imogen's idol who poses as a reporter. She is an old acquaintance of Maxwell's and apparently has her own agenda involving Kyra.
- Nicholas Bell as Sean Regan, Lily's father and the Director of Magic.
- Miah Madden as Tayla (season 2), a mysterious fairy who is a new student at River City High School and works at the Gangway café.
- Matthew Manahan as Ben (season 2), a musician whom Lily has a crush on.
- Tasneem Roc as Dr Apinya Surinat (season 2), an old associate of Professor Maxwell's who takes his place when he is forced to step aside. The trainees, especially Kyra, soon find reason to be suspicious of her.

== Production ==
On 17 July 2017, it was announced that a new children's series was to film in Queensland from producer Jonathan M. Shiff (H_{2}O: Just Add Water, Mako: Island of Secrets, Thunderstone, Ocean Girl, Horace and Tina). The 20-episode series started filming in July 2017, in Gold Coast, Brisbane, and Arundel, ending in December 2017. Starring in the series are Kimie Tsukakoshi, Elizabeth Cullen, Julian Cullen, Mia Milnes, Rainbow Wedell, Jamie Carter, Nicholas Bell, Christopher Sommers, Steve Nation, and Melanie Zanetti. Jonathan M. Shiff served as executive producer and producer, Julia Adams serves as executive producer, and Stuart Wood as producer. The series was written by Mark Shirrefs, while Evan Clarry and Grant Brown directed. The series aired in Australia on Eleven. On 22 September 2018, Nickelodeon acquired the rights to the series and announced that the series would premiere in the United States on 8 October 2018.

On 27 November 2019, it was announced that a second season of the series would be produced, with production to take place between December 2019 and July 2020 in Gold Coast, Queensland, Australia. The series cast, including Kimie Tsukakoshi, returned. Production on the series was shut down, in March 2020, due to the COVID-19 pandemic.

== Episodes ==
Series	Episodes	Originally released	
Series	Episodes	First released	Last released
1	20	8 July 2018	2 November 2018
2	20	10 July 2021	8 August 2021

=== Series 1 (2018) ===
No. overall	No. in series	Title	Directed by	Written by	Australian air date	U.S. air date	Prod. code	U.S. viewers; (millions)
1	1	"Magical Mishaps"	Grant Brown	Evan Clarry	8 July 2018	8 October 2018	101	0.66
Guest stars: Arnijka Larcombe-Weate as Mathilda, Steve Nation as Steve, Amy Raffe as Helen, Rumi Kikuchi as Michiko Songs featured: "Wouldn't It Be?" performed by Kimie Tsukakoshi, "Can't Let Go", performed by Ruby Dacy
2	2	"Magic in the Air"	Grant Brown	Chris Anastassiades	15 July 2018	9 October 2018	102	0.75
Guest star: Steve Nation as Steve
3	3	"All the World's a Stage"	Grant Brown	Alexa Wyatt & Mark Shirrefs	22 July 2018	10 October 2018	103	0.62
Guest stars: Arnijka Larcombe-Weate as Mathilda, Steve Nation as Steve, Melanie Zanetti as Orla Absent: Christopher Sommers as Professor Maxwell
4	4	"Gone to the Dogs"	Grant Brown	Li-Kim Chuah	29 July 2018	11 October 2018	104	0.68
Guest stars: Arnijka Larcombe-Weate as Mathilda, Steve Nation as Steve, Penny Everingham as Mrs. Spencer
5	5	"A Knight to Remember"	Grant Brown	Anthony Morris	5 August 2018	15 October 2018	105	0.07
Guest stars: Steve Nation as Steve, Melanie Zanetti as Orla, Arnijka Larcombe-Weate as Mathilda, Javan Barnard as Leo, Ava Taylor as Callie, Nicholas Bell as Sean
6	6	"The Test"	Grant Brown	Michelle Law	12 August 2018	16 October 2018	106	0.12
Guest stars: Steve Nation as Steve, Melanie Zanetti as Orla, Arnijka Larcombe-Weate as Mathilda
7	7	"Fairy for a Day"	Grant Brown	Sam Carroll	19 August 2018	17 October 2018	107	0.10
Guest stars: Steve Nation as Steve, Charlotte Stent as Sally, Jacy Lewis as Dawn Absent: Jamie Carter as Peter
8	8	"Shortcut"	Grant Brown	Evan Clarry	26 August 2018	18 October 2018	108	0.12
Guest stars: Steve Nation as Steve, Melanie Zanetti as Orla, Arnijka Larcombe-Weate as Mathilda, Amy Raffe as Helen
9	9	"On the Beach"	Grant Brown	Mark Shirrefs & Alex Wyatt	2 September 2018	22 October 2018	109	0.10
10	10	"Uncharted Waters"	Grant Brown	Chris Anastassiades	9 September 2018	23 October 2018	110	0.07
Guest stars: Melanie Zanetti as Orla, Arnijka Larcombe-Weate as Mathilda, Steven Lunavich as Trevor, Nicholas Bell as Sean
11	11	"A Fairy Tale"	Evan Clarry	Evan Clarry	16 September 2018	24 October 2018	111	0.10
Guest stars: Steve Nation as Steve, John Manning as Cedric, Sam Cotton as Silas, Cleo Massey as Sophie Absent: Christopher Sommers as Professor Maxwell
12	12	"Aisle 13"	Evan Clarry	Vicki Englund	23 September 2018	25 October 2018	112	0.08
Guest stars: Arnijka Larcombe-Weate as Mathilda, Steve Nation as Steve
13	13	"Forces of Attraction"	Evan Clarry	Sam Carroll	30 September 2018	29 October 2018	113	0.10
Guest stars: Arnijka Larcombe-Weate as Mathilda, Steve Nation as Steve, Nicholas Bell as Sean
14	14	"The Eye of Horus"	Evan Clarry	Evan Clarry	7 October 2018	30 October 2018	114	0.10
Guest stars: Melanie Zanetti as Orla, Candice Flanagan as Giselle, Nicholas Bell as Sean Absent: Jamie Carter as Peter
15	15	"Judgment Day"	Evan Clarry	Sam Carroll	14 October 2018	31 October 2018	115	0.03
Guest stars: Steve Nation as Steve, Melanie Zanetti as Orla, Samantha Fitzgerald as Ella, Cameron Caulfield as Nate, Charlie Dunn as Jack, Nicholas Bell as Sean
16	16	"Prize Day"	Evan Clarry	Alexa Wyatt	21 October 2018	1 November 2018	116	0.09
Guest stars: Steve Nation as Steve, Melanie Zanetti as Orla, Samantha Fitzgerald as Ella, Paul Bishop as Jared, Rumi Kikuchi as Michiko, Priyanka Das as Neisha, Parker Little as Gerard, Norma Leaver as Mrs. Crowther, Nicholas Bell as Sean
17	17	"Accused"	Evan Clarry	Vicki Englund	28 October 2018	5 November 2018	117	0.09
Guest stars: Steve Nation as Steve, Melanie Zanetti as Orla, Steven Lunavich as Trevor, Nicholas Bell as Sean
18	18	"On the Case"	Evan Clarry	Vicki Englund	1 November 2018	6 November 2018	118	0.10
Guest stars: Steve Nation as Steve, Melanie Zanetti as Orla, Nicholas Bell as Sean
19	19	"End of the Road: Part 1"	Evan Clarry	Mark Shirrefs	2 November 2018	7 November 2018	119	0.08
Guest stars: Arnijka Larcombe-Weate as Mathilda, Steve Nation as Steve, Melanie Zanetti as Orla, Paul Bishop as Jared, Nicholas Bell as Sean
20	20	"End of the Road: Part 2"	Evan Clarry	Vicki Englund & Mark Shirrefs	2 November 2018	8 November 2018	120	0.10
Guest stars: Steve Nation as Steve, Melanie Zanetti as Orla, Paul Bishop as Jared, Steven Lunavich as Trevor, Nicholas Bell as Sean

=== Series 2 (2021) ===
No. overall	No. in series	Title	Directed by	Written by	Australian air date	U.S. air date	Prod. code	U.S. viewers; (millions)
21	1	"Vanished"	Evan Clarry	Mark Shirrefs	10 July 2021	TBA	TBA	TBA
Guest stars: Steve Nation as Steve, Carly Rees as Mace, Malachi Waters as elf guard, Kenji Shimada as Kazuhiro, Nicholas Bell as Sean Songs featured: "The Light" performed by Kimie Tsukakoshi
22	2	"A Dangerous Secret"	Evan Clarry	Evan Clarry	10 July 2021	TBA	TBA	TBA
Guest stars: Miah Madden as Tayla, Paul Bishop as Jared, Penny Everingham as Mrs. Spencer, Carly Rees as Mace, Malachi Waters as elf guard, Kenji Shimada as Kazuhiro, Kenneth Moraleda as Mr. Mendoza
23	3	"Fortuna's Compact"	Evan Clarry	Charlie Strachan & Alexa Wyatt	11 July 2021	TBA	TBA	TBA
Guest stars: Miah Madden as Tayla, Matthew Manahan as Ben Reid, Arnijka Larcombe-Weate as Mathilda, Laura Kenneally as Ms Rayner, Emily Bell as Sharon Songs featured: "Standing By Myself" and "This Is Me" performed by Matthew Manahan
24	4	"The Big Sneeze"	Evan Clarry	Vicki Englund	11 July 2021	TBA	TBA	TBA
Guest Stars: Miah Madden as Tayla, Arnijka Larcombe-Weate as Mathilda
25	5	"Welcome to the Jungle"	Evan Clarry	Sam Carroll	17 July 2021	TBA	TBA	TBA
Guest stars: Miah Madden as Tayla, Paula Nazarski as Mrs. Devlin, Anthony Standish as Magnus Sorenson, Samantha Fitzgerald as Ella, Kenneth Moraleda as Mr. Mendoza, Carly Rees as Mace, Kenji Shimada as Kazuhiro, Malachi Waters as elf guard
26	6	"Mirror Image"	Evan Clarry	Evan Clarry	17 July 2021	TBA	TBA	TBA
Guest stars: Steve Nation as Steve, Miah Madden as Tayla, Alisha Geary as Tayla Double
27	7	"Testing Times"	Martha Goddard	Phil Enchelmaier	18 July 2021	TBA	TBA	TBA
Guest stars: Miah Madden as Tayla, Arnijka Larcombe-Weate as Mathilda, Laura Kenneally as Ms Rayner, Dorian Djoudi as Anton Krasnarsky
28	8	"Almost Famous"	Evan Clarry	Evan Clarry	18 July 2021	TBA	TBA	TBA
Guest stars: Matthew Manahan as Ben Reid, Miah Madden as Tayla, Arnijka Larcombe-Weate as Mathilda, Steve Nation as Steve Songs featured: "Hey Baby" performed by Matthew Manahan, "Ben Is Brilliant" performed by Kimie Tsukakoshi and Julian Cullen (reprise performed by Kimie Tsukakoshi, Arnijka Larcombe-Weate and Miah Madden), "Can't Get Ben Off My Mind" performed by Elizabeth Cullen and Julian Cullen, "Peter's Rap" performed by Jamie Carter, "Amazing as Benjamin" performed by Christopher Sommers, Rainbow Wendell, Elizabeth Cullen and Julian Cullen, "Sea Shanty Song" performed by Christopher Sommers, "The Magic in Me" performed by Kimie Tsukakoshi and Matthew Manhan
29	9	"The Key to the Past"	Evan Clarry	Sam Carroll	24 July 2021	TBA	TBA	TBA
Guest stars: Anthony Standish as Magnus Sorenson, Paul Bishop as Jared, Samantha Fitzgerald as Ella, Freya Toynton as Rusky's mum, Craig Gilford as Rusky's dad
30	10	"The Message"	Evan Clarry	John Thomson	24 July 2021	TBA	TBA	TBA
Guest stars: Miah Madden as Tayla, Matthew Manahan as Ben Reid, Anthony Standish as Magnus Sorenson, Kenneth Moraleda as Mr. Mendoza, Kenji Shimada as Kazuhiro
31	11	"The Enchanted Wood"	Grant Brown	Evan Clarry	25 July 2021	TBA	TBA	TBA
Guest stars: Tasneem Roc as Dr. Apinya Surinat, Nicholas Bell as Sean, Chloe De Los Santos as the princess, John Manning as Cedric, Cameron Hurry as Hugo
32	12	"Liar, Liar"	Grant Brown	Evan Clarry	25 July 2021	TBA	TBA	TBA
Guest stars: Tasneem Roc as Dr. Apinya Surinat, Matthew Manahan as Ben Reid, Nicholas Bell as Sean Songs featured: Never Let Go performed by Matthew Manahan
33	13	"Let the Games Begin"	Grant Brown	Alexa Wyatt	31 July 2021	TBA	TBA	TBA
Guest stars: Tasneem Roc as Dr. Apinya Surinat, Paul Bishop as Jared, Agnes Mohan as Camilla, Priyanka Das as Neisha, Parker Little as Gerard, Nicholas Bell as Sean
34	14	"New Tricks"	Grant Brown	Phil Enchelmaier	31 July 2021	TBA	TBA	TBA
Guest stars: Miah Madden as Tayla, Tasneem Roc as Dr. Apinya Surinat, Madison Haley as Sophie
35	15	"Party Time"	Grant Brown	Gina Roncoli	1 August 2021	TBA	TBA	TBA
Guest stars: Miah Madden as Tayla, Tasneem Roc as Dr. Apinya Surinat, Arnijka Larcombe-Weate as Mathilda, Matthew Manahan as Ben Reid, Steve Nation as Steve, Carolyn Dante as Chrissy Brennan Songs featured: "Tell Me" performed by Ruby Dacy, "Just Dance" performed by Matthew Manahan
36	16	"Revelations"	Grant Brown	Vicki Englund	1 August 2021	TBA	TBA	TBA
Darra asks Kyra on a date, they decide to keep it low-key to keep it secret from Imogen and Kyra invites Darra over for Sunday lunch with her dad. They discover in Kyra's family history albums a Tri-ling pendant which is only worn by high-ranking members of the Tri-ling council; they find out that this pendant was given to Kyra's mum from Kyra's biological father who is the source of Kyra's Tri-ling nature. Imogen starts to get very suspicious of Apinya, due to the Incodent with the Swarm attack in the library. Lily and Imogen decide to mention to Apinya about a 'Vision' of Kyra's telling her where the third key is, Apinya leaves immediately followed covertly by Imogen, who teleports to the warehouse in Singapore where Apinya tells the people there the location of the third key from Kyra's 'Vision' which she has deciphered, and Apinya and her accomplice immediately set off to the temples of Mount Fanjing in China where they believe the key is located. Guest stars: Miah Madden as Tayla, Tasneem Roc as Dr. Apinya Surinat, Steve Nation as Steve, Kenneth Moraleda as Mr. Mendoza, Nicholas Bell as Sean
37	17	"The Heist"	Grant Brown	Sam Carroll	7 August 2021	TBA	TBA	TBA
This episode starts with Imogen informing the Bureau of Apinya's cult and that they are after the 3 keys for to the temple of the Purple Lotus. They decide to tell Professor Maxwell about Apinya's deception and though initially not believing he eventually comes around. Kyra decides to give looking for the third key another chance and manages to find it ironically hidden in a painting called 'The Purple Lotus By Midnight' by Magnus Sorenson and is located inside Apinya's cult's base of operations. The Cult start to get the feeling they are on the wrong track with the information that Apinya gave to them about the third key's location so decide to kidnap Professor Maxwell and take the 2 keys that are in his possession. The Bureau decide to go to the cult base and take the painting containing the key and also rescue the 2 other keys and the professor. Initially, this goes well Kyra and Imogen find the painting and transport it to safety and start using merge magic to locate the key. The rest of the Bureau are caught by Apinya and other cult members. When Lily goes to her father to explain everything to him (which was the plan if anything went wrong) Apinya and the 2 keys are already there, Apinya then explains she is part of a super-secret DMI task force whose mission is to protect the world from the most serious threats. Wondering where Kyra is Apinya goes to where Imogen and Kyra have successfully attained the third key and before Apinya can stop Kyra from touching the key Kyra is teleported away to the temple of the purple lotus along with the other 2 keys which activate the cobra statue present there. The cobra takes all of Kyra's orb magic and fully activates just as Apinya locates her Guest stars: Miah Madden as Tayla, Tasneem Roc as Dr. Apinya Surinat, Kenneth Moraleda as Mr. Mendoza, Kenji Shimada as Kazuhiro, Malachi Waters as elf guard, Sami Afuni as fairy guard, Nicholas Bell as Sean
38	18	"Beginning of the End"	Grant Brown	Alexa Wyatt	7 August 2021	TBA	TBA	TBA
With the cobra activated it is slowly activating to its full power. In the interim fairy and elf magic starts to become unpredictable not working as expected or involuntary spell casting. Kyra has to clean up some of the magical issues as her magic seems unaffected. Professor Maxwell is reinstated at his school the class and Ladder are happy to have him return to his position as their teacher. While in the library Darra, Imogen and Lily notice their magic has started to cast spells randomly with no way for them to control it. Kyra's magic seems unaffected and she helps clean up some of the damage in the library Apinya comes up with the idea for Kyra to take back the orb magic taken from her by the cobra, but when trying to convince Kyra she reveals she also has information related to her father. Like the fact he was the one who tipped off the DMI to the location of the orb before the tri-ling council could acquire it, this makes Kyra even more adverse to help due to a lack of trust. Kyra reluctantly decides to help Apinya due to her friends having no faith in their magic as well as to keep the magical world a secret as the secret is starting to be revealed Guest stars: Miah Madden as Tayla, Tasneem Roc as Dr. Apinya Surinat, Steve Nation as Steve, Kenneth Moraleda as Mr. Mendoza, Kenji Shimada as Kazuhiro, Scott George as Anton Krasnarsky, Malachi Waters as elf guard, Nicholas Bell as Sean
39	19	"A Desperate Plan"	Grant Brown	Alexa Wyatt	8 August 2021	TBA	TBA	TBA
After Kyra's unsuccessful attempt to retrieve her orb magic from the Temple of the Purple Lotus, it becomes clear that the Purple Lotus is now stealing magic from both Elves and Faries. Even stealing Fairy dust from the books in Professor Maxwell's Library. As a result, the non-magical world is very much aware that magic now exists Desperate for knowledge on how the temple works they notice what seems to be a set of plans for the temple in a picture next to Magnus Sorenson in a Tri-ling Fundraising convention in Singapore 1919. Kyra, Peter, Imogen and Darra travel back to the time and place of the convention, posing as guests. When an attempt to acquire the information they require goes wrong Kyra is recognised from the time she stole Magnus's Journal and is brought before Magnus and the entire room of tri-lings. Kyra then exposes Darra and Imogen as elves and offers to take Magnus to find the Orb of Lemuria Guests stars: Tasneem Roc as Dr. Apinya Surinat, Anthony Standish as Magnus Sorenson, Steve Nation as Steve, Paul Bishop as Jared, Kenji Shimada as Kazuhiro, Nicholas Bell as Sean
40	20	"No More Secrets"	Grant Brown	Mark Shirrefs	8 August 2021	TBA	TBA	TBA
Still stuck in the past Kyra manages to give Peter the time artifact so he can return to the future. Peter returns with Lilly and Rusky and they are able to return with the Bureau back to the present day with the plans to the temple. With all magical attempts to destroy the Purple Lotus being a failure but even with the temple plans the DMI is unable to get any information on how to destroy the Lotus. Kyra on reading the plans has an idea that only a Tri-ling can destroy the Lotus by placing themselves inside the Lotus itself. The Bureau uses the last of its magic to protect Kyra from the Cobra while she enacts her plan. The Lotus and cobra both get destroyed by Kyra who is completely unharmed by the plan and has her orb magic completely restored, with the destruction of the Lotus all magic is returned to the world. The world though has seen too much magic to mind wipe so the DMI once again allows the complete exposure of their world allowing Magical and non-magical people to mix Guest stars: Miah Madden as Tayla, Tasneem Roc as Dr. Apinya Surinat, Anthony Standish as Magnus Sorenson, Steve Nation as Steve, Paul Bishop as Jared, Kenneth Moraleda as Mr. Mendoza, Arnijka Larcombe-Weate as Mathilda, Matthew Manahan as Ben, Kenji Shimada as Kazuhiro, Nicholas Bell as Sean

== International broadcasts ==
Country	Network	Language	Title
Sri Lanka	TV Derana	Dubbed in Sinhalese	"ඉන්ද්‍රජාල කුමරියෝ" (indrajāla kumariyō), lit. 'Warlock princesses'

== U.S. ratings ==
Viewership and ratings per season of The Bureau of Magical Things
Season	Episodes	First aired		Last aired		Avg. viewers (millions)	18–49 rank
Season	Episodes	Date	Viewers (millions)	Date	Viewers (millions)	Avg. viewers (millions)	18–49 rank
1	20	8 October 2018	0.66	8 November 2018	0.10	0.21	TBD
2	20	2021	TBD	TBA	TBD	TBD	TBD

== Awards and nominations ==
Year	Award	Category	Nominee(s)	Result	Ref.
2022	Screen Music Awards	Best Music for Children's Programming	Brett Aplin	Nominated	
