= School Spirits (2023 TV series) =

2023 American supernatural drama television series

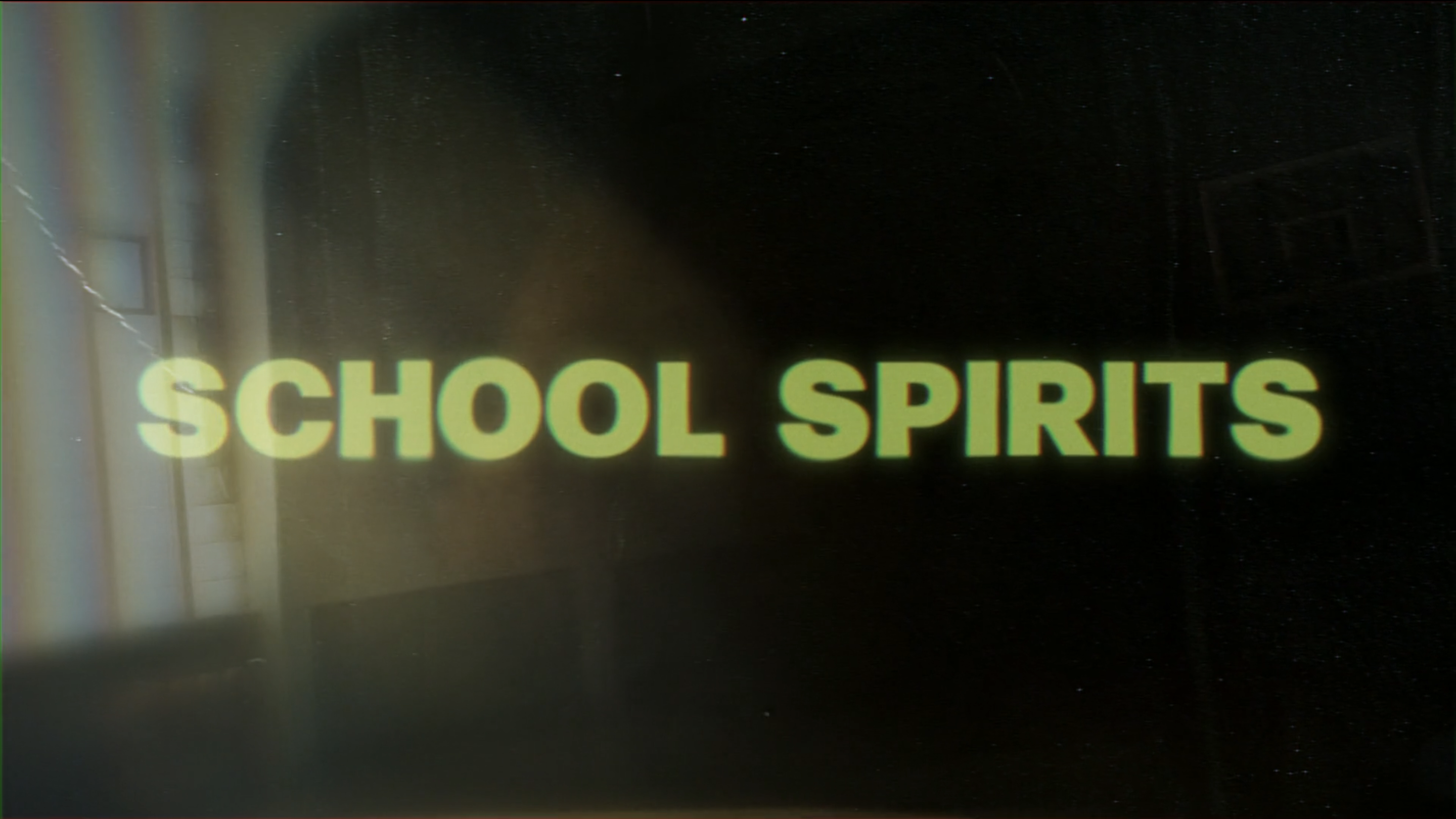
- Genre: Supernatural; Teen drama; Mystery; Horror
- Created by: Megan Trinrud & Nate Trinrud
- Based on: School Spirits by: Megan Trinrud; Nate Trinrud; Maria Nguyen
- Starring: Peyton List; Kristian Ventura; Milo Manheim; Spencer MacPherson; Kiara Pichardo; Sarah Yarkin; Nick Pugliese; Rainbow Wedell; Josh Zuckerman
- Country of origin: United States
- Original language: English
- No. of seasons: 3
- No. of episodes: 24

Production
- Executive producers: Oliver Goldstick; Megan Trinrud; Nate Trinrud; Max Winkler; Peyton List
- Producers: Vicki Sotheran; Don Dunn; Natalia Castells-Esquivel; Peyton List
- Production locations: Vancouver, British Columbia
- Cinematography: Craig Dean Devine
- Editor: Robert Lattanzio
- Running time: 44–56 minutes
- Production company: Paramount Television Studios (Note: Known as Awesomeness for seasons 1–2)

Original release
- Network: Paramount+
- Release: March 9, 2023 – present

School Spirits is an American supernatural teen drama television series created by Megan Trinrud and Nate Trinrud, adapted from their own graphic novel with Maria Nguyen, that premiered on Paramount+ on March 9, 2023. Featuring an ensemble cast led by Peyton List, Kristian Ventura, and Milo Manheim, the series follows a teenaged girl (List) who becomes stuck in the afterlife and must investigate her own mysterious disappearance, leading to a discovery of many dark secrets. The series's third season premiered in January 2026. In March 2026, after the third-season finale, the series was renewed for a fourth season.

== Plot ==
Set in the fictional town of Split River, Wisconsin, the show follows Maddie, a teen girl stuck in the afterlife investigating her own mysterious disappearance; she goes on a crime-solving journey as she adjusts to high school in the afterlife, but the closer she gets to the truth, the more secrets and lies she discovers.

== Cast and characters ==
=== Main ===
- Peyton List as Maddie Nears, a teenager who suddenly finds herself among the spirits that inhabit Split River High School. Maddie cannot remember what happened to her and spends the first season investigating her possible murder. Like all the spirits at the high school, she cannot leave the school grounds. List also portrays Janet Hamilton when Janet is inhabiting Maddie's body.
- Kristian Ventura as Simon Elroy, Maddie's best friend in high school and the only living person who can now see and talk with her
- Milo Manheim as Wally Clark, a teenage spirit who died during a high school football game in 1983. He becomes romantically interested in Maddie.
- Spencer MacPherson as Xavier Baxter, Maddie's boyfriend in the living world. Maddie learns that he was cheating on her with cheerleader Claire Zomer.
- Kiara Pichardo as Nicole Herrera, a close friend of Maddie and Simon
- Sarah Yarkin as Rhonda Rosen, a cynical teenage spirit who was murdered by her guidance counselor in 1963
- Nick Pugliese as Charley Kitani, a teenage spirit who becomes Maddie's first friend in the afterlife. Charley, who was allergic to nuts, died when he left his EpiPen at home and ate fries cooked in peanut oil at school in 1994. Before his death, Charley was in a relationship with Emilio Figueroa, who is now a teacher at the school.
- Rainbow Wedell as Claire Zomer, the school's head cheerleader, Xavier's secret girlfriend, and Maddie's former childhood friend
- Josh Zuckerman as Everett Martin (seasons 2–present, recurring season 1), a spirit at Split River High School who leads an "afterlife support group". He was a science teacher before dying in a fire in his classroom lab in the 1950s. He appears to be interested to helping the teenage spirits "cross over".
- Jess Gabor as Janet Hamilton (Note: In season one, Janet is portrayed by an unknown stand-in and Peyton List.) (season 2; guest season 3), a teenage spirit who was an aspiring scientist and who was raised in a Christian household. She is mentioned throughout the first season, as the spirits had assumed she had crossed over, but after investigation it is revealed she did not and was locked in the fallout shelter in the basement. After Maddie remembers how she died, it is revealed Janet had possessed Maddie's body in an attempt to escape the shelter by pushing Maddie's spirit into the afterlife.
- Miles Elliot as Yuri (season 3, recurring season 2), a teenage spirit who has spent his afterlife at the pottery wheel, ignoring most of the other ghosts. Yuri died in the school's greenhouse in 1977.
- Ci Hang Ma as Quinn (season 3, recurring season 2), a teenage spirit who died in a bus accident on the return from a competition with the high school's marching band in 2004.

=== Recurring ===
- Maria Dizzia as Sandra Nears, Maddie's alcoholic mother
- RaeAnne Boon as Dawn (season 1, guest seasons 2–3), a carefree teenage spirit who died by accidental electrocution in 1972
- Patrick Gilmore as Mr. Anderson, the high school's literature teacher who harbors a secret
- Ian Tracey as Baxter, Xavier's father and the town's sheriff, who is investigating Maddie's disappearance while running for re-election
- Jennifer Tilly as Deborah Hunter-Price (season 3), the new superintendent of Split River High

=== Guest ===
- Lizzy McAlpine as Joyce Ball, a beatnik student in a flashback in Season 3

== Episodes ==
Season	Episodes	Originally released	
Season	Episodes	First released	Last released
1	8	March 9, 2023	April 12, 2023
2	8	January 30, 2025	March 6, 2025
3	8	January 28, 2026	March 4, 2026

=== Season 1 (2023) ===
No. overall	No. in season	Title	Directed by	Teleplay by	Original release date
1	1	"My So-Called Death"	Max Winkler	Megan Trinrud & Nate Trinrud	March 9, 2023
Maddie is the latest of deaths at her high school, the only difference being she does not know how she died. While attempting to uncover what led to her death, she bonds with another ghost Charley. Meanwhile, Maddie's pre-death friends Simon and Nicole attempt to discover what happened to her, and Simon suspects Maddie's boyfriend Xavier. After an altercation between the two, Xavier is caught holding onto Maddie's phone. Later, an assembly is held in memory of Maddie, which Simon does not attend. Staying in his classroom, he and Maddie are both shocked to find he can see her.
2	2	"The Fault of Our Scars"	Max Winkler	Oliver Goldstick	March 9, 2023
Maddie tries to work out why Simon can see and hear her, although Charley advises against telling the other ghosts, worried that they may try to take advantage by asking for favors. Xavier's father, the sheriff, insists that he stay home from school to avoid causing trouble since he is the prime suspect in Maddie's disappearance, and especially as DNA tests prove the blood in the boiler room belongs to Maddie. Mr. Martin tries to help Maddie come to terms with her death and move on by writing her own obituary. Maddie asks Simon to help investigate her death since she cannot leave the school grounds, but this proves difficult, and arouses the suspicion of a teacher, Mr. Anderson.
3	3	"Dead and Confused"	Oran Zegman	Thomas Higgins	March 9, 2023
Maddie and Simon fall out over his investigation of her death when he suspects Mr Anderson of withholding secrets. Flashbacks show he helped Maddie out when she crashed her mother's car, and supported her in dealing with an alcoholic parent. As a result, Maddie asks Simon to stop investigating, but he ignores her and investigates on his own. Xavier follows Nicole to a secret place she and Maddie used to hang out, and tells her about talking to Maddie's mother. Nicole and Xavier decide to search for Maddie together. Meanwhile, Mr Martin takes the ghosts outside to have a field day, which involves them taking all their frustrations out by destroying school property. Maddie asks Rhonda about her story because of the parallels in her friendship with Mr Anderson, but instead learns why she and Simon can communicate.
4	4	"Ghoul Intentions"	Oran Zegman	Lijah Barasz	March 16, 2023
5	5	"The Twilight End Zone"	Brian Dannelly	Bernadette Luckett	March 23, 2023
6	6	"Grave the Last Dance"	Brian Dannelly	Natalia Castells-Esquivel	March 30, 2023
7	7	"Séance Anything"	Hannah Macpherson	Oliver Goldstick	April 6, 2023
8	8	"Madison's Body"	Hannah Macpherson	Megan Trinrud & Nate Trinrud	April 12, 2023
Simon, Xavier, Nicole and Claire look into the house Xavier previously broke into, looking for the hooded person Xavier saw. During their investigation, the hooded person critically injures Xavier before driving off, though Nicole manages to take a picture of their face. Meanwhile, Wally, Charley and Rhonda end up trapped in the boiler room, where they discover that Mr. Martin had been holding onto several of their belongings. Simon returns to the school, and explains to Maddie his belief that he is only imagining her presence at the school, revealing the hooded person to have been Maddie. When Maddie goes to rescue the three ghosts from the boiler room Mr. Martin approaches her, and she finally uncovers what happened to her: Janet, a ghost that the others assumed moved on, had actually stolen her body, and is the person that Simon and the others are chasing after.

=== Season 2 (2025) ===
No. overall	No. in season	Title	Directed by	Teleplay by	Original release date
9	1	"Whatever Happened to Maddie Nears?"	Hannah Macpherson	Megan Trinrud & Nate Trinrud	January 30, 2025
As she realizes Mr. Martin was there when she became a ghost and Janet took over her body, Maddie confronts him, making him run away into hiding. Meanwhile, Janet, inhabiting Maddie's body, takes a journey to her family's now-crumbling farmhouse, starting a trip down memory lane. Simon wrestles with his desire to help Maddie and the possibility he had been hallucinating. The ghostly gang finds traces of Janet's captivity in the school's basement. Xavier wakes up, but not in the land of the living.
10	2	"Field of Screams"	Hannah Macpherson	Oliver Goldstick	January 30, 2025
On the run, Janet is haunted by her past life, while the ghostly group continues their search for Mr. Martin within the high school grounds. Xavier wakes up for good, changed by his encounter with the hospital's afterlife lounge. Simon reveals Janet's body-snatching secret to the living students. Quinn, a member of the ghost marching band, snaps out of her trance thanks to Rhonda and joins the gang in trying to figure what their basement discoveries mean. The school ghosts meet Yuri, a supposedly only-Russian-speaking exchange student that died in the '70s, to no avail, until Charley is left alone with him. They bond over wabi-sabi. Xavier and Nicole unknowingly start speaking to each other on an online ghost message board. The future of Maddie's body is uncertain as a fire starts at Janet's abandoned farmhouse, with Maddie/Janet in its center.
11	3	"Can't Hauntly Wait"	Brian Dannelly	Thomas Higgins	January 30, 2025
Determined to uncover the truth about her daughter, Sandra refuses to back down, while Janet—still in Maddie's body—causes chaos in the living world, exploring a place she longed to go to as a living: University. Claire meets Nicole's brother Diego in an unexpected way. Simon and his friends search for Janet/Maddie in an unexpected location, as the ghosts piece together clues from Janet's past. Rhonda discovers her version of Hell with the help of the paper Janet stole from her.
12	4	"A Walk-In to Remember"	Brian Dannelly	Lijah Barasz	February 6, 2025
Janet/Maddie, stunning Sandra as she goes back home, acts secretive. Meanwhile, the ghost gang come up to the conclusion that objects connected to their deaths unlock scars, their own personal Hells. Wally and Charley explore theirs. At a mandatory school event, tensions rise among the living students, who are more focused on Janet's return than anything else. A new spirit enters the high school afterlife as Mr. Martin enters their body.
13	5	"Ghost Who's Coming to Dinner"	Craig Johnson	Bernadette Luckett	February 13, 2025
Sandra invites Maddie's friends over for dinner, Simon and Maddie organizes a meeting between the ghost gang and living crew, thanks to a creative set-up. Claire shares an idea to lure Janet back to the high school. Maddie explores the school's "scars" and uncovers startling information about Janet that shakes her resolve. Charley debates letting Yuri get closer to him. Rhonda blows up at Quinn upon seeing the object of a bad memory. The tense gathering ends with Maddie realizing that her cover has been blown. At the same time, Maddie and Wally share a moment, Charley asks Yuri on a date, and Rhonda discovers her former best friend is not the monster she thought she was. While the ghost gang discovers Mr. Anderson, one of Maddie's teachers, is now a ghost, Mr. Martin in Mr. Anderson's body, rings Sandra's door. Maddie gets taken.
14	6	"Ghost Pointe Blank"	Craig Johnson	Nandita Seshadri & Matthew Hayes	February 20, 2025
Simon and his friends having taken Maddie/Janet to a remote cabin allows them to dig into her story. Nicole tells Xavier she knows he's the one she's been messaging online, to his surprise. On the day of Wally's graduation class' 40 years reunion, Maddie and the ghosts uncover a connection between their scars, Yuri and Charley kiss, while Janet agrees to go back to the high school and give Maddie her body back, after one last occasion to feel the fresh air. Mr. Martin corners her on the nearby lake's pontoon.
15	7	"Anatomy of a Fallout Shelter"	Hannah MacPherson	Natalia Castells-Esquivel	February 27, 2025
Janet agrees to go back to Split River High and reunite Maddie with her body. She explains that her loyalty to Mr. Martin began when he lied and told the first ghost they met, Rhonda, that the two of them actually died on separate instances, thus allowing her to pretend the fire that killed them was not her fault. We then follow the story of how they each stole other ghosts' keys before they could realize they exist. Eventually, they realized that the veil between the worlds thins whenever a ghost enters their scar, and that this may be the key to crossing over. Mr. Martin did not lock Janet into the fallout shelter against her will but she was actually a willing participant until he refused to let her go. Her repeated trips into her scar combined with being in the same emotional state as Maddie is what allowed Janet to possess her. Simon gets angry at Maddie for sitting around chatting instead of just getting her body back. Meanwhile, Mr. Martin, having recovered from being knocked into the lake in the previous episode, finds Nicole, Claire, Xavier, and newly arrived Diego and threatens Diego to steal his car. When we return to Janet, we learn that her key is not watch that she shares with Mr. Martin but Mr. Martin himself. Thus, he needs to be there in order for her to use it. Simon calls the rest of the group to tell them to find that Mr. Martin is already in the wind.
16	8	"Fire, Talk to Me"	Hannah MacPherson	Megan Trinrud & Nate Trinrud	March 6, 2025
Mr. Martin arrives at the school and seemingly speaks with Janet, but it's actually Maddie. He gets into a small fight with Simon, allowing Janet to tase him. Nicole remembers that Eugene has evidence in a storage unit behind the nursing home, and she and Claire head there as Xavier is picked up by his father. Xavier tries to explain everything to his dad, but, of course, the latter doesn't believe him. Mr. Anderson scolds Mr. Martin for punching Simon, and as Mr. Martin gets angrier, Simon kicks the chair he's tied to, causing him to collide into Mr. Anderson and giving the latter his body back. Nicole and Claire get into the unit, and Nicole tells Claire about Xavier being "Shreadhead99". Xavier arrives at the storage unit. Simon explains everything to Mr. Anderson, then tells him about Diego's stolen car. At the police station, Baxter speaks with Sandra, who explains that Maddie doesn't even seem like Maddie, causing him to get skeptical. Mr. Anderson arrives and announces that he has an update on Maddie. Simon, Nicole, and Claire find a tape that explains that Mr. Martin killed Janet as revenge from Janet's dad getting him fired. Maddie begins bidding farewell to everyone, before Xavier, Nicole, and Claire arrive, and Mr. Martin snatches Janet into his scar. The other ghosts except Maddie enter in the scars, rushing to Janet and Mr. Martin. Mr. Martin tries to explain to Janet, and Maddie finds the key to her scar. The boiler room in her scar is flooded, but she is saved by Wally. They make it to the scar, and Janet's door to cross over opens. Mr. Martin tries to steal it, but Janet knocks him down, explaining she's not ready to move on yet. They trap Mr. Martin in the scar and run to the outside of the school, where Maddie's empty body is being taken into an ambulance. She gives one final goodbye to Wally before running to her body before it's taken from the school. Simon, unknowing to what just transpired, rushes back into the school. Maddie wakes up in the hospital, finding out that Xavier can see her dad. Xavier apologizes to her, and they mend their relationship. She asks about Simon, and Claire and Nicole go to look for them. Wally is on the field with his key when his door to cross over opens, and he seemingly walks through it. Janet enters Mr. Martin's scar, ready to get answers, but is surprised when she sees Simon there, asking for Maddie.

=== Season 3 (2026) ===
No. overall	No. in season	Title	Directed by	Written by	Original release date
17	1	"It's a Wonderful Afterlife"	Hannah Macpherson	Megan Trinrud & Nate Trinrud	January 28, 2026
18	2	"Mean Ghouls"	Hannah Macpherson	Oliver Goldstick	January 28, 2026
19	3	"The Halls Have Eyes"	Brian Dannelly	Lijah Barasz	January 28, 2026
20	4	"The Bereftest Club"	Brian Dannelly	Zach Dodes	February 4, 2026
21	5	"Raiders of the Lost Scar"	Oliver Goldstick	Bernadette Luckett	February 11, 2026
22	6	"Children of the Scorned"	Nate Trinrud	Morgan Gould	February 18, 2026
23	7	"Midsomester"	Hannah Macpherson	Natalia Castells-Esquivel	February 25, 2026
24	8	"Dawn of the Deb"	Hannah Macpherson	Megan Trinrud & Nate Trinrud	March 4, 2026

== Production ==
=== Development ===
In June 2023, the series was renewed for a second season. In March 2025, the series was renewed for a third season. In March 2026, the series was renewed for a fourth season.

=== Casting ===
In July 2025, it was announced that Miles Elliot and Ci Hang Ma, who had both recurred in the second season, had been promoted to the main cast for the third season. Three new recurring third-season roles were also announced: Jennifer Tilly as Dr. Deborah Hunter-Price, Ari Dalbert as Kyle, and Erika Swayze as Livia.

=== Filming ===
Principal photography for the first season began on August 15, 2022, and concluded on November 3, 2022, in Vancouver, British Columbia.

== Release ==
The first season of School Spirits premiered March 9, 2023, on Paramount+. The second season premiered on January 30, 2025. The third season premiered on January 28, 2026.

== Reception ==
The review aggregator website Rotten Tomatoes reported an 83% approval rating with an average rating of 7.3/10, based on 18 critic reviews. The website's critics consensus reads, "School Spirits leaves some of its promising potential untapped, but Peyton List's splendid starring performance makes this paranormal mystery a solid watch for anyone who remembers the phantom pain of growing up."

Daniel D'Addario of Variety wrote, "Without losing sight of the sorrow of Maddie's story, School Spirits manages to be surprisingly sparky and fun—proof positive that there are new stories to tell about the institution no one would ever want to be stuck in for their entire afterlife." Daniel Fienberg of The Hollywood Reporter said, "Sometimes the familiar trappings of the high-school genre can open the door for a show to do wilder and more inventive things than more allegedly mature shows. School Spirits, unfortunately, takes no such liberties."
