= Damien Garvey =

Australian actor

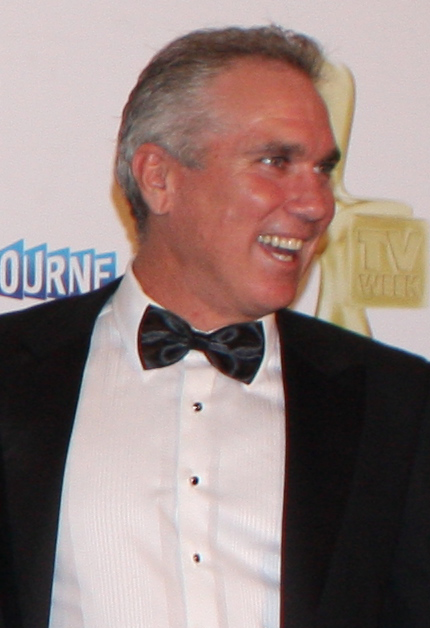
- Garvey at the 2011 Logie Awards
- Born: Australia
- Occupation: Actor
- Years active: 1998–present
- Known for: McLeod's Daughters (2001–2007); Underbelly: The Golden Mile (2010); Terra Nova (2011); Rake (2012–2018); The Leftovers (2017)
- Awards: AFI (2010)

Damien Garvey is an Australian actor and former musician known for his film and television roles.

== Early life and education ==
Damien Garvey graduated from Padua College, a Catholic boys' school in Brisbane, Queensland, in 1982.

== Career ==
Garvey had guest roles in several drama series in the early part of his acting career. Some of his early roles include shows such as Medivac (his first role, in 1998), Water Rats (2000), Young Lions (2002), and the children's drama Cybergirl (2001).

Garvey appeared on McLeod's Daughters, in a recurring role from 2001 until 2007. He then had a role in season one of Sea Patrol (2007).

In 2008 and 2009, he appeared on ABC1's drama East of Everything. In 2010, acting in Channel Nine's Underbelly: The Golden Mile, Garvey won an AACTA Award for Best Guest or Supporting Actor in a Television Drama (2010).

In 2011, he had a role as a bartender and former soldier, Tom Boylan, in the American sci-fi series Terra Nova, filmed entirely on the Gold Coast in Queensland.

In 2012, he returned to Australia to take a recurring role in Rake and the Jack Irish TV films and TV series.

In 2015, Garvey appeared in two episodes of the first season of Ash vs Evil Dead. Since 2018, he has portrayed Detective Senior Sergeant Bryan Nichols in the TV series Harrow (filmed in his childhood city of Brisbane). Garvey played Nichols in all three seasons of the series.

In 2021, Garvey appeared in the TV adaptation of Liane Moriarty’s Nine Perfect Strangers. In 2022, Garvey was announced as part of an extended cast for the AMC series Nautilus.

In 2023, Garvey appeared in the Disney Plus series The Artful Dodger. On 3 February 2025, in a cast announcement for series two, it was announced that Garvey would reprise his role from series one.

=== Film ===
Although appearing mainly on television, Garvey has had several roles in film, including Under the Radar, In Her Skin, Accidents Happen, Daybreakers, Beauty and the Beast, Bait 3D, Drive Hard and Bleeding Steel.

In May 2024, Garvey was named as part of the cast for the Stan Australia feature film Nugget is Dead.

== Music ==
In the late 1980s, Garvey was the lead singer in Brisbane indie rock band Neighbourhood Unit, who released two singles on the Brisbane-based Bent Records label. He then became lead singer in the power-pop band, The Tellers. The Tellers released two albums, Flex and Limited Movement.

In 1999, Garvey appeared in the music video of Powderfinger's "The Day You Come".

== Filmography ==
=== Film ===
Year	Title	Role	Notes
2001	Spudmonkey	Stan	
2002	Blurred	Pigman	
2004	Under the Radar	Gene	
2006	The Marine	River Boat Cop	
2009	In Her Skin	Box Hill Cop	
2009	Accidents Happen	Officer Passman	
2009	Storage	Leonard	
2009	Daybreakers	Senator Westlake	
2010	Beauty and the Beast	Dr. Thorne	
2010	Lou	Colin	
2011	A Heartbeat Away	Hotel Manager	
2012	Mental	First Detective	
2012	Bait 3D	Colins	
2014	Drive Hard	Detective Chief Inspector Smith	
2015	Manny Lewis	Jimmy	
2015	The Fear of Darkness	Senior Detective Von Holzen	
2017	Bleeding Steel	Rick Rogers	
2019	Dora and the Lost City of Gold	Security Guard	
2019	Ride Like a Girl	Terry Bailey	
2020	Love and Monsters	Bill	
2024	Nugget is Dead: A Christmas Story	John Stool	

=== Television ===
Year	Title	Role	Notes	Ref
1998	Adrenaline Junkies	Slugger	Episode: "Protection"	
1999–2001	Beastmaster	Niqit / Terron 2 / Terron Guard	3 episodes	
2000	The Lost World	Ugo	Episode: "Camelot"	
2000	Water Rats	Baracas	2 episodes	
2000	Green Sails	Trawler Captain	Television film	
2001	Finding Hope	Vic	Television film	
2001	Cybergirl	Paramedic	Episode #1.12	
2001–2007	McLeod's Daughters	Dr. Jim Cunningham	9 episodes	
2001–2008	All Saints	Various roles	4 episodes	
2002	Seconds to Spare	Roland	Television film	
2002	Young Lions	William Solomons	Episode: "Nursing Home"	
2003	Fat Cow Motel	Wally Richards	Episode #1.11	
2004	The Alice	Joe	Television film	
2004	Big Reef	Daisy	Television film	
2006	Home and Away	Ray Moran	Episode #1.4189	
2006	Answered by Fire	Ron Nestovic	Television film	
2007	Mortified	Black Zac	Episode: "D.J. Taylor"	
2007	The Starter Wife	Clarity Harbor Staffer #1	Episode: "Hour 3"	
2007	Spy Shop	Tom	10 episodes	
2007–2011	Sea Patrol	Carl Davies / Sgt. Wild	5 episodes	
2008–2009	East of Everything	Owen	11 episodes	
2009	Heartbeat	Jack Meredith	2 episodes	
2010	H_{2}O: Just Add Water	Steve	Episode: "Crime and Punishment"	
2010	Underbelly	Graham 'Chook' Fowler	13 episodes	
2011	Terra Nova	Tom Boylan	8 episodes	
2011	Purged	Death	Television film	
2012	Mabo	Conroy	Television film	
2012	Jack Irish: Black Tide	Stan	Television film	
2012	Jack Irish: Bad Debts	Stan	Television film	
2012–2018	Rake	Cal McGregor	32 episodes	
2013	Reef Doctors	Ranger Laurie Saunders	4 episodes	
2013	Miss Fisher's Murder Mysteries	Neville Gibbs	Episode: "Marked for Murder"	
2014	Secrets & Lies	Stuart Haire	3 episodes	
2014	Jack Irish: Dead Point	Stan	Television film	
2014	The Killing Field	Brett Holloway	Television film	
2015	Texas Rising: The Lost Soldier	Bar Man	2 episodes	
2015	Mako: Island of Secrets	Coach Norris	Episode: "Careful What You Wish For"	
2015	Ash vs Evil Dead	Mr. Roper	2 episodes, season 1	
2016	The Kettering Incident	Max Holloway	8 episodes	
2016–2021	Jack Irish	Stan	16 episodes	
2017	Hoges: The Paul Hogan Story	Jack Hogan	Episode #1.1	
2017	The Leftovers	Chief Kevin Yarborough	3 episodes	
2017	True Story with Hamish & Andy	Phil	1 episode	
2018	Safe Harbour	AFP Officer Wade	2 episodes	
2018	Space Chickens in Space	Glargg	Episode: "Bliblisitting"	
2018	Tidelands	Edwin Welch	2 episodes	
2018	Gezus	David	Television film	
2018–2020	Harrow	Bryan Nichols	30 episodes	
2019	Reef Break	Governor Bruce Jackson	4 episodes	
2019	Nevernight	Fat Daniio	Television film	
2020	The End	Gerry the Lawyer	2 episodes	
2021	Nine Perfect Strangers	Sam	Episode: "Random Acts of Mayhem"	
2022	Joe vs. Carole	Doc Antle	Episode: "Pilot"	
2022	Darby and Joan	Tom	TV series: guest (episode 5)	
2023–present	The Artful Dodger	Governor Fox	8 episodes	
2024	Nautilus	Director Crawley	9 episodes	
2025	The Survivors	Brian Elliott	TV series	
2026	Deadloch	Superintendent Col Culkin	TV series	
2026	Monarch: Legacy of Monsters	US Secretary of Defense	TV series: 1 episode (2.8)	
