= Spencer MacPherson =

Canadian actor (born 1997)

- Born: John Spencer MacPherson; June 12, 1997 (age 29); Mississauga, Ontario, Canada
- Occupation: Actor
- Years active: 2014–present
- Spouse: Paige Exell (m. 2024)

Spencer MacPherson (born 12 June 1997) is a Canadian actor.

MacPherson first rose to notability at the age of 17 first appearing as Hunter Hollingsworth in Degrassi: The Next Generation and its spin off Degrassi: Next Class from 2016 to 2017. Degrassi: The Next Generation ran on MTV in Canada and TeenNick in the United States. Following its cancellation in 2015, Netflix picked up Degrassi: Next Class which ran for 4 seasons.

In addition to his role on Degrassi, MacPherson is also known for playing King Charles in the CW show Reign, Scout West on the Canadian drama Northern Rescue, and Sparrow on the Canadian supernatural teen comedy-drama Astrid and Lilly Save the World. In addition to his television roles, MacPherson has appeared in several movies including the 2019 Canadian period drama film Brotherhood.

As of 2023, he was starring as Xavier Baxter in the Paramount+ supernatural teen drama television series School Spirits alongside Peyton List and Milo Manheim.

== Early life ==
John Spencer MacPherson was born on June 12, 1997, and grew up in Mississauga, Ontario, Canada. His father, Bobby MacPherson, is a businessman and his mother, Cheryl MacPherson, is a home-maker. He has two older sisters Meagan and Rebecca.

He graduated from Cawthra Park Secondary School in 2015 and went on to begin a professional acting career.

== Career ==
Beginning in 2013, MacPherson was cast in season 13 of the Canadian teen drama television series Degrassi: The Next Generation as the recurring character of Hunter Hollingsworth. MacPherson was promoted to a series regular for season 14. Following the shows subsequent cancellation and television movie Degrassi: Don't Look Back, Netflix picked up the series as Degrassi: Next Class. MacPherson reprises his role as Hunter Hollingsworth in all four seasons before its cancellation in 2017.

In season 3, MacPherson took over the role of King Charles IX of France from Peter DaCunha on the CW historical romantic television drama Reign. Having been a recurring character in season 3, he was promoted to a main character for season 4.

In 2018 he was cast as Scout West in Northern Rescue alongside Amalia Williamson and Taylor Thorne.

Beginning in 2021, he has been playing Xavier Baxter in School Spirits on Paramount+ of which the first season premiered March 9, 2023 and the second season premiered on January 30, 2025.

In 2024, he played the adult Jacob Landry in the series The Way Home for the Hallmark Channel. To prepare for the role, MacPherson watched the entire first season in an attempt to dive into the 1814 time period.

== Personal life ==
Spencer began acting in musical theatre productions at a young age which led to him pursuing a professional career in television and film. He attended Cawthra Park Secondary School of the Arts for Drama and graduated in 2015.

In July 2023, MacPherson announced on Instagram his engagement to longterm girlfriend Paige Exell, the founder and owner of Patti Jane Swim. They married in October 2024. Former Degrassi castmates Sara Waisglass, André Dae Kim, Ehren Kassam, and Jamie Bloch were in attendance.

== Filmography ==
=== Film ===
Year	Title	Role	Notes
2018	Extracurricular	Ian Gordon	
2018	Honey Bee	Zach	
2019	Brotherhood	Vernon Clark	
2022	Secrets at the Inn	Elijah Miller	

=== Television ===
Year	Title	Role	Notes
2013–2015	Degrassi: The Next Generation	Hunter Hollingsworth	Main role (seasons 13–14)
2014–2017	Doki	Sticks Bamberg (voice)	Guest role; 4 episodes
2015–2017	Reign	Charles Valois	Main role
2015	Degrassi: Don't Look Back	Hunter Hollingsworth	TV film
2015	Defiance	Ranikar	Guest role; 4 episodes
2016	American Gothic	Cam Hawthorne (age 17)	Guest role; 3 episodes
2016–2017	Degrassi: Next Class	Hunter Hollingsworth	Main role
2018	Killer High	Tom	TV film
2019	Northern Rescue	Scout West	Main role
2019	Titans	Ellis	Guest role; 1 episode
2021	American Gods	Derek	Guest role; 5 episodes
2021	Nine Films About Technology	Dan	Guest role; 1 episode
2021	Murdoch Mysteries	Lyle "Junior" Anderson	Guest role; 1 episode
2022	Astrid and Lilly Save the World	Sparrow	Main role
2023–present	School Spirits	Xavier Baxter	Main role
2024–2026	The Way Home	Jacob Landry	Recurring role (seasons 2–4)
