= Rainbow Wedell =

Australian actress (born 2001)

- Born: 10 April 2001 (age 25); Vanuatu (Note: According to some sources like Essence (magazine), she was born in Queensland)
- Occupation: Actress
- Years active: 2011–present
- Known for: The Bureau of Magical Things; School Spirits

Rainbow Wedell (born 10 April 2001) is an Vanuatu born Australian actress. She is best known for her main roles as Ruksy Tevala in the low fantasy series The Bureau of Magical Things (2018–2021) and as Claire Zomer in the Paramount+ supernatural teen drama School Spirits (2023–present).

== Early life ==
Wedell is of ni-Vanuatu and Finnish heritage. She was raised in Queensland, Australia, and has described having a nomadic childhood that involved living in multiple countries. She began modeling at an early age and was discovered for her first acting role at about the age of 10 during a modeling class, Wedell describes this as the first time she realized she wanted to be an actress. She was home schooled and began university studies at 16 years old, pursuing health sciences, biomedicine, for a couple of years without completing a degree.

== Career ==
She made her television debut on the sci-fi series Terra Nova as a background villager, she was about 10 years old.

== Filmography ==
Year	Title	Role	Notes
2011	Terra Nova	Villager	Uncredited; 1 episode
2013	Camp	Featured extra	1 episode
2014	Long Shadows	Dancer	Short film
2016	PUSH	Ronnie	Short film
2016	Lagoon		Short film
2017	Teal Soldiers	Tori	Short film
2017	Plumeria: Way of the Swordsmanship	Ora	Short film
2018–2021	The Bureau of Magical Things	Ruksy Tevala	Main role; 40 episodes
2019	Generation Why?	Carmody	Mini-series; 1 episode
2021	She's Got Balls	Jordan	Television film
2021	Welcome to Wrigleton	Extra	Short film
2021	Sunshine	Waitress	Short film
2022	The Wilds	Lena	1 episode
2023	Hope Is the Thing with Feathers	Maddie	Short film
2023–present	School Spirits	Claire Zomer / Claire Zahler	Main role
