= Terra Nova (TV series) =

2011 American science fiction drama television series

- Genre: Action adventure; Drama; Science fiction; Family saga
- Created by: Kelly Marcel; Craig Silverstein
- Starring: Jason O'Mara; Shelley Conn; Christine Adams; Allison Miller; Landon Liboiron; Naomi Scott; Mido Hamada; Alana Mansour; Stephen Lang; Rod Hallett
- Composer: Brian Tyler
- Country of origin: United States
- Original language: English
- No. of seasons: 1
- No. of episodes: 13

Production
- Executive producers: Steven Spielberg; Peter Chernin; René Echevarria; Brannon Braga; Jon Cassar; Aaron Kaplan; Katherine Pope; Darryl Frank; Justin Falvey; Alex Graves; Craig Silverstein; Kelly Marcel
- Producer: Mark H. Ovitz
- Production locations: Queensland, Australia
- Cinematography: Nelson Cragg
- Editors: Jeff Betancourt; Caroline Ross; Henk Van Eeghen
- Running time: 44 minutes
- Production companies: Amblin Television; Chernin Entertainment; Kapital Entertainment; Siesta Productions; 20th Century Fox Television

Original release
- Network: Fox
- Release: September 26 – December 19, 2011

Terra Nova is an American science fiction drama television series created by Kelly Marcel and Craig Silverstein. It aired on the Fox Network for one season from September 26 to December 19, 2011. The series documents the Shannon family's experiences as they establish themselves as members of a colony, set up 85 million years in the Earth's past, fleeing the dystopian overpopulated and hyper-polluted present of the mid-22nd century. On March 5, 2012, Fox announced that the show had been cancelled.

== Plot ==
The series is initially set in 2149, when overpopulation and declining air quality threaten all life on Earth. When scientists discover a temporal rift permitting (one-way) human transmission, they initiate a series of "pilgrimages" to a parallel "time stream" resembling Earth's Cretaceous Period. The series focuses primarily on police officer James "Jim" Shannon, his wife Elisabeth, and their three children Josh, Maddy, and Zoe, as they join the colony there, named "Terra Nova", Latin for "New Earth", "New World" or "New Land".

Elisabeth Shannon is chosen to join Terra Nova for her medical expertise, and her two older children with her. Her husband, imprisoned for violating population control by harboring a third child and assaulting an official agent to protect his young daughter, stows away to join them and eventually convinces the colony's leader, Commander Nathaniel Taylor, that his own police expertise is of use to the administration.

Opposing the colony (and its leader Taylor) is a group of separatists known as the "Sixers", so-called because they arrived in the "Sixth Pilgrimage", working in concert with corporate industrialists to strip the Cretaceous Earth of its resources and transmit them to 2149, allowing for massive profits at the cost of environmental destruction. It is later revealed that Commander Taylor's estranged grown son, Lucas, is working with the Sixers as well. Toward the end of the series, Lucas perfects travel to and from the future, thus enabling the industrialists, with a private army called "The Phoenix Group", to invade Terra Nova. At the end of the series, Jim Shannon returns to 2149 to destroy the gateway permitting travel to the Cretaceous, whereupon the Phoenix Group retreats to the nearby "Badlands", leaving behind a wooden ship's figurehead apparently located there by another temporal rift.

== Cast ==
=== Main ===
- Jason O'Mara as James "Jim" Shannon, a former Chicago Police narcotics detective. He is married to Elisabeth and is the father of their three children. After a lengthy imprisonment for breaking population-control laws in 2149, he escaped and rejoined his family in the Terra Nova colony, where he worked on the gardening division. After saving Commander Taylor from an assassination attempt, he joined Terra Nova's security forces, eventually becoming third-in-command of the colony.
- Shelley Conn as Dr. Elisabeth Shannon, a trauma surgeon who works at Terra Nova's medical center. She is married to Jim and is the mother of their three children. In the series premiere, she was instrumental in Jim's escape from prison and arrival in Terra Nova.
- Landon Liboiron as Josh Shannon, Jim and Elisabeth's 17-year-old son. Reluctant to leave his girlfriend behind in 2149, he initially resented his father; but in later episodes they repair their relationship.
- Naomi Scott as Maddy Shannon, Jim and Elisabeth's 16-year-old daughter. Intelligent but socially clumsy, and depicted principally either as a student or the love interest of Mark Reynolds, a young soldier.
- Alana Mansour as Zoe Shannon, the five-year-old (later six-year-old) daughter of Jim and Elisabeth Shannon. Early in her life, she was kept hidden by her family, having been a third child in contravention of the population control laws of 2149. When she was discovered, Jim was sent to prison. With the aid of a friend, Zoe was smuggled into Terra Nova and permitted to remain in the colony.
- Christine Adams as Mira, the leader of the "Sixers", a rebel group that arrived with the Sixth Pilgrimage but who soon broke away to oppose Terra Nova and to prepare for the Phoenix Group's invasion. Mira's daughter, Sienna, is still in 2149 and is held by Mira's employers to ensure her cooperation. Mira's ambition is to return to 2149 and have a comfortable and peaceful life with her daughter.
- Allison Miller as Skye Alexandria Tate, a veteran resident of Terra Nova from the Fifth Pilgrimage, and Josh's closest friend. Her parents reportedly died three years before the series begins, and she was subsequently adopted by Commander Taylor. She is later revealed to be a Sixer mole, being blackmailed by the Sixers who held her mother hostage and controlled the medicine which kept her alive.
- Mido Hamada as Guzman, a member of Terra Nova's security forces and father of Tasha, a teenage girl who is one of Skye's closest friends. Guzman was originally meant to have a bigger role and was supposed to be the colony's second-in-command, which is why Hamada was credited as a member of the main cast. However, after the pilot, Guzman was written out of the show, and the second-in-command was said to be Lt. Washington.
- Stephen Lang as Commander Nathaniel Taylor, Terra Nova's head of state. Himself the first colonist, Taylor survived 118 days alone, helped build a community as new settlers arrived, and has been the colony's leader for seven years. When Skye's parents died, he became her legal guardian and father figure. Taylor's relationship with his son, Lucas, has degraded severely since an incident in 2138 in which Taylor was forced to sacrifice his wife to enemy fire. Lucas arrived in Terra Nova on the Second Pilgrimage, but plotted against his father to destroy the colony, and has since re-appeared as antagonist.
- Rod Hallett as Dr. Malcolm Wallace, the chief science officer for the Terra Nova colony. Early in the first season, it is revealed that he recruited Elisabeth for Terra Nova, having earlier had a romantic relationship with her, and he was hopeful that she would leave her husband in prison in 2149.

=== Recurring ===
- Caroline Brazier as Deborah Tate. Under the cover story that she died in a fever epidemic, she was taken to the Sixers by her daughter Skye who made a deal with Mira, the Sixers' leader, for treatment of her mother's illness in return for spying on Taylor and the colonists. Later in the first season, she was rescued by the soldier Curran and returned to the colony.
- Emelia Burns as Corporal Reilly, a member of Terra Nova's security forces and an expert at defusing bombs.
- Damien Garvey as Tom Boylan, a bartender and former soldier who occasionally trades with the Sixers. Often secretive and abrasive, he operates minor crime but proves loyal to Terra Nova when the Phoenix Group invades.
- Dean Geyer as Corporal Mark Reynolds, a soldier under Taylor's command and eventually the suitor of Maddy Shannon. He is a competent soldier and able survivalist, but often uncertain of his own position, and therefore formal, when interacting with Maddy and her father Jim.
- Simone Kessell as Lieutenant Alicia "Wash" Washington, the second-in-command to Nathaniel Taylor. She had served with Taylor for several years prior to her assignment to Terra Nova. In the season finale, she was reduced by the Phoenix Group to menial status and later killed by Lucas Taylor for abetting the Shannon family's escape from the settlement.
- Peter Lamb as Casey Durwin, a tradesman that works in Terra Nova's market and a former member of the U.S. army. He operates a motorized wheelchair, allegedly having lost his legs to a Carnotaurus.
- Sam Parsonson as Hunter Boyce, a teenager that lives in Terra Nova and came on the 5th Pilgrimage. He is one of Skye's closest friends and is also one of her housemates. He was once injured by an Acceraptor (a fictional species of theropod), and once contracted a 30-ft. tapeworm-like parasite of which he was relieved by Elisabeth and Skye.
- Romy Poulier as Kara, Josh's girlfriend from 2149. She was unable to join the Shannons on the Tenth Pilgrimage in the series premiere, whereafter Josh cut a deal with the Sixers to bring her to Terra Nova. She eventually arrived with the Eleventh Pilgrimage, but was killed shortly thereafter by the Phoenix Group, who used a suicide bomber upon arrival.
- Rohan Nichol as Weaver, a senior associate of Lucas and the Phoenix Group. He commanded the mercenary forces that invaded Terra Nova in the season finale. Thereafter he returned to 2149, but was slain by a juvenile Carnotaurus brought to the future by Jim.
- Jay Ryan as Curran, a member of Terra Nova's security team. Banished from the colony for murdering a fellow soldier named Ken Foster, Curran was later encountered by Taylor in the local jungle, who saved Curran from an 'Ancestral Komodo'. Thereafter Taylor employed him to infiltrate the Sixers' camp, whence he rescued Deborah Tate. In recognition of Curran's actions, he was readmitted to Terra Nova.
- Matt Scully as Private Dunham, a member of Terra Nova's security team.
- Damian Walshe-Howling as Carter, a member of the Sixers who was once injured and captured at Terra Nova. After escaping, he made an attempt on Nathaniel Taylor's life and was stopped by Jim Shannon, and released during a trade with the Sixers.
- Ashley Zukerman as Lucas Taylor, the estranged, deceptive and vengeful son of Nathaniel Taylor, and the main antagonist of the series. A brilliant yet unstable physicist employed by the same people who hired the Sixers and the Phoenix Group to assist their invasion of the alternate, past Earth, for which he remained there at some length, periodically revealing the results of his calculations. During the finale, his plans were counteracted by Jim Shannon, and Lucas himself was wounded by Skye and not seen again.

=== Uncredited ===
- Rainbow Wedell as a background character.

== Episodes ==
No.	Title	Directed by	Written by	Original release date	Prod. code	U.S. viewers (millions)
1	"Genesis"	Alex Graves	Story by : Kelly Marcel & Craig Silverstein; Teleplay by : Craig Silverstein & Kelly Marcel and Brannon Braga & David Fury	September 26, 2011	1ASW01	9.22
2	"Genesis"	Alex Graves	Brannon Braga & David Fury	September 26, 2011	1ASW02	9.22
Part 1: In 2149, Earth is dying due to overpopulation and pollution. Policeman Jim Shannon is sentenced to six years in prison for assaulting a Population Control officer after Jim and his wife, Elisabeth, were discovered to have a forbidden third child. Two years later, Elisabeth, a doctor, is recruited to time travel with the Tenth Pilgrimage to Terra Nova, a prehistoric colony that is attempting to reinvent the past for a better future while co-existing with dinosaurs. With only teenagers Josh and Maddy allowed to accompany her, Elisabeth helps Jim escape prison. He and five-year-old Zoe barely succeed in travelling to Terra Nova with the family. Once there, Jim meets colony leader Commander Nathaniel Taylor. Though displeased by Jim's arrival, Taylor assigns him agricultural work. Josh meets some independent-minded teenagers, including Skye. The group take Josh on a secret jungle excursion where they keep an alcohol still. At an off-limit waterfall, Skye shows Josh unusual petroglyphs carved into the rocks. Part 2: An enemy group called the Sixers arrived during the Sixth Pilgrimage but have since formed a rival colony to oppose the Terra Nova settlement. When Carter, a captured Sixer, attempts to assassinate Commander Taylor, Jim subdues him. Taylor recruits Jim to his security team. The Sixers, led by Mira, arrive at Terra Nova to negotiate Carter's release. Meanwhile, Josh, Skye and her friends are stranded after Sixers steal their vehicle's power cells; a pack of slashers (a common name for the fictional Acceraptors) suddenly attack. The Terra Nova rescue team arrives and saves the teens. The carvings at the waterfall are revealed to have been put there by Taylor's son (who disappeared from Terra Nova five years ago) and that he puts them there to show his father he is closer to finishing his work.
3	"Instinct"	Jon Cassar	René Echevarria & Brannon Braga	October 3, 2011	1ASW03	8.73
When a previously unknown species of a migratory pterosaur start appearing en masse, it is discovered that Terra Nova was built on their breeding ground, which they return to every nine years. Elisabeth begins researching for ways to divert them from the colony. Also, Jim discovers that Elisabeth's former college flame, Dr. Malcolm Wallace, now in Terra Nova, is who recruited her; he apparently expected Jim would still be incarcerated back in 2149. Josh spends more time with Skye, but misses his girlfriend, Kara, who was left behind. Maddy asks Jim for fatherly advice about boys after young soldier Mark Reynolds shows an interest in her. Elisabeth and Malcolm devise a method to reroute the pterosaurs to a new permanent breeding ground.
4	"What Remains"	Nelson McCormick	Brynn Malone	October 10, 2011	1ASW05	7.00
While investigating the sudden radio silence at a nearby research outpost, Elisabeth, Jim, Malcolm, and Commander Taylor discover that a mysterious and fatal virus causing severe memory loss and catatonia has infected the staff there. Only Jim remains uninfected, and Elisabeth races to find a cure while she is still cognizant. Meanwhile, despite a mutual attraction, Josh resists Skye's interest in him due to Kara. Skye introduces him to bar owner Tom Boylan, who may be able to help get Kara to Terra Nova on a future pilgrimage. Boylan is later seen trading with the Sixers. Also, Maddy and Reynolds have their first date.
5	"The Runaway"	Jon Cassar	Barbara Marshall	October 17, 2011	1ASW06	8.31
When orphaned Sixer girl Leah Marcos (Morgan Davies) seeks asylum in Terra Nova, Jim and Taylor disagree over whether she can be trusted. Taylor looks for a traitor in his midst. Mira plots to regain a mysterious box from the colony, and later tells Jim that Terra Nova was not really established for humanity to start over. Meanwhile, Maddy begins an apprenticeship with her mother but quickly discovers she is unsuited to working in medicine. Also, Reynolds courts Maddy.
6	"Bylaw"	Nelson McCormick	Paul Grellong	October 31, 2011	1ASW04	6.59
After security operative Ken Foster is killed at a utility outpost by a nykoraptor trapped inside the shed, Jim suspects it was not accidental, and begins investigating the colony's first murder. A suspect named Howard Milner readily confesses, and Taylor banishes him from the colony. Jim comes to doubt Milner's confession, believing he may be protecting his wife, who had an affair with the victim. The true murderer is Curran, a soldier who killed Foster over gambling debts. Milner is allowed back into the colony, and Curran is banished. Meanwhile, Josh is working at Boylan's bar and needs to meet with Mira to discuss bringing Kara to Terra Nova. Also, Elisabeth works to save an unborn Ankylosaurus.
7	"Nightfall"	Jon Cassar	Terry Matalas & Travis Fickett	November 7, 2011	1ASW07	7.75
An exploding meteor generates an electromagnetic pulse that destroys all technology in and around Terra Nova, leaving the colony vulnerable. Jim and Zoe, trapped in an underground "Eye" that acts as a holographic encyclopedia and simulator, search for a way out. On their first date alone, Maddy and Reynolds become stranded outside the fence and must evade predators. In the medical center, Skye assists Elisabeth in treating Hunter, who is infected with a deadly parasite. Taylor forces Boylan to repair the universal chip maker that can restore all technology. Taking advantage of the crisis, Mira and the Sixers attack Terra Nova by herding an Empirosaurus (a fictional spinosaurid) to the colony in a successful bid to retrieve the mysterious box. Later, Mira delivers the box (containing a type of computer) to Lucas Taylor, Commander Taylor's son.
8	"Proof"	Bryan Spicer	David Graziano & Brynn Malone	November 14, 2011	1ASW08	7.01
Maddy suspects that Dr. Ken Horton (Robert Coleby), a renowned scientist who has just returned from a long research mission, may be harboring a dark secret. When she discovers that he murdered the real Horton and assumed his identity, he attempts to kill her with a venomous spider, but Jim finds and saves her. Meanwhile, Josh strikes a deal with the Sixers to bring Kara to Terra Nova on the next pilgrimage, but Mira demands that he first steal medicine from the infirmary. Josh later confesses to his parents and uncovers Boylan's dealings with the Sixers. Also, while in the jungle, Commander Taylor encounters Curran and offers him a deal after saving him from an ancestral Komodo dragon: he can return to the colony if he successfully infiltrates the Sixers' camp and uncovers Mira's spy.
9	"Vs."	Bryan Spicer	Jose Molina	November 21, 2011	1ASW09	6.50
Boylan inadvertently tells Jim about a body buried in the jungle. Jim investigates this as an old murder case that Commander Taylor may have committed. Meanwhile, the colony celebrates the Harvest Festival, in which Zoe stars in a play commemorating Taylor's arrival in Terra Nova. The play reveals an unexpected clue to the murder. Malcolm discovers how the Sixer spy communicates with Mira, but it creates an improbable trail leading to the Shannon house. Taylor stages a false arrest to make Jim drop his investigation. Jim refuses, and Taylor gives in and tells him what happened: Lucas was employed by people who wanted to strip the new world's resources to reap huge profits; he worked on calculations that could make the portal go both ways for them. When Taylor learned the truth, he destroyed Lucas's work. Lucas then summoned General Philbrick, Taylor's superior, to relieve him of command. Taylor refused to step down in order to protect Terra Nova, and he was forced to kill the general in self-defense.
10	"Now You See Me"	Karen Gaviola	Paul Grellong	November 28, 2011	1ASW10	7.19
Mira captures Taylor as he inspects Lucas's most recent rock carvings, but Taylor soon subdues her. Their situation changes rapidly, however, when two slashers stalk them. Taylor and Mira join forces to evade the predators. Meanwhile, Jim and Reynolds nearly capture the Sixers' spy (revealed to be Skye) when they see a telegraph code sent from the colony. Though she evades being found, they narrow the search to 47 suspects. This episode reveals that Skye is giving intelligence to the Sixers because her sick mother (previously believed to have died) is being kept alive by them. Also, the Ankylosaur hatchling, which Zoe has been caring for, is released to the wild.
11	"Within"	Karen Gaviola	Barbara Marshall	December 12, 2011	1ASW11	6.88
Lucas has Skye run his calculations through the Eye so he can solve the equation faster. When she learns that his and the Sixers' employers are going to attack the colony, she decides to quit spying for the Sixers. Meanwhile, Jim and Taylor discover that Skye is the mole. When they confront her, she reveals that Lucas has finished his work. Taylor, expecting a full-on attack with the 11th pilgrimage's arrival, begins planning Terra Nova's defense. Skye is reunited with her mother after Taylor orders Curran to rescue her from the Sixers. Meanwhile, Maddy's plex stops working, and she looks for a way to replace its broken core.
12	"Occupation"	Jon Cassar	Brynn Malone & Barbara Marshall	December 19, 2011	1ASW12	7.24
As the 11th pilgrimage begins arriving, a suicide bomber appears and sets off an explosion, killing Kara and rendering Jim unconscious. Three days later, Jim awakens and learns that mercenaries called the Phoenix Group have captured Terra Nova. Harsh martial law is imposed, while Taylor and his forces remain in the jungle. Mira is sent to the Badlands to retrieve an unknown item. The Phoenix Group intends to strip Terra Nova's resources with the help of powerful pyrosonic bombs, but Taylor's team disarms and steals their test bomb. Jim, Washington, and other colonists coordinate with Taylor in waging guerilla warfare against the Phoenix Group. Josh attacks Lucas when Lucas starts harassing Skye. Josh is restrained and Jim tries to save him, but he fails and they are sent to the brig. Note: This episode was aired immediately before "Resistance" without intervening credits.
13	"Resistance"	Jon Cassar	Terry Matalas & Travis Fickett	December 19, 2011	1ASW13	7.24
Skye persuades Lucas to free Josh, but he tortures Jim for information. Elisabeth tricks Weaver into releasing Jim. The Shannons escape Terra Nova with the help of Washington, who is captured and killed. Taylor realizes they must cut themselves off from 2149 to halt further enemy invasion. Skye lures Lucas into an ambush so that Jim, the pyrosonic bomb and a carnotaurus can be sent to Hope Plaza in a swapped shipping container. Once there, Jim sets the carnotaurus loose and detonates the bomb. He escapes back to Terra Nova with the carnotaurus as Hope Plaza is destroyed. Meanwhile, Lucas escapes from Skye but is found by his father. Taylor and Lucas fight. Skye arrives and shoots Lucas, but he survives and escapes again. Later, the Phoenix Group and the Sixers evacuate the colony and head for the Badlands. The Shannons, Taylor and his people return to the colony. The item Mira retrieved is revealed to be an 18th-century ship's prow, with no clues as to how it arrived in Terra Nova or what else is in the Badlands. Note: This episode was aired immediately after "Occupation" without intervening credits.

== Production ==
"Purely as an exercise in 'Can I write something my dad would like?'", Kelly Marcel produced a treatment for Terra Nova while working in Prime Time Video, a video rental shop in Battersea. After her agent booked her a fortnight in Los Angeles pitching to American networks from a fleabag hotel, she received an offer to write a 13-episode season at $300,000 a show, which Marcel refused. She was just unsure it was what she wanted to write, a fear more certain after producer Steven Spielberg proposed that the series should involve dinosaurs. Instead, she simply sold the idea and returned to London.

Alex Graves signed on to direct the pilot. Brannon Braga and René Echevarria served as showrunners. Australia was chosen after Spielberg vetoed Hawaii because he wanted a different filming location from his 1993 film Jurassic Park. The two-hour pilot was filmed over 26 days in late November to December 2010. It was shot in south-east Queensland, Australia, with locations in Brisbane, the Gold Coast, and the Gold Coast Hinterland, namely Bonogin. The shoot was plagued by torrential rain and additional material had to be shot in 2011, with a total estimated cost of US$14 million to be amortized over the season. More than 250 sets were constructed. An episode took from eight to nine days to shoot, like most television dramas, but six weeks in post-production, twice the television average at the time. The average episode budget was about $4M, not including Australian tax breaks, compared to an average of $3M for broadcast network dramas. Fox Entertainment president Kevin Reilly stated: "This thing is going to be huge. It's going to take an enormous production commitment."

In an unusual decision, Fox skipped ordering just a pilot, and instead immediately ordered thirteen episodes. This was partly due to financial reasons, as the large Australian sets were expensive to dismantle and rebuild. Despite this decision, the producers denied the production was over-budget, with Peter Rice explaining instead the show is "a very expensive ... very ambitious television show." Kevin Reilly continued: "We're not in completely uncharted territory here. The start-up cost for the series is definitely on the high end. But it's not some bank-breaking series." With only 10% of Cretaceous-era dinosaurs recorded in the fossil record, the producers decided to supplement the series with plausible fictional species; palaeontologist Jack Horner was invited to create realistic creatures for the period and different from those of the Jurassic Park film franchise.

In June 2010, the first cast member was announced – Jason O'Mara as Jim Shannon. In late August, Allison Miller joined the cast; playing the role of Skye Tate. In September 2010, Deadline Hollywood reported that Stephen Lang, who played a similar character in the 2009 film Avatar, signed-on to play a leading role of Commander Taylor.

An executive producer, David Fury, left the series as a result of creative differences. In September, Shelley Conn landed the female lead role. In October, Brian Tyler was chosen as the composer, Mido Hamada was cast as a security head, while Landon Liboiron, Naomi Scott, and Alana Mansour were cast as the three children. In November, Christine Adams was cast as Mira. In May 2011, Rod Hallett joined the cast.

The cast and crew returned to Queensland, Australia on May 20, 2011 to continue production on the first season. Filming commenced on May 25, 2011. With a long production process on the series, it was announced in July 2011 that the first season would consist of thirteen episodes to finish airing in December 2011.

Many of the weapons used in the show were reworked and repainted Nerf blasters.

=== Cancellation and motion comic ===
Shortly after the airing of the season one finale in December 2011, Fox Broadcasting stated that no decision would be made until 2012 regarding the continuation of the series. Fox announced the cancellation of Terra Nova on March 6, 2012. 20th Century Fox Television stated that it would try to sell the show to other networks. Following the decision 20th Century Fox entered negotiations with Netflix to possibly create a second season. However nothing ultimately came of this.

Twentieth Century Fox Home Entertainment set up a "video mashup" website where purchasers of the DVD can create a motion comic continuing the series. As of December 2013, the site was no longer active and redirects to Fox Movies.

== Broadcast ==
Terra Nova was expected to premiere in the U.S. in May 2011 with a two-hour preview, but due to the time involved for visual effects, its pilot was moved to autumn (late September) 2011 to air with the rest of season one. In May 2011, Fox announced the series would air on Monday nights, and released a full trailer. Terra Nova premiered at the 2011 San Diego Comic-Con on July 23, 2011. The Fox premiere drew 9.22 million viewers and 3.1 in the 18–49 demo in live plus same day results, rising to 4.1 in Live+3, the best result by a new drama. Terra Nova's high DVR gains were attributed to competition from Monday Night Football which, being a sports event, is less conducive to delayed viewing. In its second week on Fox, the show retained 100% of its demo rating (3.1), the best retention by a new series. Fox aired the entire first season consecutively on Monday nights, until its two-hour finale on December 19, 2011.

In Canada, Citytv simulcast every first-season episode; the Canadian premiere drew 1.4 million viewers, the largest audience for a drama in Citytv's history. In 2015, reruns began airing on Telelatino.

In Australia, where the series was filmed, Network Ten began airing the series within days of its U.S. release. In the UK and Ireland, digital channel Sky 1 broadcast the show from October 3, 2011.

== Reception ==
=== Critical reception ===
Early reviews indicated much promise in the series. In June 2011, Terra Nova was one of eight honorees in the Most Exciting New Series category at the Critics' Choice Television Awards, voted by journalists who had seen the pilots. The Pittsburgh Post-Gazette compared it to Outcasts. The Los Angeles Times wrote: "Easily the most exciting show of the fall season, Fox's Terra Nova has such obvious, instant and demographically diverse appeal." USA Today wrote, "What matters are the dinosaurs, who – particularly in the first hour – are as convincing and startling as TV has ever offered, roaming a gorgeous, CGI-enhanced terrain." The Wall Street Journal wrote: "Terra Nova leaves ye olde cheap-set series in the dust with production values that make each episode look cinematic." The Washington Post wrote, "Literally the biggest thing on TV this fall, Terra Nova has it all: time travel, misguided utopianism, 'Swiss Family Robinson'–style cohesion and lots of hungry dinosaurs. It's all pretty dazzling."

Mid-season reviews were highly critical. Mark A. Perigard of the Boston Herald said that the series was Stargate Universe by Dr. Seuss. Sam Wollaston of The Guardian stated that there was only one interesting character and that "A lot of the fault lies with what they have to say to each other. The script is as corny and cheesy as a family-sized portion of cheesy corn nachos." New York magazine reviewer Chadwick Matlin vowed never to watch the show again, saying "Sure, the premise had promise, but even masochists like us can only take so much." But by the finale in December things had turned around again where critics were mostly pleased and enthusiastic. Entertainment Weekly called the season finale "exciting".

On Metacritic the series has a weighted average score of 64% based on reviews from 28 critics, indicating "generally favorable reviews". On Rotten Tomatoes the series has an approval rating of 62% based on reviews from 55 critics. The site's consensus is: "The excessive exposition can be a lot to keep up with, but Terra Nova boasts appealing visuals and the potential to be a truly compelling series."

=== U.S. ratings ===
The first season averaged 7.52 million American viewers and a 2.5 rating in the 18–49 demographic. The show was ranked the #2 new drama among adults 18–49, the #1 new show among men 18–49, 18–34, and 25–54 and was one of the top 20 regular programs among teens, as of January 1, 2012.

Season	Episodes	Timeslot (ET/PT)	Premiered		Ended		TV season	Rank	Viewers (in millions)
Season	Episodes	Timeslot (ET/PT)	Date	Premiere viewers (in millions)	Date	Finale viewers (in millions)	TV season	Rank	Viewers (in millions)
1	13	Monday 8:00 PM	September 26, 2011	9.22	December 19, 2011	7.24	2011–12	43	10.08

== Awards and nominations ==
In 2011, the series was honored, along with seven others, with the Critics' Choice Television Award for Most Exciting New Series. Also, it won "Best Visual Effects in a Television Series" by the Visual Effects Society in 2011 and was also nominated for "Outstanding Created Environment in a Broadcast Program or Commercial."

== Series DVD release ==
The series was released on a 4-disc DVD set on September 11, 2012. The set contains deleted scenes; bloopers; the Making of the Pilot, an extended episode with commentary, and "Cretaceous Life: The Dinosaurs of Terra Nova".

== Soundtrack ==
The series's original music was composed by Brian Tyler. La-La Land Records released a soundtrack album on October 9, 2012.

Disc 1
No.	Title	Length
1.	"Terra Nova"	2:55
2.	"Cycles of Time"	4:38
3.	"One Last Hope for Humanity"	3:20
4.	"Banishment"	2:19
5.	"This Valley"	2:38
6.	"The Moon"	1:28
7.	"You Let Her Leave With Him"	2:37
8.	"Sky's Mother"	1:28
9.	"The Portal"	3:43
10.	"Someone Wants to Talk With You"	2:31
11.	"More Than a Memory"	4:53
12.	"Patrols"	1:57
13.	"The Plan"	5:19
14.	"Flying Over Terra Nova"	2:02
15.	"I'm Heading Outside the Gates"	4:02
16.	"What Were You Really Doing?"	5:33
17.	"All I Needed to Know"	6:25
18.	"The Investigation of Outpost 9"	5:04
19.	"There Are Millions of Them"	3:23
20.	"Last Known Location"	3:54
21.	"You're My Son"	1:37
22.	"We Brought Back Two"	1:55
23.	"Promises"	2:24

Disc 2
No.	Title	Length
1.	"Magical Journey"	3:02
2.	"Entering the Vortex"	2:50
3.	"Memorial Field"	2:02
4.	"Base Camp"	2:58
5.	"Rebirth"	3:05
6.	"Remember That Handle"	6:09
7.	"New Earth"	1:11
8.	"Sixers Intel"	2:39
9.	"Take the Shot"	2:00
10.	"Memory's Echo"	2:48
11.	"Into the Beyond"	2:13
12.	"Save Your Spot"	3:10
13.	"Figuring Out What Happened"	1:12
14.	"Take a Look Around"	2:11
15.	"I Want to Declare My Intentions"	3:44
16.	"There She Goes"	1:36
17.	"I Sure Hope You Are Right"	2:29
18.	"Preparing for Battle"	2:59
19.	"This Is Lea Marcos"	1:46
20.	"They're In Charge"	1:23
21.	"Opportunity"	1:34
22.	"Prehistory"	3:39
23.	"Shooting Stars"	0:49

== See also ==
- List of films featuring dinosaurs
- Avatar: A film from two years earlier with a similar premise also co-starring Stephen Lang.
