= Drive Hard =

- Theatrical release poster
- Directed by: Brian Trenchard-Smith
- Screenplay by: Brigitte Jean Allen; Brian Trenchard-Smith
- Based on: a screenplay by Chad Law; Evan Law
- Produced by: Pam Collis; Paul O'Kane
- Starring: John Cusack; Thomas Jane; Zoe Ventoura; Christopher Morris; Yesse Spence; Damien Garvey
- Cinematography: Tony O'Louglan
- Edited by: Peter Carrodus
- Music by: Bryce Jacobs
- Production companies: RLJ Entertainment; Voltage Pictures; Odyssey Film Studios Australia
- Distributed by: Transmission Films (Australia); Image Entertainment (US)
- Release dates: 26 May 2014 (United Kingdom); 3 October 2014 (United States)
- Running time: 96 minutes
- Country: Australia
- Language: English
- Budget: $12 million

Drive Hard (originally titled Hard Drive) is a 2014 Australian buddy action film directed by Brian Trenchard-Smith and written by Chad Law, Evan Law, and Trenchard-Smith. A professional thief (John Cusack) takes a former race car driver (Thomas Jane) hostage and forces him to drive his getaway car.

== Plot ==
Former race car driver and American expatriate Peter Roberts has retired at the urging of his lawyer wife, though he resists getting an office job. Instead, he becomes an instructor at a driving school, while waiting for an investment opportunity to open a racing school. After he drops his daughter off to school and learns that he can no longer afford her private school tuition, he takes a fellow American as his first client. The man, Simon Keller, reveals that he has investigated Roberts' finances and personal life. Disturbed, Roberts insists on ending the lesson and returning to the school. Keller agrees but requests that they stop at a bank first, so that he can pay Roberts.

As Keller exits the bank, he opens fire on the guards, drops a bag into the car, and demands that Roberts serve as his getaway driver. Roberts protests in disbelief and attempts to surrender to the police, who open fire on him, too. Roberts reluctantly drives off and evades the police. Keller offers to share a percentage of his loot, but the panicked Roberts insists that he is now going to end up in jail. Keller assures him that the police will not pursue them, as the bank is owned and managed by a criminal syndicate with connections to the local police. Rossi, Keller's former associate, had previously betrayed him in the United States and then joined the Australian syndicate.

Rossi calls off the police and hires mercenaries to kill them. However, Agent Walker of the Australian Federal Police takes charge of the investigation over the objections of the corrupt Detective Chief Inspector Smith. Walker immediately threatens Rossi and Smith, both of whom she suspects to be part of the syndicate. Meanwhile, Keller and Roberts argue over Roberts' disappointment in his life, which Keller states is the result of giving up on his dreams. Upset, Roberts refuses to drive any further, and Keller shoots him with a rubber bullet. The two change cars, and Roberts once again becomes the reluctant driver.

After they evade Rossi's assassins, the car fails, and they pull into a reception hall. The owners recognize them, and an elderly woman viciously attacks Roberts after accidentally shooting her husband. Roberts and Keller escape in the husband's sports car and stop for gas. There, they are again recognized and attacked, though the cashier accidentally kills himself with his own shotgun. At Keller's urging, Roberts phones the police and his wife, telling both that he has been taken hostage, though neither believe him at first. In order to heighten Roberts' fear and make him more believable, Keller puts a gun to Roberts' head and threatens to kill him. In response, Roberts briefly holds Keller at gunpoint with the elderly woman's pistol, but he surrenders it when he realizes that it is empty.

Resigned to his fate as the getaway driver, Roberts offers to drive Keller to his final destination, a marina. On the way, the two reconcile their differences when both admit that the other has made good points about their respective lifestyles. When Roberts antagonizes a motorcycle gang, they become hostile and threaten to kill him. Keller saves his life, and, during the confrontation, the gang reveal themselves to be mercenaries in Rossi's pay. Roberts and Keller fight them off, only to be beset by Rossi himself and more mercenaries at the marina. Meanwhile, DCI Smith confronts Agent Walker, and Walker kills Smith in self-defense.

At the marina, Roberts and Keller defeat the mercenaries, and Roberts declines a share in Keller's stolen loot. Shot and left chained by Keller, Rossi is arrested. Keller handcuffs Roberts to the car and the two argue over whether Keller should punch him to make the situation look more believable; Roberts eventually agrees. Finding him ragged, wounded, and beaten, the police finally believe Roberts' story, and he returns to his family, who now respect him. Though she disapproves, Roberts' wife acquiesces to his return to professional racing.

== Cast ==
- John Cusack as Simon Keller
- Thomas Jane as Peter Roberts
- Zoe Ventoura as Agent Walker
- Christopher Morris as Rossi
- Yesse Spence as Tessa Roberts
- Damien Garvey as Detective Chief Inspector Smith
- Jerome Ehlers as Bank Chairman

== Production ==
Brian Trenchard-Smith described the film as:

An offbeat action comedy tailored to John Cusack and Thomas Jane’s screen personas. I put them together and had some fun with the material. If audiences like Cusack and Jane they’ll enjoy seeing them spark off each other. It’s a nod towards Midnight Run (1988) and other buddy comedies with regular injections of action. It has the stunt of the near miss as opposed to the Fast of the Furious destruction.

The film was originally set in the United States and written as a vehicle for Jean-Claude Van Damme, who dropped out. Trenchard Smith says he subsequently rewrote the script:

There was a window of availability for John Cusack, so if were able to quickly retool it for him and for Australia we could have him, so that’s what I did. We changed the tone and went through the script to make considerable changes to the characters that would work much better, things the Van Damme version didn’t have at all... When you’ve got two great actors who have improvisational ability you might as well plug into it.

The film began shooting on the Gold Coast of Queensland, Australia on 6 June 2013. The shoot took only 18 days.

== Reception ==
Rotten Tomatoes, a review aggregator, reports that 8% of 24 surveyed critics gave the film a positive review; the average rating was 3.5/10. Metacritic rated it 29/100 based on eleven reviews. Dennis Harvey of Variety called it a "by-the-numbers low budget film that is as forgettable as its title." Frank Scheck of The Hollywood Reporter called it "a mild, boring movie with next to no action sequences and a lot of inane chitchat inside cars that are merely doing the speed limit, unlike the dialogue which never gets out of neutral".
