= Frankie Lymon =

American singer (1942–1968)

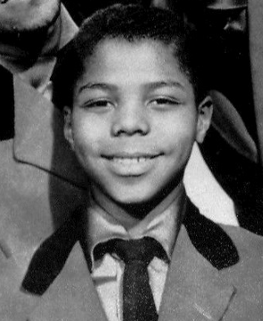
- Lymon in 1956

Background information
- Born: Franklin Joseph Lymon; September 30, 1942; New York City, U.S.
- Died: February 27, 1968 (aged 25) New York City, U.S.
- Genres: R&B; doo-wop; rock and roll; pop
- Occupations: Singer; songwriter; dancer; composer
- Instrument: Vocals
- Years active: 1954–1968
- Labels: Gee; Big Apple; Roulette
- Formerly of: The Teenagers

Franklin Joseph Lymon (September 30, 1942 – February 27, 1968) was an American singer, songwriter, dancer, and composer best known as the boy soprano lead singer of the New York City-based early rock and roll doo-wop group the Teenagers. The group was composed of five boys, all in their early to mid-teens. The original lineup of the Teenagers, an integrated group, included three African-American members, Lymon, Jimmy Merchant, and Sherman Garnes; and two Puerto Rican members, Joe Negroni and Herman Santiago. The Teenagers' first single, 1956's "Why Do Fools Fall in Love", was also their biggest hit. After Lymon went solo in mid-1957, both his career and that of the Teenagers fell into decline. In 1968, Lymon was found dead at age 25 from a heroin overdose. He was posthumously inducted into the Rock and Roll Hall of Fame in 1993 as a member of the Teenagers. Lymon's life was dramatized in the 1998 film Why Do Fools Fall in Love.

== Early life ==
Franklin Joseph Lymon was born in Washington Heights, New York City, on September 30, 1942, to Jeanette and Howard Lymon. Howard was a truck driver and Jeanette was a maid. Both also sang in the gospel group the Harlemaires; Frankie and his brothers, Lewis and Howie, sang with the Harlemaire Juniors (a fourth brother, Timmy, was also a singer, though not with the Harlemaire Juniors). The Lymons struggled to make ends meet, so at age 10, Lymon began working as a grocery boy.

== Career ==
=== Early career and joining the Teenagers ===
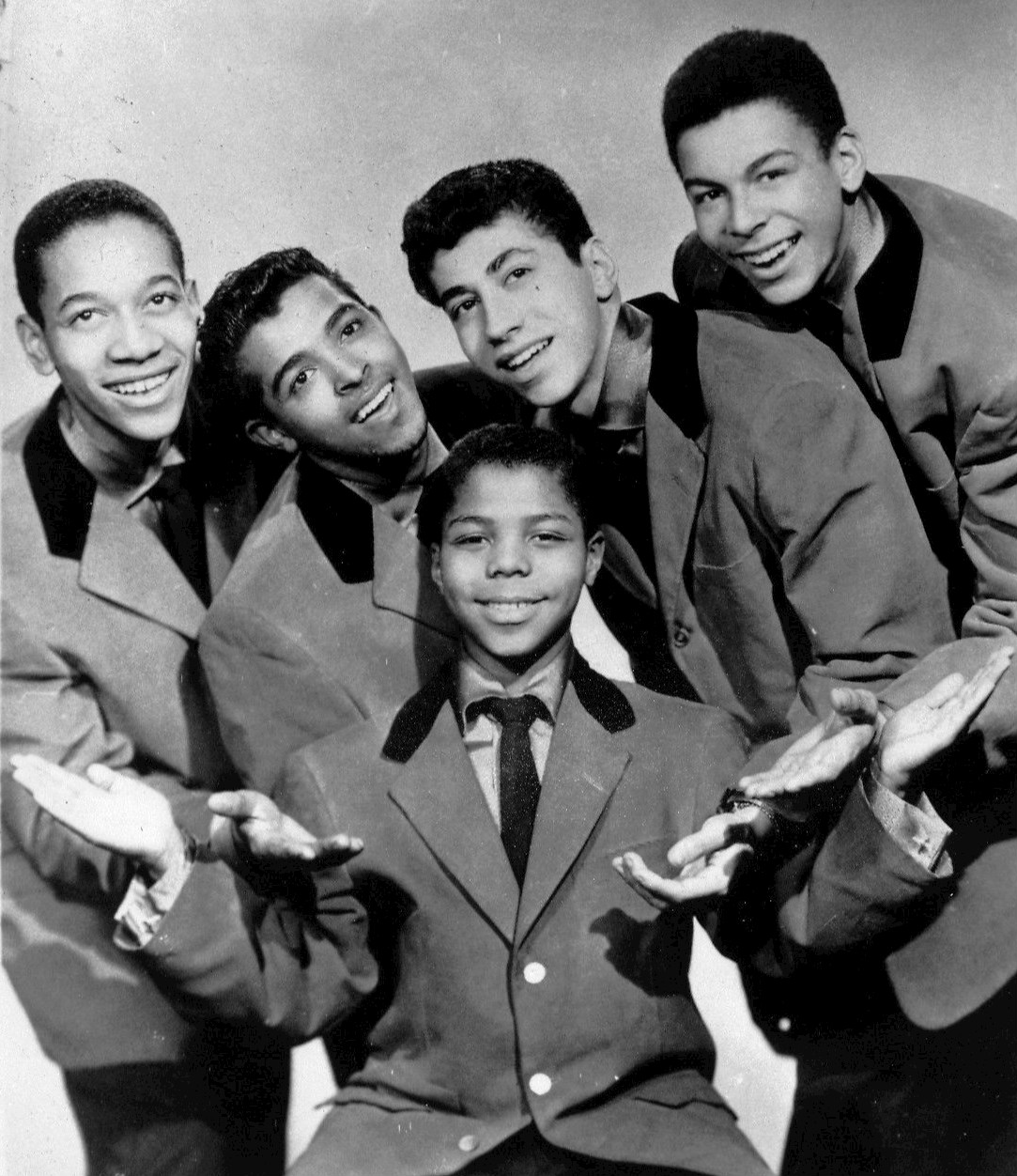
Frankie Lymon (center) and the Teenagers

At age 12 in 1954, Lymon heard a local doo-wop group known as the Coupe De Villes at a school talent show. He became friends with the lead singer Herman Santiago, and eventually became a member of the group, now calling itself both the Ermines and the Premiers. One day in 1955, a neighbor gave the Premiers several love letters that had been written to him by his girlfriend, hoping to give the boys inspiration to write their own songs. Jimmy Merchant and Santiago adapted one of the letters into a song called "Why Do Fools Fall in Love". The Premiers, now calling themselves the Teenagers, got their first shot at fame after impressing Richard Barrett, a singer with the Valentines. Barrett, in turn, got the group an audition with record producer George Goldner. On the day of the group's audition, original lead singer Santiago was late. Lymon stepped up and told Goldner that he knew the part since he helped write the song. The disc jockeys always called them "Frankie Lymon and the Teenagers".

=== 1956: "Why Do Fools Fall in Love" success ===
Goldner signed the group to Gee Records, and "Why Do Fools Fall in Love" became its first single in January 1956. The single peaked at No. 6 on the Billboard pop singles chart, and topped the Billboard R&B singles chart for five weeks. Four other top 10 R&B singles followed over the next year or so: "I Want You to Be My Girl", "I Promise to Remember", "Who Can Explain?" (the B side of "I Promise to Remember" but which charted on its own), "The ABC's of Love", and "I'm Not a Juvenile Delinquent". "I Want You To Be My Girl" gave the band its second pop hit, reaching No. 13 on the national Billboard Hot 100 chart. "Goody Goody" (written by Matty Malneck and Johnny Mercer and originally performed by Benny Goodman) was a No. 20 pop hit but did not appear on the R&B chart. The Teenagers placed two other singles in the lower half of the pop chart. With the release of "I Want You To Be My Girl", the group's second single, the Teenagers became Frankie Lymon & the Teenagers. However, the album that mostly compiled the singles released in 1956 came out under the older name: The Teenagers Featuring Frankie Lymon.

=== 1957–65: Solo career ===
In early 1957, Lymon and the Teenagers broke up while on a tour in Europe. During an engagement at the London Palladium, Goldner began pushing Lymon as a solo act, giving him solo spots in the show. Lymon began performing with backing from pre-recorded tapes. The group's last single, "Goody Goody" backed with "Creation of Love," initially retained the "Frankie Lymon & the Teenagers" credit, but they were actually solo recordings (with backing by session singers). Lymon had officially departed from the group by September 1957; an in-progress studio album called Frankie Lymon and the Teenagers at the London Palladium was instead issued as a Lymon solo release.

As a solo artist, Lymon was not nearly as successful as he had been with the Teenagers. Beginning with his second solo release, "My Girl", Lymon had moved to Roulette Records. On a July 19, 1957, episode of Alan Freed's live ABC TV show The Big Beat, Lymon began dancing with a white teenage girl while performing. His actions caused a scandal, particularly among Southern TV station owners, and The Big Beat was subsequently canceled.

Lymon's slowly declining sales fell sharply in the early 1960s. His highest-charting solo hit was a cover of Bobby Day's "Little Bitty Pretty One", which peaked at No. 58 on the Hot 100 pop chart in 1960 and which had been recorded in 1957. Addicted to heroin since he was 15, Lymon fell further into his habit and his performing career went into decline. According to Lymon in an interview with Ebony magazine in 1967, he was introduced to heroin at age 15 by a woman twice his age. In 1961, Roulette, now run by Morris Levy, ended their contract with Lymon and he entered a drug rehabilitation program. After losing Lymon, the Teenagers went through a string of replacement singers, the first of whom was Billy Lobrano. In 1960, Howard Kenny Bobo sang lead on "Tonight's the Night" with the Teenagers; later that year, Johnny Houston sang lead on two songs. The Teenagers, who had been moved by Morris Levy to End Records, were released from their contract in 1961. The Teenagers briefly reunited with Lymon in 1965, without success.

=== 1966–68: Later years ===
Over the next four years, Lymon struggled through short-lived deals with 20th Century Fox Records and Columbia Records.

Lymon appeared at the Apollo as part of a revue, adding an extended tap dance number. He recorded several live performances (such as "Melinda" in 1959), but none rose on the charts. Lymon's final television performance was on Hollywood a Go-Go in 1965, where the 22-year-old lip-synched to the recording of his 13-year-old self singing "Why Do Fools Fall in Love".

Following an arrest for heroin use in 1966, Lymon joined the United States Army in lieu of a jail sentence. However, he repeatedly went AWOL to secure gigs at small Southern clubs. Traveling to New York in 1968, Lymon was signed by manager Sam Bray to his Big Apple label, and the singer returned to recording.

Roulette Records expressed interest in releasing Lymon's records in conjunction with Big Apple and scheduled a recording session for February 28. A major promotion had been arranged with CHO Associates, owned by radio personalities Frankie Crocker, Herb Hamlett, and Eddie O'Jay. Lymon, staying at his grandmother's apartment in Harlem, where he had grown up, celebrated his good fortune with a relapse into addiction by taking heroin. Lymon had remained clean since entering the Army two years earlier.

== Personal life ==
=== Relationships ===
In the early 1960s, Lymon began a relationship with Elizabeth "Mickey" Waters, whom he later married in 1964 in Alexandria, Virginia, and who gave birth to his only child, a daughter named Francine who died two days after birth at Lenox Hill Hospital. Lymon's marriage to Waters was not legal because she was still married to her first husband, Charles Phillips, at the time. After the marriage failed, Lymon moved to Los Angeles in the mid-1960s, where he began a romantic relationship with Zola Taylor, a member of the Platters.

Taylor claimed to have married Lymon in Mexico in 1965 although their relationship ended several months later, purportedly because of Lymon's drug habits. However, Lymon was known to say that their marriage was a publicity stunt, and Taylor could produce no legal documentation of their marriage, although it was reported that the couple married in Las Vegas. In Major Robinson's gossip column of June 6, 1966, Taylor said the whole thing was a joke that she went along with at the time (October 1965).

While in Augusta, Georgia, following sentencing for heroin use, Lymon met and fell in love with Emira Eagle, a schoolteacher at Hornsby Elementary in Augusta. The two were wed in June 1967, and Lymon repeatedly went AWOL to secure gigs at small Southern clubs. Dishonorably discharged from the Army, Lymon moved into his wife's home and continued to perform sporadically.

=== Drug use ===
On June 21, 1966, Lymon was arrested on a heroin charge and was drafted into the United States Army in lieu of a jail sentence. He reported to Fort Gordon, Georgia, near Augusta, Georgia, for training, though was eventually dishonorably discharged.

== Death ==
On February 27, 1968, Lymon was found dead on the floor of his grandmother's bathroom from a heroin overdose with a syringe by his side; Lymon was only 25 years old. The overdose was a result from "acute intravenous narcotism," according to his death certificate. Lymon, a Baptist, was buried at Saint Raymond's Cemetery in the Throggs Neck section of the Bronx, New York City.

=== Tombstone ===
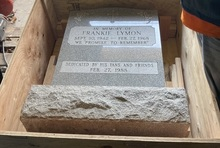
Tombstone of Frankie Lymon

In addition to his burial, Lymon has a second tombstone, exhibited at the Michigan Rock and Roll Legends Hall of Fame in the Historical Museum of Bay County, Bay City, Michigan. Initially, it was located at the backyard of Pam Nardella in Elmwood Park, New Jersey. The tombstone is made of granite, 33 inches (84 cm) high, 27 inches (69 cm) wide, 8 inches (20 cm) deep, and weighs more than 1,000 pounds (450 kg), due to the granite base. The tombstone also emphasizes with a cross and flowers.

Later, Scott and Michael Rullis from Monroe Monuments brought the tombstone to the museum at Michigan Rock and Roll Legends Hall of Fame on January 14, 2021, becoming the first artifact that arrived at the Historical Museum of Bay County. In addition to the tombstone becoming the first artifact, several Serenus Johnson crew members worked variety of construction projects at the museum while being shut down and brought the crate containing the tombstone that remained for several months. According to Mike Bacigalupo, the tombstone is "a big tell-tale story" and that people would relate with the tombstone based on its origin. The walls and floor of the gallery was repainted and the tombstone was relocated to the second floor.

=== Posthumous troubles ===
"I'm Sorry" and "Seabreeze" are the two songs that Lymon had recorded for Big Apple before his death, and they were posthumously released later in 1969. After Diana Ross returned "Why Do Fools Fall in Love" to the Top Ten in 1981, a major controversy concerning Lymon's estate ensued. Having neglected to divorce any of them and each claiming to be Frankie Lymon's rightful widow, Zola Taylor, Elizabeth Waters, and Emira Eagle approached Morris Levy, the music impresario who retained possession of Lymon's copyrights and his royalties. The complex issue resulted in lawsuits and counter-lawsuits, and in 1986 the first of several court cases concerning the ownership of Lymon's estate began.

Trying to determine who was indeed the lawful Mrs. Frankie Lymon was complicated by more issues. Waters was already married when she married Lymon; she had separated from her first husband, but their divorce was finalized in 1965, after she had married Lymon. Taylor claimed to have married Lymon in Mexico in 1965, but could produce no acceptable evidence of their union. Lymon's marriage to Eagle, on the other hand, was properly documented as having taken place at Beulah Grove Baptist Church in Augusta, Georgia, in 1967; however, the singer was still apparently twice-married and never divorced when he married Eagle. The first decision was made in Waters' favor; Eagle appealed, and in 1989, the Appellate Division of the New York State Supreme Court reversed the original decision and awarded Lymon's estate to Eagle.

However, the details of the case brought about another issue: whether mobster Morris Levy was deserving of the songwriting co-credit on "Why Do Fools Fall in Love". Although early single releases of "Why Do Fools Fall in Love" credit Frankie Lymon, Herman Santiago, and Jimmy Merchant as co-writers, later releases and cover versions were attributed to Lymon and George Goldner. When Goldner sold his music companies to Morris Levy in 1959, Levy's name began appearing as co-writer of "Why Do Fools Fall in Love" in place of Goldner's. Lymon was never paid his songwriting royalties during his lifetime; one result of Emira Eagle's legal victory was that Lymon's estate would finally begin receiving monetary compensation from his hit song's success. In 1987, Herman Santiago and Jimmy Merchant, both by then poor, sued Morris Levy's estate for their songwriting credits. In December 1992, the U.S. District Court for the Southern District of New York ruled that Santiago and Merchant were co-authors of "Why Do Fools Fall in Love". However, in 1996 the ruling was reversed by the U.S. Court of Appeals for the Second Circuit on the basis of the statute of limitations: copyright cases must be brought before a court within three years of the alleged civil violation while Merchant and Santiago's lawsuit was not filed until 30 years later. Authorship of "Why Do Fools Fall in Love" currently remains in the names of Frankie Lymon and Morris Levy.

== Legacy ==
Although their period of success was brief, Frankie Lymon & the Teenagers' string of hits were highly influential on the rock and R&B performers who followed them. Lymon's high-voiced sound is said to be a direct predecessor of the girl group sound, and the list of performers who name him as an influence include Michael Jackson, Ronnie Spector, Diana Ross, the Chantels, the Temptations, George Clinton, Smokey Robinson, Len Barry, the Beach Boys and Billy Joel, among others. The performers most inspired by and derivative of Lymon and the Teenagers' style are the Jackson 5 and their lead singer and future superstar Michael Jackson. Motown founder Berry Gordy based much of the Jackson 5's sound on Frankie Lymon & the Teenagers' recordings, and the Teenagers are believed to be the original model for many of the other Motown groups he cultivated.

In 1993, Frankie Lymon and the Teenagers were inducted into the Rock and Roll Hall of Fame and into the Vocal Group Hall of Fame in 2000.

Lymon's music and story were eventually re-introduced to modern audiences with Why Do Fools Fall in Love, a 1998 biographical film directed by Gregory Nava, also the director of the Selena biopic. Why Do Fools Fall in Love tells a comedic, fictionalized version of Lymon's story from the points of view of his three wives as they battle in court for the rights to his estate. The film stars Larenz Tate as Frankie Lymon, Halle Berry as Zola Taylor, Vivica A. Fox as Elizabeth Waters and Lela Rochon as Emira Eagle. Why Do Fools Fall in Love was not a commercial success and met with mixed reviews; the film grossed a total of $12,461,773 during its original theatrical run.

The song "Harlem Roulette" by the Mountain Goats, off its 2012 album Transcendental Youth, contains references to Frankie Lymon, to the song "Seabreeze", and to Roulette Records. Frontman John Darnielle has stated that the song is about the last night of Lymon's life.

== Discography ==
=== Frankie Lymon & the Teenagers discography ===
==== Singles ====
Gee releases

- 1956-01: [Gee 1002] "Why Do Fools Fall in Love" / "Please Be Mine" ^{1} (No. 1 on the R&B chart for 5 weeks, US Pop No. 6, UK No. 1)
- 1956-04: [Gee 1012] "I Want You to Be My Girl" / "I'm Not a Know-It-All" ^{2} (No. 3 on R&B chart, US Pop No. 13)
- 1956-07: [Gee 1018] "I Promise to Remember" / "Who Can Explain?" (double-sided hit on R&B chart (No. 10 and No. 7) (US Pop No. 57 (A-side)))
- 1956-09: [Gee 1022] "The ABC's of Love" / "Share" (No. 8 on R&B chart, US Pop No. 77)
- 1956-11: [Gee 1026] "I'm Not a Juvenile Delinquent" / "Baby, Baby" (double-sided hit on UK chart No. 12 and No. 4)
- 1957-04: [Gee 1032] "Teenage Love" / "Paper Castles"
- 1957-05: [Gee 1035] "Love Is a Clown / Am I Fooling Myself Again"
- 1957-06: [Gee 1036] "Out in the Cold Again" / "Miracle in the Rain" ^{5} (No. 10 on R&B chart)
- 1957-07: [Gee 1039] "Goody Goody" / "Creation of Love" ^{3} (US Pop No. 20, UK No. 24)
- 1957-12: [Gee 1046] "Everything to Me" / "Flip Flop" ^{4}

==== Notes ====
- ^{1} Released as by "the Teenagers"
- ² Early copies released as by "the Teenagers featuring Frankie Lymon"; billing on later pressings changed to "Frankie Lymon & the Teenagers"
- ³ Both sides of this release are actually Frankie Lymon solo recordings.
- ^{4} billed as "the Teenagers" (lead vocal by Billie Lobrano)
- ^{5} Released as by "the Teenagers featuring Frankie Lymon"

==== Album ====
- 1956: [Gee 701] The Teenagers Featuring Frankie Lymon

==== Compilations ====
- 1986: Frankie Lymon and the Teenagers: For Collectors Only (Murray Hill 148)

=== Frankie Lymon solo discography ===
==== Singles ====
Roulette releases

- 1957: [Roulette 4026] "My Girl" / "So Goes My Love"
- 1957: [Roulette 4035] "Little Girl" / "It's Christmas Once Again"
- 1958: [Roulette 4044] "Thumb Thumb" / "Footsteps"
- 1958: [Roulette 4068] "Portable on My Shoulder" / "Mama Don't Allow It" (US Pop No. 80)
- 1958: [Roulette 4093] "Only Way to Love" / "Melinda"
- 1959: [Roulette 4128] "Up Jumped a Rabbit" / "No Matter What You've Done"
- 1969: [Roulette 21095] "/ "1-20-12 Forever'

Gee release

- 1959: [Gee 1052] "Goody Good Girl" / "I'm Not Too Young to Dream"

Roulette releases

- 1960: [Roulette 4257] "Little Bitty Pretty One" / "Creation of Love" (US Pop No. 58)
- 1960: [Roulette 4283] "Buzz Buzz Buzz" / "Waitin' in School"
- 1961: [Roulette 4310] "Jailhouse Rock" / "Silhouettes" ('Jailhouse' was recorded in '58, and was taken from the 'Rock & Roll with Frankie Lymon' lp., on ' Roulette ', v.inf)
- 1961: [Roulette 4348] "Change Partners" / "So Young (And So in Love)"
- 1961: [Roulette 4391] "Young" / "I Put the Bomp" (featuring backing vocals by two members of the Delicates (Denise Ferri and Peggy Santiglia))

Later releases

- 1964: [TCF 11] "To Each His Own" / "Teacher, Teacher"
- 1964: [Columbia 4-43094] "Somewhere" / "Sweet and Lovely"
- 1969: [Big Apple 100] "I'm Sorry" / "Seabreeze"

==== Albums ====
- 1956: Frankie Lymon And the Teenagers - 1981 Re-issue Roulette Y2-116-RO (Japan) [Gee 701]
- 1957: Frankie Lymon at the London Palladium (Roulette)
- 1958: Rock & Roll with Frankie Lymon (Roulette)
- 1994: Complete Recordings (Bear Family)

== See also ==
- List of people from Harlem

== Bibliography ==
- Merchant, Jimmy (2023). A Teenager's Dream: Why Do Fools Fall in Love. Pearly Gates Publishing. ISBN 978-1-948853-65-1.
