= The Teenagers Featuring Frankie Lymon =

Studio album by The Teenagers Featuring Frankie Lymon
- Released: December 1956
- Genre: Rock and roll
- Length: 31:05
- Label: Gee

Singles from The Teenagers Featuring Frankie Lymon
- 1. "Why Do Fools Fall in Love"/"Please Be Mine" Released: January 1956; 2. "I Want You to Be My Girl"/"I'm Not a Know It All" Released: April 1956; 3. "I Promise to Remember"/"Who Can Explain?" Released: June 1956; 4. "The ABC's of Love"/"Share" Released: September 1956; 5. "I'm Not a Juvenile Delinquent"/"Baby, Baby" Released: November 1956

Professional ratings
Review scores
Source	Rating
Allmusic	4/5 stars

The Teenagers Featuring Frankie Lymon is the only album by The Teenagers Featuring Frankie Lymon and was released in 1956.

The album featured five singles with all singles charting on at least one chart and one single's B-side, "Who Can Explain?", also charting.

== Track listing ==
1. "Why Do Fools Fall in Love" (Frankie Lymon/Morris Levy) – 2:19
2. "Please Be Mine" (Lymon/Levy) – 3:08
3. "Who Can Explain" (Abner Silver/Roy Alfred) – 2:14
4. "Share" (Vic Abrams/Jimmy Merchant) – 2:39
5. "Love Is a Clown" (George Goldner) – 2:52
6. "I Promise to Remember" (Jimmy Castor/Jimmy Smith) – 2:53
7. "I Want You to Be My Girl" (Levy) – 2:58
8. "I'm Not a Know It All" (Buddy Kaye/Fred Spellman) – 2:50
9. "Baby, Baby" (Milton Subotsky) – 2:27
10. "The ABC's of Love" (Levy) – 1:57
11. "Am I Fooling Myself Again" (Levy) – 2:38
12. "I'm Not a Juvenile Delinquent" (Goldner/Levy/Merchant/Robert Spencer) – 2:39

== Personnel ==
- Frankie Lymon – lead vocals
- Joe Negroni – baritone vocals
- Sherman Garnes – bass vocals
- Herman Santiago – first tenor vocals
- Jimmy Merchant – second tenor vocals

== Charts ==
Singles

Year	Single	Chart	Position
1956	"Why Do Fools Fall in Love"	US Pop	6
1956	"Why Do Fools Fall in Love"	US R&B	1
1956	"Why Do Fools Fall in Love"	UK	1
1956	"I Want You to Be My Girl"	US Pop	13
1956	"I Want You to Be My Girl"	US R&B	3
1956	"I Promise to Remember"	US Pop	57
1956	"I Promise to Remember"	US R&B	10
1956	"Who Can Explain?"	US R&B	7
1956	"The ABC's of Love"	US Pop	77
1956	"The ABC's of Love"	US R&B	8
1957	"I'm Not a Juvenile Delinquent"	UK	12
1957	"Baby, Baby"	UK	4
