= I'm Not a Juvenile Delinquent =

1956 single by Frankie Lymon and the Teenagers

- 45 RPM single version

Single by Frankie Lymon and the Teenagers

from the album The Teenagers Featuring Frankie Lymon
- B-side: "Baby, Baby"
- Released: November 1956 (US version); February 1957 (UK versions)
- Recorded: August–October 1956
- Genre: Doo wop; rock and roll
- Length: 2:38 (single and Columbia release); 2:48 (stereo release)
- Label: Gee
- Songwriters: George Goldner; Jimmy Merchant, assisted by Robert Spencer

Frankie Lymon and the Teenagers singles chronology
"The ABC's of Love" (1956)	"I'm Not a Juvenile Delinquent" (1956)	"Teenage Love" (1957)

Music video
- "I'm Not a Juvenile Delinquent" on YouTube

"I'm Not a Juvenile Delinquent" is a song written by George Goldner and performed by Frankie Lymon and the Teenagers for the 1956 film Rock, Rock, Rock!, which also appeared on the soundtrack for the film's 50th anniversary. It reached number 12 on the UK Singles Chart in April 1957. It was released in November 1956 in the US and February 1957 in the UK, and is the last song featured on the 1956 album The Teenagers Featuring Frankie Lymon.

An 18-second audio sample of "I'm Not A Juvenile Delinquent" that demonstrates Frankie Lymon's memorable opening line which he utters "no" 19 times.

== Background ==
The song was originally written by Jimmy Merchant with the help of his older songwriter friend Robert Spencer (later finalized by Goldner). According to Merchant, it is notably the first protest song ever released by the Teenagers. Merchant described that the "words [of this song] object to being labeled as 'bad', but eclipse with a strong, uplifting truth in its opening line."

The Teenagers (including Sherman Garnes, Merchant, Joe Negroni, and Herman Santiago) recorded their harmony on August 4, 1956, without Frankie Lymon. Two months later, Lymon was brought into overdub as a lead singer. In addition to the Teenagers' versions and Lymon's overdub, Merchant primarily constructed the harmony background.

=== Possible occurrences leading to the song's composition ===
Although not confirmed, there are possibilities that lead to the composition of the song.

This song is mainly concerned with the widespread of juvenile delinquency in United States, particularly in 1954 to 1956. Concerning moral panic, there were media portrayals of juvenile delinquency in films that include Blackboard Jungle and Rebel Without a Cause. Metro-Goldwyn-Mayer (MGM) released Blackboard Jungle in 1955, the same year Rebel Without a Cause was released. Due to its release, Blackboard Jungle aroused controversies because integrated schools were believed to be the "environment of switchblade knives, marijuana, stabbings, rapes, violence, and blackboard jungles," and they were associated with belligerent males depicted in the movie. On the other hand, Rebel Without a Cause demonstrates that "juveniles presented a significant threat" during post-World War II era. Moral panic and media portrayals regarding juvenile delinquency in 1950s are possibly the factors of the song being made.

Besides moral panic and media portrayals, the insight into "I'm Not A Juvenile Delinquent" is mainly concerned on how rock and roll was incorporated in American society. The term "juvenile delinquent" was previously unknown in Britain. However, it was easily translated into the perception of a threat perpetrated by teenagers, which revealed adults as "judgmental and wrong." Regarding the insight, the Teenagers were known for their harmony along with integrated collaboration. They confronted "racist assumptions that tied delinquency to inner-city non-whites." Despite losing out on a contract, the Teenagers resisted their breakup pursued by record executives they encountered in addition to challenging racist assumptions.

== Rock, Rock, Rock! ==
Filmed in Mikaro Studios (near botanical gardens) at Bedford Park, Bronx, New York, Frankie Lymon and the Teenagers were on Rock, Rock, Rock! set performing on stage, dancing and apparently lip-syncing to the song in front of the audience.

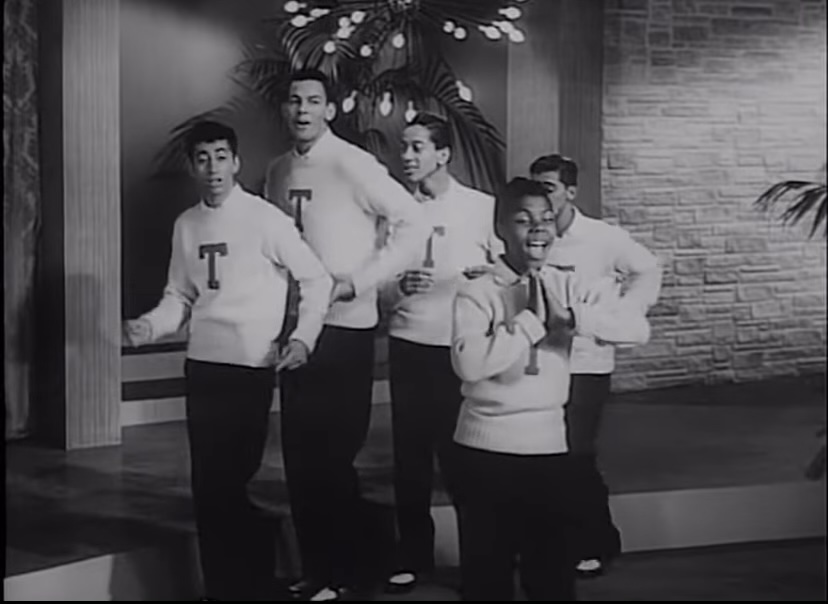
Negroni, Garnes, Merchant, Lymon, and Santiago (from left to right) seen dancing to the song "I'm Not a Juvenile Delinquent" on Rock, Rock, Rock set.

=== Synopsis ===
A black-and-white video begins with Garnes extending his thumb toward his chest, uttering "I'm not a juvenile delinquent." After Garnes's opening, the video zooms out to show the rest of boys swinging their arms back and forth, and lifting their knees to do a walking motion in place rhythmically (accompanied by Negroni, Merchant, and Santiago); then it also reveals Lymon gesturing, especially the prayer hands. They are performing their dance almost the entire duration until the song ends, which results in the video slowly zooming into Lymon making a prayer gesture. While the audience is applauding and cheering for them, the boys conclude their performance with a smile and a pose, which they are seen pressing both index fingers to their cheeks, bending their knees with one foot in front of other, and then making prayer hands.

== Lyrics ==
The song begins with Lymon saying "no" 19 times after Garnes sings "I'm not a juvenile delinquent" once in the beginning, and 22 times when the former chants "I'm not a juvenile" twice and after that in the end.

The first-person narrative assumes the role of a person, presumably a boy, who is given an advice on making a right choice, and has a potential to "be in paradise." However, the boy acknowledges it and assures that he is not a juvenile delinquent throughout the song.

While stating that he is not a juvenile delinquent, the boy chants, quoting "It's easy to be good, it's hard to be bad / Stay out of trouble, and you['ll] be glad / Take this tip from me, and you will see / How happy you will be."

== Radio station broadcast ==
In early 1957, the British were fascinated by "I'm Not A Juvenile Delinquent" playing on radio stations that they "loved" it. Therefore, it peaked number 12 on April. However, on the other hand, the broadcasting of the song in the United States was canceled and it "failed to chart," although the Teenagers were Americans.

== Charts ==
Chart (1957)	Peak position
UK Singles (Official Charts)	12

== Other versions ==
- The Amboy Dukes released a version of the song on their 1969 album, Migration.

== Legacy ==
This song is featured in the 1972 film Pink Flamingos in a scene when Divine is seen purchasing a steak and putting it under her dress while running errands, and also the 1993 movie This Boy's Life when Toby (Leonardo DiCaprio) is seen exiting the building, styling his hair with a hair gel while looking into a window, walking with and hanging out with a teenage boy asking and talking about skipping schools and making out. It is also featured in the episode of The Young Ones titled "Bomb" when Rick (Rik Mayall), wearing a British Army barrack dress, is seen walking and then taunting a law enforcement officer looking away by flashing the V shape to him.

== Bibliography ==
- Gilbert, James (1988). Cycle of Outrage. Oxford University Press. ISBN 0-19-505641-8.
- Goode, Erich (2017). "Moral Panic". The Encyclopedia of Juvenile Delinquency and Justice. pp. 1–3. doi:10.1002/9781118524275.ejdj0054. ISBN 978-1-118-52032-1.
- Kuperstein, Harry (2016). Rebel Without a Cause and Juvenile Delinquency Hysteria.
- Merchant, Jimmy (2023). A Teenager's Dream: Why Do Fools Fall in Love. Pearly Gates Publishing. ISBN 978-1-948853-65-1.
- Taylor, Peter (2019). What Would Calverton Do? (PDF). Peter J Taylor.
- Walker, Anders (2010). Blackboard Jungle: Delinquency, Desegregation, and the Cultural Politics of Brown.
- Warner, Jay (2006). American Singing Groups. Hal Leonard Corporation. ISBN 0634099787.
