= Who Can Explain? =

1956 single by Frankie Lymon and The Teenagers

Single by Frankie Lymon and The Teenagers

from the album The Teenagers Featuring Frankie Lymon
- A-side: "I Promise to Remember"
- Released: June 1956
- Genre: Rock and roll
- Length: 2:40
- Label: Gee
- Songwriter(s): Abner Silver, Roy Alfred

Frankie Lymon and The Teenagers singles chronology
"I Want You to Be My Girl" (1956)	"Who Can Explain?" (1956)	"The ABC's of Love" (1956)

"Who Can Explain?" is a song written by Abner Silver and Roy Alfred and performed by Frankie Lymon and The Teenagers featuring Jimmy Wright and His Orchestra. It reached #7 on the US R&B chart in 1956. The song was featured on their 1956 album, The Teenagers Featuring Frankie Lymon.

The single's A-side, "I Promise to Remember", reached #10 on the US R&B chart and #57 on the Billboard pop chart.
