= The Teenagers =

American doo-wop group

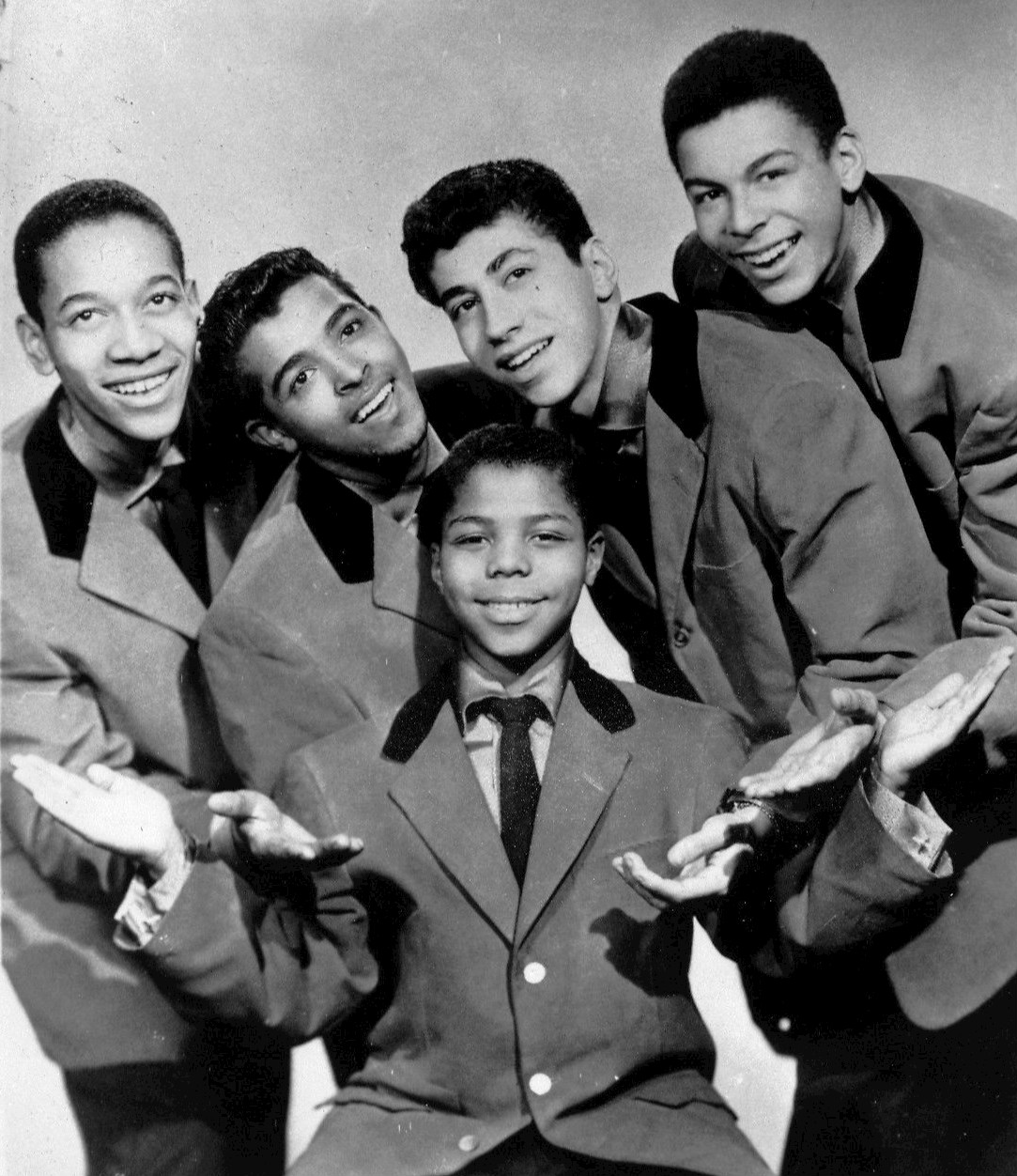
- The original five Teenagers in 1956; from left to right: Jimmy Merchant, Herman Santiago, Frankie Lymon, Joe Negroni and Sherman Garnes.

Background information
- Also known as: The Coup De Villes, The Earth Angels, The Ermines, The Premiers, Frankie Lymon & the Teenagers
- Origin: Harlem, New York City, New York, United States
- Genres: Doo-wop; rock and roll; rhythm & blues
- Years active: 1954–2020
- Labels: Gee, Roulette, End
- Past members: Frankie Lymon †; Jimmy Castor †; Joe Negroni †; Sherman Garnes †; Billy Lobrano †; Johnny Houston; Lewis Lymon †; John Seda; Derek Ventura; Dickie Harmon; Timothy Wilson; Pearl McKinnon; Phil Garrito; Marilyn Byers; Roz Morehead; Eric Ward; Thomas Lockhart: Bobby Jay; Herman Santiago; Jimmy Merchant; Terrance Farward; Terry King; Joseph Rivera; Donald McCall

The Teenagers were an American doo-wop music group, most noted for being one of rock music's earliest successes, presented to international audiences by DJ Alan Freed. The group, which made its most popular recordings with young 13-year-old Frankie Lymon as lead singer, is also noted for being rock's first all-teenaged act. They were inducted into the Rock and Roll Hall of Fame in 1993.

Frankie Lymon was the first teenage black pop star and led young black R&B artists (such as Michael Jackson and Stevie Wonder) to hit the charts. In 1956, they released “Why Do Fools Fall In Love”, topping at No. 7 on the Billboard Hot 100.

== History ==
The Teenagers had their origins in the Earth Angels, a group founded at Edward W. Stitt Junior High School in the Washington Heights section of Manhattan by second tenor Jimmy Merchant and bass Sherman Garnes. Eventually, Garnes and Merchant had added lead singer Herman Santiago and baritone Joe Negroni to their lineup and evolved into The Coupe De Villes. In 1954, 12-year-old Frankie Lymon joined the Coupe De Villes, who changed their name to first the Ermines and later the Premiers.

The same year Lymon joined the group, he helped Santiago and Merchant rewrite a song they had composed to create "Why Do Fools Fall In Love". The song got the Teenagers an audition with George Goldner's Gee Records, but Santiago was too sick to sing lead on the day of the audition. Lymon sang the lead on "Why Do Fools Fall in Love" instead, and the group was signed to Gee as The Teenagers, with Lymon as lead singer.

"Why Do Fools Fall in Love" was the Teenagers' first and biggest hit. The group, known for both their harmony and choreography, also had hits with "I'm Not a Juvenile Delinquent" and "The ABC's of Love".

By 1957, the group was being billed as "Frankie Lymon and the Teenagers". This caused in-fighting, and by September, Goldner had pulled Lymon out of the group to record solo. Lymon had little success as a solo artist. He became a heroin addict at the age of 15 and his sales dropped quickly in the early 1960s. In 1966, he stopped using heroin after being forced to go to the army, but on February 27, 1968, he decided to celebrate his good fortune by taking heroin (he was planning to launch a comeback) and died of a heroin overdose at the age of 25 on the floor of his grandmother's bathroom. He had been clean since entering the army two years earlier. The Teenagers continued recording, bringing in a new lead. Billy Lobrano, as the group's first non-Hispanic white member, made them more ethnically mixed, now with two non-Hispanic black, one non-Hispanic white, and two Hispanic members. The group had little success with Lobrano, and he left. Sherman Garnes died of a heart attack in 1977, while Joe Negroni died a year later due to a cerebral hemorrhage. Their replacements were Bobby Jay and Frankie's brother Lewis Lymon, respectively.

In the 1980s, the Teenagers had resorted to using a female singer to imitate Lymon's prepubescent voice, and Pearl McKinnon joined the band. The members at that time were Jimmy Merchant, Herman Santiago, Eric Ward, and Pearl McKinnon. By 1983, Ward had been replaced by Derek Ventura, and in 1984, Phil Garrito took over for Ventura. Roz Morehead replaced McKinnon, and Marilyn Byers moved into Morehead's lead spot. Later in the 1980s, the group had settled on a new lead, Jimmy Castor. Castor remained lead until the 1990s, when he was replaced by Timothy Wilson, former lead of Tiny Tim and the Hits. This line-up appeared on the PBS special Doo Wop 51 in 2000.

The group is no longer performing as of 2020.

== Frankie Lymon & the Teenagers discography ==
=== Albums ===
Year	Album	Record label
1956	The Teenagers Featuring Frankie Lymon	Gee Records

=== Singles ===
Year	Title	Peak chart positions			Record Label	B-side	Album
Year	Title	US Pop	US R&B	UK	Record Label	B-side	Album
1956	"Why Do Fools Fall in Love" ^{1}	6	1	1	Gee Records	"Please Be Mine"	The Teenagers; Featuring Frankie Lymon
1956	"I Want You to Be My Girl" ^{2}	13	3	—	Gee Records	"I'm Not a Know It All"	The Teenagers; Featuring Frankie Lymon
1956	"I Promise to Remember"	57	10	—	Gee Records	"Who Can Explain?" (R&B #7)	The Teenagers; Featuring Frankie Lymon
1956	"The ABC's of Love"	77	8	—	Gee Records	"Share"	The Teenagers; Featuring Frankie Lymon
1956	"I'm Not a Juvenile Delinquent"	—	—	12	Gee Records	"Baby, Baby" (UK #4)	The Teenagers; Featuring Frankie Lymon
1957	"Teenage Love"	—	—	—	Gee Records	"Paper Castles"	
1957	"Out in the Cold Again" ^{1}	—	10	—	Gee Records	"Miracle in the Rain"	
1957	"Goody Goody" ^{3}	20	—	24	Gee Records	"Creation of Love"	
1957	"Everything to Me"	—	—	—	Gee Records	"Flip-Flop"	Lead Vocals by Billy Lobrano
1958	"My Broken Heart"	—	—	—	Roulette Records	"Mama Wanna Rock"	
1960	"Can You Tell Me"	—	—	—	End Records	"A Little Wiser Now"	Featuring Freddie Houston
1963	"The Lemon-Twist Dance"	—	—	—	Tahoe Records	"The Twisting Rhumba"	
1989	"Why Do Fools Fall in Love"	—	—	84	N/A		Re-release
"—" denotes releases that did not chart or were not released in that territory.

Notes:

- ^{1} Released as by "The Teenagers featuring Frankie Lymon"
- ^{2} Early copies released as by "The Teenagers featuring Frankie Lymon"; billing on later pressings changed to "Frankie Lymon & the Teenagers"
- ^{3} Frankie Lymon solo recordings released under the group's name

=== Films ===
- Rock, Rock, Rock, 1956, with Chuck Berry, the Moonglows, and the Flamingos.
