= Goody Goody =

Original song composed by Matty Malneck, lyrics by Johnny Mercer

"Goody Goody" is a 1936 popular song composed by Matty Malneck, with lyrics by Johnny Mercer. The first recording of the song was by Ted Wallace and His Swing Kings (vocal refrain by male trio) [Bluebird, B-6252-B, 1936].

The lyrics are about a smug woman who relishes the situation when she sees the man who treated her badly get dumped by a new woman. It includes the phrase, "you rascal you," which in 1936 was not referring to a playful imp but was tantamount to calling someone a scoundrel, or dastardly.

== Other 1936 recordings ==
Other popular recordings in 1936 were by Benny Goodman and his Orchestra (with vocalist Helen Ward), Freddy Martin & His Orchestra (vocal by Terry Shand), and by Bob Crosby & His Orchestra.

== Frankie Lymon recording ==
"Goody Goody"

Single by Frankie Lymon
- B-side: "Creation of Love"
- Released: July 1957
- Recorded: 1957
- Genre: Pop
- Length: 2:04
- Label: Gee
- Songwriters: Matty Malneck, Johnny Mercer

Frankie Lymon singles chronology
| "Out in the Cold Again" (1957) | "Goody Goody" (1957) | "Everything to Me" (1957) |

Frankie Lymon performed it live on television on several occasions, including twice in 1957 on The Ed Sullivan Show. He also had a hit with his recording of the song in the United States, reaching #20 that year, as well as #24 in the UK. It was released as a recording with his group the Teenagers, but was, in fact, a solo recording.

=== Chart performance ===
| Chart (1957) | Peak position |
|---|---|
| UK Singles Chart | 24 |
| US Billboard Top 100 | 20 |

== Other notable recordings ==
- Teddy Stauffer & the Original Teddies (1936)
- Peggy Lee, early 1950s
- Mel Torme - Gene Norman Presents Mel Torme At The Crescendo (1955)
- Ella Fitzgerald – Ella at the Opera House (1957), Get Happy! (1959)
- Julie London – Julie Is Her Name, Volume II (1958)
- Della Reese – Della (1960)
- Helen Shapiro - Helen (1961)
- Frank Sinatra – Sinatra and Swingin' Brass (1962)
- Kimiko Kasai – In Person, (1973)
- Robert "Goodie" Whitfield - Call Me Goodie (1982)
- Rosemary Clooney – Rosemary Clooney Sings the Lyrics of Johnny Mercer (1987)
- Chicago – Night & Day Big Band (1995)
- Camille O'Sullivan – performed the song, with Will Young, in the 2005 Academy Award- and Golden Globe-nominated film Mrs. Henderson Presents, starring Dame Judi Dench, Bob Hoskins and Will Young. The movie's soundtrack was nominated for the BAFTA Award for Best Film Music.
- Tony Bennett and Lady Gaga – Cheek to Cheek (2014)
- Freak Kitchen – Cooking with Pagans (2014)
- Beau Monga – X-Factor NZ (2015)

== Popular culture ==
- The song is referenced several times in the 1936 Kaufman and Hart play You Can't Take It with You.
- Harriet Nelson performs the song in a song-and-dance number in a December 1957 episode of The Adventures of Ozzie and Harriet called "Tutti Frutti Ice Cream" (S06•E10).
- Shelley Winters's character in Curtis Harrington's 1971 thriller What's the Matter with Helen? plays the song at the end of the movie.
- The song was performed by 'Wayne & Wanda' in an episode of The Muppet Show.
- A recording by the BBC Dance Orchestra was featured in the film The Water Horse: Legend of the Deep (2007).
- Bobby Rydell performed the song at his live shows (Las Vegas, 2015).
