= Lillian Leach =

American singer

Lillian Leach Boyd

Background information
- Born: Lillian Leach; December 20, 1936; Harlem, New York City
- Died: April 26, 2013 (aged 76) The Bronx, New York City
- Genres: Doo-wop
- Occupation: Singer
- Instrument: Vocals
- Years active: 1950s–2000s
- Labels: Jay-Dee, Celeste, Candlelight

Lillian Leach (December 20, 1936 – April 26, 2013), also known by her married name, Lillian Leach Boyd, was an American singer who performed lead vocals with the Bronx-based doo-wop group the Mellows. She was noted for her mellifluous voice and wistful singing style. The Mellows recorded several hit songs in the 1950s, including "Smoke From Your Cigarette", "Yesterday's Memories", and "How Sentimental Can I Be?"

== Life and career ==
Leach was born in Harlem and grew up in the Morrisania neighborhood of the Bronx in New York City. As a child she sang in church and in talent shows. In 1953, at the age of 16, she met Harold Johnson, John Wilson and Norman "Polecat" Brown at a party; they were singing in harmony, and she joined in. When the young men asked her to join their singing group, she was shocked: "Girls didn't sing in the groups then. It was for the boys."

The group, named the Mellows because of their preference for ballads, recorded four singles on the Jay-Dee label in 1954. One song from this period, "Smoke From Your Cigarette", was played regularly on Alan Freed's radio show and made the New York R&B Top 10 list in 1955. Another, "I Still Care", was written by Leach, her first and only songwriting credit. The group also performed live at local venues, including Harlem's Club Baby Grand. Leach suffered from severe stage fright, and had to drink to calm her nerves before performing.

The group switched to the Celeste label in 1955 and were joined by Arthur Crier and Gary Morrison. After recording two more singles, and quite a few songs that were never released, they switched labels again: this time to Candlelight, where things only got worse. Leach's name was misprinted as "Lillian Lee" on the group's first single with Candlelight. On their second, Leach was reduced to singing backup for Carl Spencer. Finally, in 1958, the Mellows recorded two more tracks for Apollo Records, "So Strange" and "Be Mine", which were never released. With almost nothing to show for their years of hard work, the group broke up in 1958.

Leach gave up singing and went to work in a factory on 134th Street. A few years later she left to become a housewife and raise her son, Sean. Then in 1984 she was persuaded to rejoin the Mellows, with a new lineup that included Arthur Crier, Eugene Tompkins, and Gary Morrison (who was later replaced by Sammy Fain). The group performed at a variety of venues over the next twenty years, including Radio City Music Hall in 1984 and the Apollo Theater in 1987. In 1985 they coordinated the production of "Don't Let Them Starve", a benefit recording that included dozens of R&B artists. In 1994 Leach joined the Morrisania Revue along with other performers from the area.

Leach's last public performance was in 2006, backed by the Cliftonaires, at a United in Group Harmony Association (UGHA) show. She died of lung cancer in 2013.

== Influence ==
As one of the few female doo-wop singers in the 1950s, Leach helped pave the way for female singers in soul and R&B, and has often been cited as an influence by later artists such as the Chantels and the Shirelles. She is described in Notable Moments of Women in Music as "one of the premier R&B lead singers of the fifties".

Rock musician Lou Reed, a lifelong doo-wop fan, was enthusiastic in his praise of Leach and the Mellows. In a 2011 Rolling Stone article, Reed included "Smoke From Your Cigarette" at the top of his list of favorite songs, adding, "Lillian Leach has a beautiful, sad voice, like a femme fatale." He mentioned the song in his speech when he inducted Dion into the Rock and Roll Hall of Fame in 1989. In a later interview, looking back at his early career, he said, "Everyone was going crazy over old blues people, but they forgot about all those groups, like the Spaniels, people like that. Records like 'Smoke From Your Cigarette,' and 'I Need a Sunday Kind of Love,' the 'Wind' by the Jesters, 'Later for You, Baby' by the Solitaires. All those really ferocious records that no one seemed to listen to anymore were underneath everything we were playing. No one really knew that."

Although the Mellows never had a national chart hit, several of their songs have become doo-wop classics over the years. Leach and the Mellows were featured in Voices of Doo-Wop, a 1994 National Geographic Explorer documentary on doo-wop music.

== Discography ==
- "How Sentimental Can I Be?"/"Nothin' To Do", 1954, Jay-Dee Records
- "Smoke From Your Cigarette"/"Pretty Baby What's Your Name", 1955, Jay-Dee Records
- "I Was A Fool To Let You Go"/"I Still Care", 1955, Jay-Dee Records
- "Yesterday's Memories"/"Lovable Lily", 1955, Jay-Dee Records
- "My Darling"/"Lucky Guy", 1956, Celeste
- "I'm Yours"/"Sweet Lorraine", 1956, Celeste
- "Moon Of Silver"/"You've Gone", 1956, Candlelight (as Lillian Lee)
- "Farewell, Farewell"/"No More Loneliness" (with Carl Spencer), 1957, Candlelight
- The Mellows: Live In Concert, 2003, Tri-Track CD
