= I Want You to Be My Girl =

1956 single by The Teenagers featuring Frankie Lymon

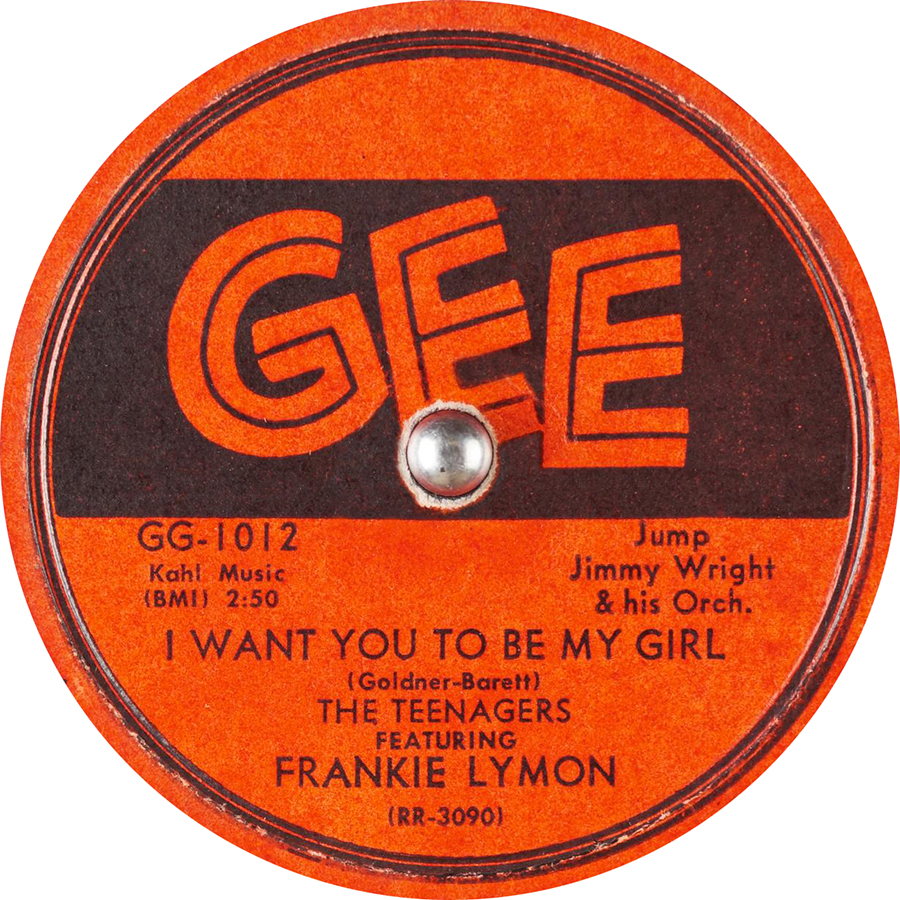

Single by The Teenagers featuring Frankie Lymon

from the album The Teenagers Featuring Frankie Lymon
- B-side: "I'm Not a Know It All"
- Released: April 1956
- Genre: Rock and roll
- Length: 2:50
- Label: Gee
- Songwriter(s): George Goldner, Richard Barrett

The Teenagers featuring Frankie Lymon singles chronology
"Why Do Fools Fall in Love" (1956)	"I Want You to Be My Girl" (1956)	"I Promise to Remember" / "Who Can Explain?" (1956)

"I Want You to Be My Girl" is a song written by George Goldner and Richard Barrett and performed by The Teenagers featuring Frankie Lymon. It reached #3 on the U.S. R&B chart and #13 on the Billboard pop chart in 1956. The song was featured on their 1956 album, The Teenagers Featuring Frankie Lymon.

== Other versions ==
- The Exciters released a version of the song as a single in 1965 entitled "I Want You to Be My Boy" that reached #98 on the Billboard pop chart.
