= Johnny Keyes and the Magnificents =

Johnny Keyes and the Magnificents were a Chicago doo wop group from the 1950s. The group sometimes backed up Harvey Fuqua as The Moonglows and Hal Miller as The Rays.

The members of the group Johnny Keyes (tenor lead), Thurman "Ray" Ramsey (tenor), Fred Rakestraw (tenor), and Willie Myles (bass), were mentored by a local disc jockey, The Magnificent Montague. The group's first session in January 1956 yielded the group's only hit single, "Up on the Mountain". It went to #9 on the Billboard R&B chart. "Why Did She Go" was also recorded at the same session.

On July 13, 1956, the Magnificents returned for a second session, but all four sides were rejected. A few days later all four numbers were re-recorded, leading to two singles, "Caddy Bo" and "Off the Mountain". Montague thought a change was needed in the group, mainly the additional sound of a female voice. The new members were Barbara Arrington and L. C. Cooke, brother of Sam Cooke, and Ray Ramsey left. Arrington sang lead on "Caddy Bo" (Vee-Jay 208), which was released in August 1956, and Keyes sang lead on "Off the Mountain" (Vee-Jay 235), which saw release in January 1957.

The Magnificents sang "Caddy Bo", with Sophia Wolff singing the part of Barbara Arrington, and backed by the Crown Vics, in Chicago, on May 16, 2009, at the Be Bop Battlin' Ball at Hubcaps. The group still featured original member Keyes.
