= The Blentones =

American doo-wop group

The Blentones were a mid-20th century doo-wop group, based in Baltimore, where they recorded with Jack Gale. Their songs include 1959's hit "Military Kick", "Lilly" and "Come On Home" on the Success record label. They also worked with Charlie Ventura.
