= Herman Santiago =

Puerto Rican-born American singer (born 1941)

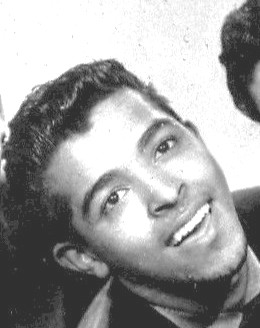
- Santiago in 1956

Background information
- Born: Herman Santiago; February 18, 1941 (age 85); San Juan, Puerto Rico
- Origin: Manhattan, New York
- Genres: Rock and Roll, doo-wop
- Occupation: Singer
- Years active: 1954–present
- Label: Gee
- Formerly of: The Teenagers

Herman Santiago (born February 18, 1941) is a Puerto Rican-born American rock and roll pioneer and songwriter who was a member of the vocal group Frankie Lymon and the Teenagers. He (disputedly) co-wrote the group's iconic hit "Why Do Fools Fall in Love".

== Early years ==
Santiago was born in San Juan, Puerto Rico and raised in Manhattan, New York. In the early 1950s, Santiago and friends, 2nd tenor Jimmy Merchant, baritone and fellow Puerto Rican Joe Negroni, and bassman Sherman Garnes, would meet in front of Santiago's apartment stoop (building stairs) and sing songs to the beat of the Doo-Wop genre. They originally called themselves the "Ermines" and Santiago was their lead singer. On one occasion, the "Ermines" participated in a talent show at PS 143 (Public School 143), at which another group, "The Cadillacs" were guests. After the show, in honor of the "Cadillacs", they changed their name to the "Coupe de Villes." This name only lasted a short time and they soon changed it to the "Premiers."

In 1954, 12-year-old Frankie Lymon, who sang with his brothers Lewis and Howie, was working in a grocery store as a bag boy. He met the "Premiers" backstage at an amateur show and "jammed" with them. Lymon was quickly invited to join them, initially singing first tenor behind Santiago's lead. That same year Richard Barrett, a talent scout and producer for Rama Records (and also the lead singer of the "Valentines"), heard them singing and introduced them to George Goldner, the record company's owner. Goldner signed them to a contract and changed the group's name once more, this time to The Teenagers.

== "Why Do Fools Fall in Love" ==
The following day, the group was supposed to meet with Goldner in the studio for a recording session. Santiago had a sore throat and could not sing the lead vocal of the song he had written, "Why Do Fools Fall in Love," and therefore, gave Negroni the music sheet with the words to the song. Lymon filled in for Santiago, but according to Jimmy Merchant, once Lymon became an established member of the group, his vocal talent and instinctive stage presence made him the obvious choice to be the group's lead vocalist, and Santiago stepped aside.

== Frankie Lymon and the Teenagers ==
Goldner released the record, with "Please Be Mine" on the "B" side, under the name "Frankie Lymon and the Teenagers", on his new "Gee Records" subsidiary, in January 1956. The record became an instant hit in the U.S and the U.K. It also became the first top British hit by an American rock & roll vocal group. Single releases followed at 3-month intervals, the next three, "I Want You to Be My Girl", "I Promise to Remember"—written by Jimmy Castor—and "The ABC's of Love" all making the charts, but at progressively lower positions. "I'm Not a Juvenile Delinquent" b/w "Share", and "Out in the Cold Again", released in early 1957, did not chart. In London, the group played at the Palladium. Alan Freed, a former American disc-jockey who became internationally known for promoting African-American rhythm and blues music, signed them for two movies, Rock, Rock, Rock and Mister Rock and Roll.

== Lymon goes solo ==
External audio
- You may view a performance by the Teenagers with Herman Santiago and listen to their version of "Why Do Fools Fall in Love?" on YouTube
- and to the original version with Frankie Lymon on YouTube.

In 1957, Lymon left "the Teenagers" permanently and went solo. The rest of the group continued touring and producing records without him until 1961, recruiting various lead singers, never achieving their previous commercial success. After the group dissolved, Santiago and the other members took regular jobs.

The surviving members of the group reunited in the 1970s, with Pearl McKinnon of the Kodaks (who sounds remarkably like Lymon) singing lead for a time. Garnes died from a heart attack in 1977 and Negroni from a cerebral hemorrhage on September 5, 1978. Santiago and Merchant continued on with various new members including most notably Jimmy Castor, Lewis Lymon (Frankie's brother), and Timothy Wilson of Tiny Tim & the Hits, their most recent lead singer. As of 2005, Jimmy Merchant has retired.

== Controversy ==
In 1981, Diana Ross recorded a new version of "Why Do Fools Fall in Love", which again became a hit and the royalties on the song passed over a million dollars.

In 1986, three women, each claiming to be Lymon's widow, filed a lawsuit in New York's Superior Court claiming the rights to the song. It was revealed that Goldner conned "the Teenagers" into signing a contract which was not valid by law and that the song was in fact written by Herman Santiago and that he (Goldner) had received all of the royalties and that Santiago never received a cent as author of the song; the Court then ruled that none of the widows were entitled to the rights of the song.

In December 1992, the U.S. federal court ruled that the rights to the song belonged to Herman Santiago and that Jimmy Merchant and Emira Lymon (the true widow) were also entitled to receive royalties dating back to 1969. Herman Santiago was by now homeless and living in a car when he received the news and soon went from being homeless to becoming a millionaire.

However, in 1996 the ruling was reversed by the Court of Appeals for the 2nd Circuit (on the basis of the statute of limitations), and authorship of "Why Do Fools Fall in Love" currently remains solely in the names of Frankie Lymon and music publisher Morris Levy. The song is currently owned by EMI Music Publishing.

== Hall of Fame ==
In 1993, the original members of "the Teenagers"—Herman Santiago, Frankie Lymon, Sherman Garnes, Joe Negroni and Jimmy Merchant—were inducted into the Rock and Roll Hall of Fame and in 2000 into the Vocal Group Hall of Fame. In the 1998 film Why Do Fools Fall in Love, the role of Santiago was played by actor Alexis Cruz.

== See also ==
- List of Puerto Rican songwriters
- List of Puerto Ricans
