= Why Do Fools Fall in Love (song) =

1956 single by Frankie Lymon and The Teenagers

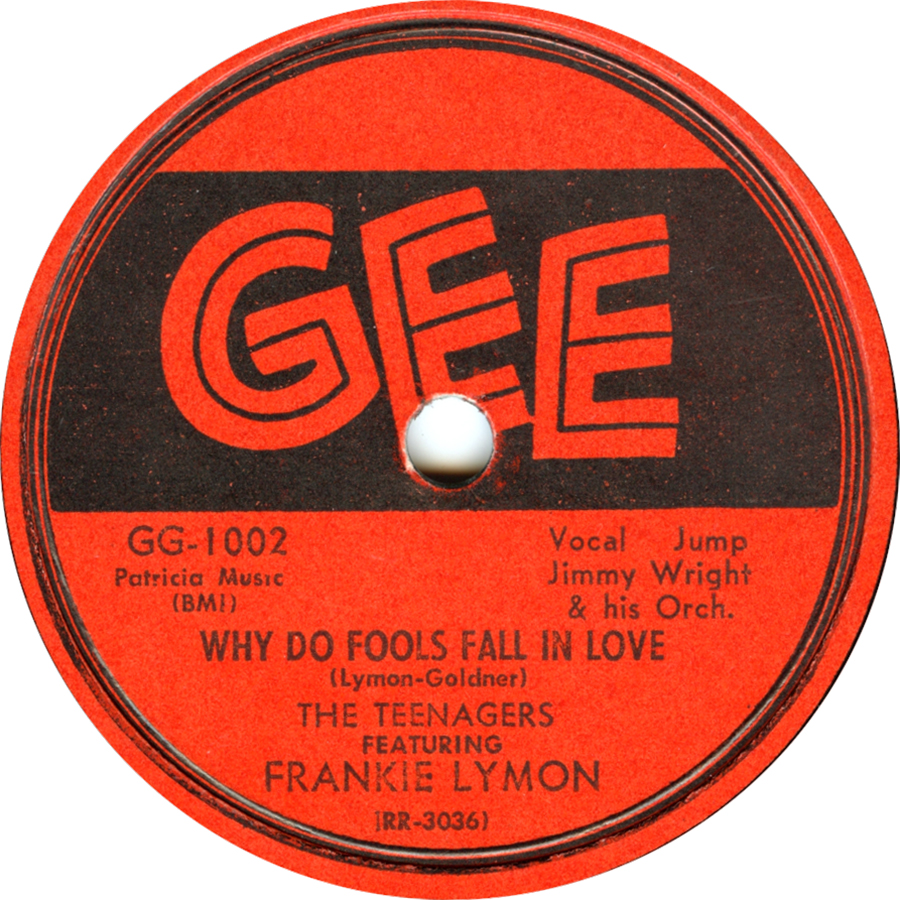

Single by Frankie Lymon & the Teenagers

from the album The Teenagers Featuring Frankie Lymon
- B-side: "Please Be Mine"
- Released: January 10, 1956
- Recorded: November 1955
- Genre: Doo-wop, rock and roll
- Length: 2:20
- Label: Gee
- Songwriters: Frankie Lymon, Herman Santiago, Jimmy Merchant
- Producer: George Goldner

Frankie Lymon & the Teenagers singles chronology
"Why Do Fools Fall in Love" (1956)	"I Want You to Be My Girl" (1956)

Audio sample
- 13-second audio sample of "Why Do Fools Fall in Love": file; help

"Why Do Fools Fall in Love" (initially "Why Do Birds Sing So Gay?") is a debut single by American rock and roll band Frankie Lymon & the Teenagers that was released on January 10, 1956. It reached No. 1 on the R&B chart, No. 6 on Billboard's Pop Singles chart, and No. 1 on the UK Singles Chart in July. Many renditions of the song by other artists have also been hit records in the U.S., including versions by the Diamonds (in 1956), the Beach Boys (in 1964), and Diana Ross (in 1981).

The song was included in Robert Christgau's "Basic Record Library" of 1950s and 1960s recordings—published in Christgau's Record Guide: Rock Albums of the Seventies (1981)—and ranked No. 314 on the Rolling Stone magazine's list of The 500 Greatest Songs of All Time. In 2001, the 1955 recording of the song on Gee Records was inducted into the Grammy Hall of Fame.

== Background and authorship ==
In late 1955, The Teenagers (at that time calling themselves The Premiers) auditioned a song called "Why do Birds Sing So Gay?" for George Goldner, recording producer and owner of Gee Records. Herman Santiago, tenor of the group, had written the song based on a line from some love letters given to the guys by a tenant in bassist Sherman Garnes' apartment building. One of them featured the words "Why do birds sing so gay?," which fit in with lyrics of other songs that Herman had been writing based on a 1-6-2-5 chord pattern. Herman adjusted the harmony to take advantage of Frankie Lymon's high tenor/soprano. At Goldner's suggestion, some of the lyrics were changed. During the audition, Lymon's voice stood out and Goldner recommended the lead in subsequent recording sessions be given to Lymon. The singer did some improvising and recreated the melody to match his own style. According to Jimmy Merchant, what happened at the recording session was a combination of "Frankie's singing ability coupled with George Goldner's special ability to bring out the best in Frankie."

Although early vinyl single releases of "Why Do Fools Fall in Love" credit Frankie Lymon, Herman Santiago, and George Goldner as co-writers of the song, later releases and cover versions were attributed only to Lymon and record producer George Goldner. Goldner's name was later replaced by Morris Levy when Levy bought Goldner's interest in Gee Records, the Teenagers' record company. After a lengthy court battle, songwriting credits were awarded to original Teenagers members Herman Santiago and Jimmy Merchant in December 1992.

However, this ruling was overturned by the U.S. Court of Appeals for the Second Circuit because Santiago and Merchant did not bring the case to court soon enough. This gave the song rights back to Lymon and Levy. The U.S. Supreme Court declined to hear a further appeal. The current publisher of the song is EMI Music Publishing, which still lists these two as the songwriters.

== Beach Boys version ==
"Why Do Fools Fall in Love"
- U.S. picture sleeve (reverse)

Single by the Beach Boys

from the album Shut Down Volume 2
- A-side: "Fun, Fun, Fun"
- Released: February 3, 1964
- Recorded: January 7–8, 1964
- Length: 2:07 (original version): 2:33 (extended version)
- Label: Capitol
- Songwriters: Frankie Lymon, Morris Levy
- Producer: Brian Wilson

The Beach Boys singles chronology
"Little Saint Nick" (1963)	"Why Do Fools Fall in Love" (1964)	"I Get Around" (1964)

The song was used as a B-side for the Beach Boys single "Fun, Fun, Fun", which reached #5 on the Billboard Hot 100 in 1964. The Beach Boys' version of the song charted at #120. It was included on the Beach Boys 1964 album Shut Down Volume 2 and had only appeared in mono since the release of the single back in 1964.

The single mix of the song was later found and used on the 2007 The Warmth of the Sun compilation and on The Original US Singles Collection The Capitol Years 1962–1965. This box set, released in 2008, also used a recently found mono single edit mix. In 2009, a new stereo mix was created with a newly discovered intro, due to the discovery of the original multitrack masters by Jon Stebbins and is featured on the band's compilation Summer Love Songs. The song was also performed as part of the band's 50th Anniversary Tour, usually during the first half of the shows. One of the performances was later included on the live album from the tour.

=== Personnel ===
Sourced from Craig Slowinski.

The Beach Boys

- Al Jardine – harmony and backing vocals
- Mike Love – intro bass vocal, harmony and backing vocals
- Brian Wilson – lead, harmony, and backing vocals, upright piano
- Carl Wilson – harmony and backing vocals
- Dennis Wilson – harmony and backing vocals

Additional musicians

- Leon Russell – upright piano, tack piano
- Al De Lory – grand piano
- Bill Pitman – acoustic guitar
- Tommy Tedesco – electric guitar
- Ray Pohlman – bass guitar
- Jimmy Bond – double bass
- Hal Blaine – drums, timpani
- Frank Capp – glockenspiel, temple blocks, castanets
- Steve Douglas – tenor saxophone
- Plas Johnson – tenor saxophone
- Jay Migliori – baritone saxophone

== Diana Ross version ==
"Why Do Fools Fall in Love"

Single by Diana Ross

from the album Why Do Fools Fall in Love
- B-side: "Think I'm in Love"
- Released: September 25, 1981
- Genre: R&B
- Length: 2:51
- Label: RCA Records
- Songwriter: Herman Santiago
- Producer: Diana Ross

Diana Ross singles chronology
"Endless Love" (1981)	"Why Do Fools Fall in Love" (1981)	"Mirror Mirror" (1981)

Music video
- "Why Do Fools Fall in Love" on YouTube

American singer Diana Ross released a cover version on the RCA label on September 25, 1981, as the first single from her album of the same name (1981). She also produced her rendition of the song. It peaked at No. 7 on the US Billboard Hot 100 chart, No. 2 on the Adult Contemporary chart, No. 6 on the Hot Soul Singles chart (now called Hot R&B/Hip-Hop Songs chart, and No. 4 on the UK Singles Chart. The song earned Ross a British Phonographic Industry silver disc award for sales in excess of 250,000 copies. It also reached No.1 in Belgium and the Netherlands and climbed to the top 10 in Ireland, New Zealand, and Switzerland as well as making the top 20 in Australia, Canada, and West Germany. A reissue of Ross' cover peaked at No. 36 on the UK chart in July 1994.

After the version by Ross was released, a controversy ensued concerning Lymon's estate. Three women that were involved in lawsuits and countersuits over Lymon's copyrights and royalties each claimed to be Lymon's rightful widow. The string of court cases were portrayed in the 1998 film Why Do Fools Fall in Love.

In the music video, Ross performs the song on Fremont Street in Las Vegas.

=== Track listings ===
- 7-inch single
1. "Why Do Fools Fall in Love" – 2:51
2. "Think I'm in Love"
- UK remix CD
1. "Why Do Fools Fall in Love" (159.0 bpm) – 2:53
2. "I'm Coming Out" (Joey Negro Extended 12", 109.7 bpm) – 6:05
3. "The Boss" (David Morales Club, taken from: Diana Extended/The Remixes, 124.0 bpm) – 6:29
4. "Love Hangover" (Joey Negro Hangover Symphony, 121.0 bpm) – 8:57
- UK reissue 7-inch
1. "Why Do Fools Fall in Love"
2. "I'm Coming Out" (Joey Negro 7-inch mix)

=== Charts ===
Weekly charts

Chart (1981–1982)	Peak position
Australia (Kent Music Report)	15
Belgium (Ultratop 50 Flanders)	1
Canada Adult Contemporary (RPM)	5
Canada Top Singles (RPM)	17
Finland (Suomen virallinen lista)	25
France (SNEP)	68
Ireland (IRMA)	9
Luxembourg (Radio Luxembourg)	5
Netherlands (Dutch Top 40)	1
Netherlands (Single Top 100)	1
New Zealand (Recorded Music NZ)	3
Switzerland (Schweizer Hitparade)	9
UK Singles (Official Charts)	4
US Billboard Hot 100	7
US Adult Contemporary (Billboard)	2
US Hot Soul Singles (Billboard)	6
US Cash Box Top 100	7
West Germany (GfK)	17

Year-end charts

Chart (1981)	Position
Netherlands (Dutch Top 40)	79
Netherlands (Single Top 100)	11
UK Singles (OCC)	72
US Cash Box Top 100	64

Chart (1982)	Position
Belgium (Ultratop 50 Flanders)	49
US Billboard Hot 100	54
US Adult Contemporary (Billboard)	46
US Hot Black Singles (Billboard)	43

Chart (1994)	Peak position
UK Singles (Official Charts)	36

=== Certifications ===
Certifications for "Why Do Fools Fall in Love"
Region	Certification	Certified units/sales
United Kingdom (BPI)	Silver	250,000^{^}
^{^} Shipments figures based on certification alone.

== Legacy ==
=== Film ===
The title of a 1998 biographical film depicting the original life of Frankie Lymon was named after the song.

=== Lawsuits ===
Disputes regarding the original recording's copyright and ownership of royalties emerged in the decades following Lymon's death, with cases lasting until the 1990s.

=== Soundtrack ===
The recording by Frankie Lymon & The Teenagers is featured in the 1973 film American Graffiti (which is set in 1962), in a scene where Richard Dreyfuss's character first notices a mysterious blonde girl; as well as the 1999 film October Sky, it is featured when Jake Gyllenhaal's character Homer Hickam and his friends are spending the night out at the dance club.

== Other charting versions ==
- The Canadian group the Diamonds did a more traditional doo wop version that came out two months after Lymon's in March 1956. This version stayed 19 weeks on the Billboard chart, topping out at No. 12.
- Gale Storm released a version of the song as a single in 1956 that reached #9 on the Billboard pop chart.
- Gloria Mann released a version of the song as a single in 1956 that reached #59 on the Billboard pop chart.
- Alma Cogan released a version of the song as a single in 1956 that reached #25 in the UK.
- The Happenings released a slower version of the song, in a harmony-driven soft rock arrangement, as a single in 1967 that reached #41 on the Billboard Hot 100.
- Ponderosa Twins Plus One released a version of the song as a single in 1972 that reached #40 on the US R&B chart and #102 on the Billboard pop chart.
- Joni Mitchell, backed by The Persuasions, released a live version of the song as a single in 1980 that reached #102 on the Bubbling Under Hot 100.

== See also ==
- List of UK Singles Chart number ones of the 1950s
