= I Promise to Remember =

1956 single by Frankie Lymon and The Teenagers

Single by Frankie Lymon and The Teenagers

from the album The Teenagers Featuring Frankie Lymon
- B-side: "Who Can Explain?"
- Released: June 1956
- Genre: Rhythm and blues; doo-wop
- Length: 2:42
- Label: Gee
- Songwriter(s): Jimmy Castor, Jimmy Smith

Frankie Lymon and The Teenagers singles chronology
"I Want You to Be My Girl" (1956)	"I Promise to Remember" (1956)	"The ABC's of Love" (1956)

"I Promise to Remember" is a song written by Jimmy Castor and Jimmy Smith and performed by Frankie Lymon and The Teenagers featuring Jimmy Wright and His Orchestra. It reached #10 on the US R&B chart and #57 on the Billboard pop chart in 1956. The song was featured on their 1956 album, The Teenagers Featuring Frankie Lymon.

The single's B-side, "Who Can Explain?", reached #7 on the US R&B chart.

== Other versions ==
- The Jimmy Castor Bunch released a version of the song as the B-side to their 1972 single "Troglodyte (Cave Man)". It was featured on their album, It's Just Begun.
