= Sherman Garnes =

American singer (1940–1977)

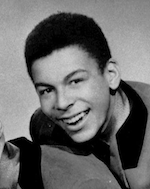
- Garnes in 1956

Background information
- Born: Sherman Marlow Garnes; June 8, 1940; New York City, New York, United States
- Died: February 26, 1977 (aged 36) New York City, United States
- Genres: Rock and roll
- Occupation: Singer
- Years active: 1954–1977
- Label: Gee Records
- Formerly of: Frankie Lymon and the Teenagers

Sherman Marlow Garnes (June 8, 1940 – February 26, 1977) was an American singer and member of the doo-wop group The Teenagers. He is remembered for his distinctive bass register.

== Early life ==
Garnes attended Edward W. Stitt Junior High School, where he met Jimmy Merchant. They formed a group called The Earth Angels before forming the Coupe de Villes along with Herman Santiago and Joe Negroni in 1954. This group, with the addition of Frankie Lymon, later became The Teenagers and had a hit song with "Why Do Fools Fall in Love".

== Solo Attempt ==
Garnes recorded three songs at Mediasound in New York City in the mid 1970s. They were Cos I'm A Poor Loser, Our Love Is Gone Girl, Let Go and Long Lasting Romance (He's No Lover). Helmed by well-known disco producer Tom Moulton, nothing came of them.

== Personal life ==
On February 26, 1977, Garnes died of a heart attack in his home in Brooklyn, New York after complications from open heart surgery; he was only 36 years old. Garnes was posthumously inducted into the Rock and Roll Hall of Fame in 1993 as a member of the Teenagers.

Garnes was 6 feet 6 inches (1.98 m) tall and had a size 13 shoe. He had a daughter named Leslie Garnes Carlisle (Moguel).
