= Gone Records =

- Founded: 1957
- Founder: George Goldner

Gone Records was a record label founded in 1957 by George Goldner, along with music publishing arm Real Gone Music, that was active in the late 1950s and early 1960s. Among the artists that recorded for the label were Bill Haley & His Comets, Ral Donner, Jo-Ann Campbell, Eddie Platt, Johnny Rivers, and The Four Seasons. It was acquired by Morris Levy and incorporated into Roulette Records in 1962.

== See also ==
- List of record labels
