= The ABC's of Love =

1956 single by Frankie Lymon and The Teenagers

Single by Frankie Lymon and The Teenagers

from the album The Teenagers Featuring Frankie Lymon
- B-side: "Share"
- Released: September 1956
- Genre: Rock and roll
- Length: 2:29
- Label: Gee
- Songwriter(s): George Goldner, Richard Barrett

Frankie Lymon and The Teenagers singles chronology
"I Promise to Remember" (1956)	"The ABC's of Love" (1956)	"I'm Not a Juvenile Delinquent" (1956)

"The ABC's of Love" is a song written by George Goldner and Richard Barrett and performed by Frankie Lymon and The Teenagers featuring Jimmy Wright and His Orchestra. It reached #8 on the US R&B chart and #77 on the Billboard pop chart in 1956. The song was featured on their 1956 album, The Teenagers Featuring Frankie Lymon.

== Other versions ==
- The Persuasions released a version of the song as the B-side to their single "The Sun".
