= Jimmy Merchant =

American singer and musician (born 1940)

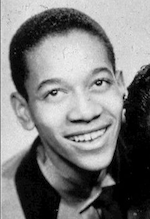
- Merchant in 1956

Background information
- Born: James Edward Merchant; February 10, 1940 (age 86); Morrisania, Bronx, New York
- Genres: Doo-wop, rock and roll
- Occupations: Musician, singer
- Years active: 1954–present
- Label: Gee
- Formerly of: The Teenagers

James Edward Merchant (born February 10, 1940) is an American singer and musician. He was a member of the doo-wop group The Teenagers. Merchant was inducted into the Rock and Roll Hall of Fame in 1993 as a member of the Teenagers. He retired from The Teenagers in 2005.

== Early life and career ==
Merchant was born on February 10, 1940, in Morrisania, Bronx, New York, due to Harlem Hospital not having enough room at that time.

In September 1954, while attending Edward W. Stitt Junior High School, Merchant met Sherman Garnes and formed The Earth Angels. They then formed The Coupe De Villes and Herman Santiago and Joe Negroni joined the group. Frankie Lymon watched the show before joining the group, and they evolved to The Ermines and The Premiers before renaming themselves The Teenagers. The song "Why Do Fools Fall in Love" was released in 1955. In 1956, Lymon left the group while Billy Lobrano join the band in 1957. After they have success with Lobrano, he left in 1958. Sherman Garnes died in 1977, and Joe Negroni died in 1978. Lewis Lymon (formerly of Lewis Lymon & The Teenchords), Pearl McKinnon (formerly of The Kodaks), Bobby Jay, and Eric Ward later joined the group. Jimmy Castor joined as the lead singer before he left and was replaced by Timothy Wilson (formerly of Tiny Tim & the Hits). Thomas Lockhart joined the group as well. Merchant retired in 2005, but teamed up again with Herman Santiago in 2008. They were known as Frankie Lymon's Teenagers or The Legendary Teenagers.

In 1997, Merchant joined The Royal All Stars (Doo Wop All Stars). He took the place of BJ Jones from the Dubs, and along with Vito Balsamo from Vito and the Salutations, Artie Loria from The Earls, Randy Silverman from The Impalas, and Eugene Pitt from The Jive Five, they became a mainstay in the "doo wop" circuit and toured relentlessly in the following years. Merchant arranged a lot of the vocal harmonies for the group. The group performed and toured all over the country bringing the show to countless numbers of doo wop / oldies fans. Merchant remained in the Doo Wop All Stars for two years, until he returned to The Teenagers.

On May 26, 2023, Merchant released his memoir called A Teenager's Dream: Why Do Fools Fall in Love via Pearly Gates Publishing.
