= End Records =

American record label

- Founded: 1957
- Country of origin: United States

End Records was a record label founded in 1957 by George Goldner. In 1962 the label was acquired by Morris Levy and incorporated into Roulette Records. Among its more successful recording acts were the Flamingos, the Chantels, and Little Anthony and the Imperials; it also recorded singles by Marilyn Monroe and Wilt Chamberlain. In 1988 Roulette was purchased by Rhino Records, and Rhino in turn was sold in the 1990s to what is now the Warner Music Group, which currently owns the End Records archives.

== See also ==
- List of record labels
