= George Goldner =

American music executive (1918–1970)

Background information
- Born: February 9, 1918; Brooklyn, New York, United States
- Died: April 15, 1970 (aged 52) Turtle Bay, New York, United States
- Occupations: Record label owner, record producer
- Years active: 1948–1970

George Goldner (February 9, 1918 – April 15, 1970) was an American record label owner, record producer and promoter who played an important role in establishing the popularity of rock and roll in the 1950s, by recording and promoting many groups and records that appealed to young people across racial boundaries. Among the acts he discovered were the Crows, Frankie Lymon and the Teenagers, and Little Anthony and the Imperials.

He established (or helped establish) a number of record labels, including Tico, Rama, Gee, Roulette, End, Gone, and Red Bird. It was said of him that he "discovered more talent, both in front of the microphone and behind the scenes, than most producers get to record in a lifetime. Moreover, in the decades since, much of the music that Goldner recorded and released has retained an astonishing appeal to generations of listeners".

== Early life ==
Goldner was born to a Jewish family in 1918 to a mother Rose originally from Poland and father Adolph from Austria. He and his two sisters grew up in the Turtle Bay neighborhood of the east side of New York City, and he attended Stuyvesant High School. While still in school he worked weekends as a waiter at the Shelton Hotel, where his father also worked while acquiring furnished brownstones. Goldner later worked in the garment business, before opening a chain of dance halls in New York and New Jersey.

== Latin music and Tico Records ==
Goldner's dance clubs thrived in the late 1940s during the craze for Latin music, a style that Goldner loved. In 1948, he established his first record label, Tico Records, named after the song "Tico-Tico". The company recorded and distributed music by such artists as Tito Puente, Joe Loco and Machito, becoming the most important Latin music label and helping to integrate the music into mainstream pop, especially through mambo music.

== R&B and rock 'n' roll ==
Finding that increasing numbers of African-American patrons were visiting his clubs, Goldner decided in 1953 to start a new label, Rama, to record jazz, vocal group and R&B music. One of his earliest records on the label was "Gee" by The Crows. The record soon rose to the top of the R&B chart, but - to the surprise of Goldner and others - was also bought by white teenagers, who were increasingly listening to hitherto "black" radio stations, and rose to No. 14 on the pop chart as well. This crossover success, as "the first R&B single to get a significant part of its sales and chart success from purchases by white teenagers", has led to some describing it as "the first rock and roll record".

Because radio stations would play only a few records from each label, Goldner also set up Gee Records, and found some success immediately with the Cleftones. He also recruited Richard Barrett, lead singer of another doo-wop group, the Valentines, as his production assistant. They mostly worked at the Bell recording studios in Manhattan. Although Goldner could not read music, he had an ear for rock and roll, and acted as the producer of most recordings on his labels. Jerry Leiber said that he had the taste of a fourteen-year-old girl, and that, as far as sales and promotion went, Goldner was a master. In promoting his records, he sometimes gave gratuities or paid DJs at radio stations, to give consideration to his companies' records. This practice, which came to be known as payola, was widespread.

According to one source:

"In the studio, Goldner and his right-hand man Richard Barrett... had multi-faceted jobs: find the right key and "groove" for a song; collaborate with the musicians to create a "head" arrangement; encourage and control the young, often inexperienced singers during their maiden visits to the recording studio; oversee the vocal balance by placing the singers at the proper distance from the microphone; keep an eagle eye on the clock (sessions were traditionally three hours in length, after which overtime kicked in); and, most importantly, recognize the magical "best take" that would ultimately click with the record-buying teenagers."

Goldner signed and recorded Frankie Lymon and the Teenagers, whose song "Why Do Fools Fall in Love" also became a crossover hit in early 1956, this time also becoming an international success. By then, Goldner - who was an inveterate gambler and frequently needed to pay off his debts - had sold half of his share of the Tico, Rama and Gee labels to Joe Kolsky, an associate of club owner and juke box distributor Morris Levy, who reportedly had links to the Mafia. Goldner also started the Luniverse label with Bill Buchanan and Dickie Goodman, to release novelty records. In 1956 its first release, "The Flying Saucer", pioneered the idea of "break-in" or "mashup" records, featuring segments of popular songs intertwined with spoken "news" commentary, and sold over a million copies.

In January 1957, Goldner, Kolsky and Levy formed Roulette Records, but shortly afterwards Goldner sold his interest in the company, as well as his remaining interests in Tico, Rama, and Gee, to Levy. In their place, he started two more new labels, End and Gone, both distributed by Morris Levy's Roulette organization. Both labels provided hits for doo-wop groups. The End label saw success with "He's Gone" and "Maybe" by the Chantels; "Tears on My Pillow" by Little Anthony and the Imperials; and, in 1959, "I Only Have Eyes For You" by the Flamingos. The first release on Gone, "Don't Ask Me To Be Lonely" by the Dubs, was also a hit, and the label had further hits with Ral Donner. Goldner also recorded the Isley Brothers, the Four Seasons and Johnny Rivers on Gone.

In 1958, Goldner hired a young Artie Ripp, (who went on establish his own record labels and was the first to sign and produce Billy Joel as a solo act), as his "gofer". Goldner taught Ripp his practices regarding how to create and distribute music, including how to structure a record contract, how to work a studio, and how to get a record on the radio.

By the early 1960s, Goldner had sold his End and Gone labels to Levy, and worked for a time as a record producer at Roulette.

== Goldisc Records ==
In 1960, Goldner founded the Goldisc Records in New York City. The label featured a number of notable artists, including Ivory Joe Hunter, Little Richard, and a vocal group called The Temptations.

After some success in the early 1960s, the label faced financial difficulties in 1964 and became dormant in the following years. Its assets were acquired by Timeless Entertainment in 1978. Under new ownership, Goldisc reissued hundreds of 1950s and 1960s vinyl discs.

== Red Bird Records and later life ==
Goldner's last successful label, Red Bird Records (which had a subsidiary, Blue Cat Records) was actually co-founded by Jerry Leiber and Mike Stoller. Goldner became a partner in the company, promoting Red Bird releases, while Leiber and Stoller worked on production. The company was successful, producing hits for the Dixie Cups, the Shangri-Las, and the Ad-Libs. However, the label lasted just two years, as Leiber and Stoller wanted out of the record business, either due to creative differences, or once Goldner's gambling debts again led to Morris Levy's involvement. After an abortive attempt to merge it with Atlantic Records, Leiber and Stoller sold their interest in Red Bird Records to Goldner in 1966 for $1, by which time Goldner's uncontrolled gambling habit had placed the label under the control of the Mafia.

Goldner's final venture was to form the short-lived Firebird label in early 1970.

== Death ==
Goldner died of a heart attack on April 15, 1970, at age 52.

== Legacy ==
A musical based on the life of Goldner and featuring music from his record labels premiered in Hollywood in 2012 titled The Boy from New York City.
