= Gee Records =

American record label

Gee Records was a New York–based American record label formed as a subsidiary to Gloria Gee George Goldner's Tico Records and Rama Records labels in 1953 to honor the million selling hit song "Gee" (1953). Sometime in 1955 Goldner (an inveterate gambler) sold 50% of Gee to Joe Kolsky who was a business partner of Morris Levy. The label is famously known for Frankie Lymon and the Teenagers, including their debut "Why Do Fools Fall in Love" in 1956. Kolsky and Goldner then opened another label Roulette Records in 1957 with Levy as president. A few months later, Goldner sold his shares of Roulette, Rama, Gee, and Tico to the Morris Levy Combine. Goldner then proceeded that year to open two new companies Gone Records and End Records. Gee Records eventually became deactivated. When Gee Records was reactivated as a division of Roulette Records by president Morris Levy in early April 1961, The Cleftones' hit "Heart and Soul" (1961) became Gee Records first release.

== Gee Records artists ==
- The Crows
- The Cleftones
- Frankie Lymon & the Teenagers
- The Regents
- The Rosebuds
- Bill "Bass" Gordon and His Colonials

== See also ==
- List of record labels
