= Lovelace (film) =

2013 film by Rob Epstein and Jeffrey Friedman

- Theatrical release poster
- Directed by: Rob Epstein; Jeffrey Friedman
- Written by: Andy Bellin
- Produced by: Jason Weinberg; Jim Young; Heidi Jo Markel; Laura Rister
- Starring: Amanda Seyfried; Peter Sarsgaard; Sharon Stone; Robert Patrick; Juno Temple; Chris Noth; Bobby Cannavale; Hank Azaria; Adam Brody; Chloë Sevigny; James Franco; Debi Mazar; Wes Bentley; Eric Roberts
- Cinematography: Eric Edwards
- Edited by: Robert Dalva; Matthew Landon
- Music by: Stephen Trask
- Production companies: Eclectic Pictures; Millennium Films; Untitled Entertainment; Animus Films; Telling Pictures
- Distributed by: Radius-TWC; Alchemy
- Release dates: January 22, 2013 (Sundance); August 9, 2013 (United States)
- Running time: 93 minutes
- Country: United States
- Language: English
- Budget: $7 million
- Box office: $1.6 million

Lovelace is a 2013 American biographical drama film directed by Rob Epstein and Jeffrey Friedman and written by Andy Bellin. Starring Amanda Seyfried, Peter Sarsgaard, Sharon Stone, Robert Patrick, Juno Temple, Chris Noth, Bobby Cannavale, Hank Azaria, Adam Brody, Chloë Sevigny, James Franco, Debi Mazar, Wes Bentley, and Eric Roberts, the film follows the life of Linda Lovelace (Seyfried), a pornographic actress who suffers years of abuse at the hands of her husband, Chuck Traynor (Sarsgaard), as she emerges at the forefront of the Golden Age of Porn following her starring role in the landmark adult film Deep Throat (1972).

Lovelace premiered at the Sundance Film Festival on January 22, 2013, and was theatrically released in the United States on August 9, 2013. The film received mixed reviews from critics, with criticism aimed at its historical inaccuracies, while the performances of Seyfried and Sarsgaard were praised. It was a box office flop, grossing $1.6 million against its $7 million production budget.

== Plot ==
In 1970, 21-year-old Linda Susan Boreman is living with her parents in Davie, Florida, having moved from New York City. While out dancing one night with her best friend Patsy, Linda attracts the attention of a man named Chuck Traynor and the two soon develop a relationship after a vulnerable Linda reveals to him that she has a strained relationship with her parents. The strain was caused because Linda had earlier given birth to a son out-of-wedlock and her domineering mother Dorothy had tricked her into putting the baby up for adoption.

Chuck, much older than Linda, begins teaching her how to perform sexual acts, which she is initially thrilled about. After breaking curfew one night, Linda is berated by Dorothy, forcing Linda to move out so she can live with Chuck, later marrying him. During a party, Linda watches one of Chuck's homemade pornographic films for the first time and tells him that "good girls don't do that stuff".

Six months later, Linda bails Chuck out of jail for facilitating prostitution, although he claims to have had little knowledge of what went on in the parking lot behind his bar. Desperate for money, he persuades Linda to become a pornographic actress. By 1972, Linda begins working on a film, Deep Throat, in which she uses her new stage name "Linda Lovelace".

The film becomes a huge success, making over $30,000 at the box office in its first week. After it becomes a worldwide phenomenon, Linda is interviewed by a variety of print and radio reporters and becomes the subject of late-night television humor. Her life is seen as exciting and glamorous, and Linda poses nude, and attends parties, weekly.

During a private screening in Los Angeles, Playboy founder Hugh Hefner convinces Linda that she has the potential to be more than a pornographic actress. However, Chuck's violent and cruel nature is gradually exposed and Linda's life is revealed not to be as perfect as it seems. Chuck seemingly chokes Linda during sex, refusing to stop when she asks, and later forces her into prostitution at gunpoint.

A battered Linda soon visits her parents seeking to move back in. Despite telling them of Chuck's dominating abuse towards her, Dorothy encourages Linda to endure her ordeal as their religion forbids divorce. When learning that Linda has been discussing a new salary with the film's director, Gerard Damiano, without telling him, an enraged Chuck punishes her by making Linda shower in freezing cold water.

Years after Deep Throat's success, Chuck tries to persuade Linda to do another pornographic film. When Linda refuses, a now sadistic Chuck takes her to a "party" where Linda is gang raped. Her attempts to escape result in Chuck sleeping on top of Linda, almost suffocating her.

The following day, Linda secretly meets with Anthony Romano, telling him she wants out of the pornography industry and also revealing the abuse inflicted on her by Chuck. Disgusted, Romano has her checked into a private hotel while he and his bodyguards attack Chuck for abusing Linda and for the $25,000 he owes.

Six years later, Linda marries Larry Marchiano, moves to Long Island and has a young son. Linda later takes a polygraph test before publishing her autobiography Ordeal, which details years of Chuck's physical and sexual abuse, as well as his stealing all of her earnings. Linda appears on Donahue, and her distraught parents break down in tears while watching her. A few days later, the Marchianos travel to Florida for Linda to reconcile with her parents.

== Cast ==
- Amanda Seyfried as Linda Lovelace
- Peter Sarsgaard as Chuck Traynor
- Sharon Stone as Dorothy Boreman
- Robert Patrick as John Boreman
- Juno Temple as Patsy
- Chris Noth as Anthony Romano
- Bobby Cannavale as Louis "Butchie" Peraino
- Hank Azaria as Gerry Damiano
- Adam Brody as Harry Reems
- Chloë Sevigny as feminist journalist
- James Franco as Hugh Hefner
- Debi Mazar as Dolly Sharp
- Wes Bentley as Thomas, the photographer
- Eric Roberts as Nat Laurendi
- Cory Hardrict as Frankie Crocker
- Sofia Karstens as piano singer
- LisaGay Hamilton as Marsha
- Don McManus as Arty Shapiro
- Lou Richards as Senator Specter
- Sandy Martin as ticket lady
- David Gueriera as Larry Marchiano (uncredited)

== Production ==
=== Casting ===
In January 2011, pregnant Kate Hudson was offered the part of Linda Lovelace while James Franco was in talks to portray Lovelace's husband Chuck Traynor. The production of the film was planned to begin after the birth of Hudson's child and as of April 2011, the actress was still involved in the project. However, on November 1, 2011, Amanda Seyfried and Peter Sarsgaard were reported to be in discussions to play Lovelace and Traynor. Sharon Stone announced on November 16, 2011, that she would play Lovelace's mother. In December 2011, Juno Temple and Wes Bentley were cast as Lovelace's best friend and Larry Marchiano, her second husband.

In December 2011, Franco received the part of Hugh Hefner. Robert Patrick, Hank Azaria, Chris Noth, and Bobby Cannavale landed the respective roles of John Boreman (Lovelace's father), Gerry Damiano, Anthony Romano and Butchie Peraino. On January 2, 2012, Adam Brody and Eric Roberts were cast as Harry Reems and Nat Laurendi, while Demi Moore agreed to a cameo appearance as Gloria Steinem. A few weeks later she dropped out of the film for personal issues and was replaced by Sarah Jessica Parker. However, Parker's cameo was ultimately deleted. Cory Hardrict and Debi Mazar play Frankie Crocker and Dolly Sharp. Chloë Sevigny plays a feminist journalist.

To prepare for the role, Seyfried read Lovelace's books and studied videos of her speaking. She also watched the film Deep Throat and underwent a New York accent training. Seyfried said of Lovelace: "She was such a different person than what we expect. It's a good story to tell, and I'm really, really excited about it." Brody prepared for the role of Reems by watching his interviews. He told that "the arrest and indictment of Reems on federal charges of conspiracy to distribute obscenity across state lines" are not shown in the film. He described as "brotherly" the relationship Reems shares with Deep Throat co-star Lovelace, explaining that "he was the antithesis of her husband [Traynor]".

=== Filming ===
We were doing a scene where I was supposed to be going down on Peter Sarsgaard. We used a popsicle, and I had my arms covering the popsicle. It was footage that he was going to show the Deep Throat guy, to get her into the movie, to get her cast. I was laughing hysterically throughout. I couldn't stop laughing.

— Seyfried on shooting a sex scene

The Hollywood Reporter reported on January 13, 2012 that filming had already begun in Los Angeles. A few days later, photographs of Amanda Seyfried as Linda Lovelace on a film set were published. Scenes were shot in Glendale, California. Filming wrapped in February 2012.

Epstein used "grainy" 16 mm film as a reference to the 70s films depicted in the plot. During the filming, the cooperation between Seyfried and Sarsgaard went so well that she called him with hindsight "the best actor I've ever worked with".

=== Post-production ===
Sarah Jessica Parker's scenes did not make it into the final version due to the time setting for the end of the film being changed from 1984 to 1980. As a result, the role of Gloria Steinem became unnecessary.

== Release ==
Lovelace premiered at the Sundance Film Festival on January 22, 2013. The film was released in the United States on August 9, 2013.

== Reception ==
Lovelace was met with mixed reviews. On the review aggregator website Rotten Tomatoes, the film holds an approval rating of 54% based on 127 reviews, with an average rating of 5.7/10. The website's critics consensus reads, "Amanda Seyfried and Peter Sarsgaard do their best with the material, but Lovelace lacks enough depth and conviction to truly do its fascinating subject justice." Metacritic, which uses a weighted average, assigned the film a score of 51 out of 100, based on 37 critics, indicating "mixed or average" reviews.

Todd McCarthy of The Hollywood Reporter wrote the film was "smartly done". Richard Roeper gave the film a B+, commenting that it "never really feels triumphant or inspirational. It's very well-made and well-acted, but it's a reminder that the most famous porn star of the most famous porn movie ever made was a victim through and through." On the other hand, Variety's Rob Nelson complained the true story behind the film had been simplified to a "series of cartoonish vignettes". Amanda Mae Meyncke endorsed Seyfried's portrayal as "excellent" but considered the film all in all only "mediocre".

=== Historical accuracy ===
Doubts were also raised as to the historical accuracy of the film's narrative. In particular, Gerard Damiano Jr., son of the director of Deep Throat, and Eric Danville, Linda Lovelace's biographer, spoke to The Rialto Report about how the film conflated spousal abuse with the treatment of actors in the adult film industry.

== Music ==
The soundtrack to Lovelace was released on September 9, 2013.

No.	Title	Artist	Length
1.	"I've Got to Use My Imagination"	Gladys Knight & the Pips	3:30
2.	"Gimme Little Sign"	Brenton Wood	2:20
3.	"Fooled Around and Fell in Love"	Elvin Bishop	4:36
4.	"Funky Funky Way of Makin' Love"	John Ellison & The Soul Brothers Six	3:25
5.	"If You Ain't Gettin' Your Thing"	L.J. Waiters & the Electrifiers	3:21
6.	"Shotgun Shuffle"	KC & the Sunshine Band	2:45
7.	"Oh How I Love It"	People's Choice	3:05
8.	"Keep On Truckin'"	Eddie Kendricks	8:00
9.	"Let It Ride"	Bachman–Turner Overdrive	3:30
10.	"Rock Your Baby"	George McCrae	6:25
11.	"'Tain't Nobody's Business if I Do"	Sofia Karstens	3:42
12.	"You Made Me Beautiful"	Stephen Trask	2:09
13.	"Spirit in the Sky"	Norman Greenbaum	4:01
Total length:			50:49

== See also ==
- Inside Deep Throat
