= Bryanston Distributing Company =

Defunct American film company

- Logo of the company doing business as Bryanston Pictures
- Formerly: Bryanston Pictures
- Type: Private
- Industry: Film
- Founded: 1972; 54 years ago
- Founders: Louis Peraino; Philip Parisi
- Defunct: 1976; 50 years ago
- Fate: Bankruptcy
- Headquarters: United States
- Key people: Louis Peraino
- Products: Motion pictures
- Services: Film distribution

Bryanston Distributing Company (formerly known as Bryanston Distributors and also traded as Bryanston Pictures) was an American film distribution company that was active during the 1970s. The company was founded by Louis Peraino and Philip Parisi in 1972. It went bankrupt in 1976, amid the company's numerous legal troubles.

== History ==
The company's first title was Deep Throat (1972), a pornographic film which had a $22,000 budget that generated $30–50 million in box office revenues.

Among the company's other notable releases were The Party at Kitty and Stud's (1970), Flesh for Frankenstein (1973), Dark Star (1974), Return of the Dragon (1974), The Texas Chain Saw Massacre (1974), Coonskin (1975), The Devil's Rain (1975) and That's the Way of the World (1976).

In the early 1970s, two sons of Colombo crime family member Anthony Peraino – Louis Peraino and brother Joseph Peraino Sr. – were president and vice‐president/secretary‐treasurer of Bryanston, respectively.

On August 28, 1974, Louis Peraino agreed to distribute The Texas Chain Saw Massacre worldwide, from which production manager Ron Bozman and Texas Film Commissioner Warren Skaaren would receive $225,000 (about $1,500,000 inflation-adjusted) and 35% of the profits. Years later Bozman stated, "We made a deal with the devil, [sigh], and I guess that, in a way, we got what we deserved." They signed the contract with Bryanston and, after the investors recouped their money (with interest),—and after Skaaren, the lawyers, and the accountants were paid—only $8,100 (about $52,900 inflation-adjusted) was left to be divided among the 20 cast and crew members. Eventually the producers sued Bryanston for failing to pay them their full percentage of the box office profits. A court judgment instructed Bryanston to pay the filmmakers $500,000 (about $3,300,000 inflation-adjusted), but by then the company had declared bankruptcy. In 1983, New Line Cinema acquired the distribution rights from Bryanston and gave the producers a larger share of the profits.

In 1976, there was a series of federal cases in Memphis, Tennessee, where over 60 individuals and companies, including the Perainos and actor Harry Reems, were indicted for conspiracy to distribute obscenity across state lines for Deep Throat. Director Gerard Damiano and actress Linda Lovelace were granted immunity in exchange for testimony. Federal District Court judge Harry W. Wellford heard the case with the trial ending with a conviction. This was the first time that an actor had been prosecuted by the federal government on obscenity charges (Lenny Bruce had been prosecuted in the 1960s by local authorities). On appeal, Reems was represented by Alan Dershowitz, and his conviction was overturned: the Miller test (the three-pronged standard from the U.S. Supreme Court's 1973 decision in Miller v. California that determines what constitutes obscenity) had been applied in his case. The Federal Bureau of Investigation case known as "Miporn" convicted and sentenced, on April 30, 1977, Michael Cherubino to five months' imprisonment and fined $4,000, Anthony Novello to six months' imprisonment, Joseph Peraino Sr. to one year's imprisonment and fined $10,000 (including a $10,000 fine to his company, Plymouth Distributors Inc.), Louis Peraino to one year's imprisonment and fined $10,000 (including a $10,000 fine to each of his two companies, Bryanston Distributors Inc. and Gerard Damiano Productions Inc.), Anthony Battista to four months' imprisonment and fined $4,000, Carl Carter to six months' imprisonment and fined $6,500, Mel Friedman to nine months' imprisonment and fined $7,500, and Mario Desalvo to three months' imprisonment and fined $3,500.

In January 1982, Joseph Peraino Sr., who was convicted in Miami on December 6, 1981, of six counts of interstate shipments of obscene matter, was the target of a shooting that left him injured, and his son Joseph Peraino Jr., dead.
