= Lovelace: A Rock Musical =

- Music: Anna Waronker & Charlotte Caffey
- Lyrics: Anna Waronker & Charlotte Caffey, Jeffery Leonard Bowman
- Book: Anna Waronker & Charlotte Caffey
- Productions: 2008-2009 Los Angeles; 2010 Edinburgh

Lovelace: A Rock Musical is a rock musical about the life of adult film star and women's liberation advocate, Linda Lovelace. The book, music, and lyrics are by Anna Waronker (that dog.) and Charlotte Caffey (The Go-Go's), with original concept and lyrics by Jeffery Leonard Bowman. The show debuted with a six-month run at the Hayworth Theatre (Los Angeles) in 2008. A new production of Lovelace: A Rock Musical made its United Kingdom debut at The Edinburgh Festival Fringe in August 2010.

== Musical numbers ==
Act I

- Overture
- Spring of '69
- Good Morning
- From This Moment On
- Traynor's Place
- For Better Or Worse
- Dashiki Interlude
- Wedding Song
- You Love Me
- Save It For Your Prayers
- Back to Business
- Hide My Soul
- Mrs. Boreman
- Mama
- Til Death Do Us Part
- I'll Be Good, I'll Be Bad
- Mary Had A Little Lamb
- Who Could Ask For Anything More?
- Gerard's Trilogy
- Let's Fuck
- Glamour & Glitz
- Back To Business

Act II

- Girl Next Door
- Room Service
- In Too Deep
- Overnight Sensation
- Best Love
- Well Well Well
- Best Love (Reprise)
- Lovelace Interlude
- So Far, So Fast
- Traynor's Place (Reprise)
- Who Do You Think You Are?
- From this Moment On (Reprise)
- I've Done Things I Would Never Do

Act III

- Leaving The Limelight
- Good Morning (Reprise)
- Can You Feel My Love?
- Take Back The Night
- Ordeal
- I Stand Before You
- Eulogy
- Out Of Bondage

== Roles and cast ==
=== Edinburgh Cast ===
- Linda Lovelace - Katrina Lenk
- Chuck Traynor - Jimmy Swan
- Harry Reems - Joshua J. Greene
- Mrs. Boreman - Jill Burke
- Gerard Damiano - Alan Palmer
- Lindsay Marchiano - Elise Vannerson
- Doctor - Curt Bonnem
- Young Girl - Rachael Cavenaugh
- Waiter, Larry Marchiano - Joe Donohoe
- Feminist - Kasi Jones

=== Los Angeles Cast ===
- Linda Lovelace - Katrina Lenk
- Chuck Traynor - Jimmy Swan
- Harry Reems - Joshua J. Greene
- Mrs. Boreman - Whitney Allen
- Gerard Damiano - Alan Palmer
- Lindsay Marchiano - Sonya Bender
- Doctor - Curt Bonnem
- Young Girl - Kelly Devoto
- Waiter, Larry Marchiano - Milan Cronovich
- Feminist - Jill Burke
- Stripper - Rachael Cavenaugh
- Understudy - Joe Donohoe
- Understudy - Kendra Smith
- Understudy - Josh Adamson

== Critical reception ==
Reception for Lovelace: A Rock Musical has been largely positive. The Los Angeles Times chose the rock musical as a "Critics' Choice," and described it as a "candidate for the most original musical since Spring Awakening." Times critic David C. Nichols praised Anna Waronker and Charlotte Caffey's "accomplished score", called Ken Sawyer's direction "brilliant," and lauded Katrina Lenk's "vast emotional range" in the role of Linda Lovelace. The LA Weekly called Waronker and Caffey's musical "dark and haunting" and described Lenk's lead performance as "sensational." Backstage (West) praised the performances of Lenk, Jimmy Swan (Chuck Traynor), and Joshua J. Greene (Harry Reems), but called the musical's story "simplistic." Frontiers (magazine) gave the musical a rating of three and a half stars.

== Awards ==
Ovation Awards

- Nomination/Best Lead Actress in a Musical (Katrina Lenk)

Back Stage Garland Awards

- Win/Best Performance in a Musical Production (Katrina Lenk)
- Win/Best Musical Score (Anna Waronker & Charlotte Caffey)
- Nomination/Best Music Direction - Anna Waronker & Charlotte Caffey - Nomination
- Nomination/Best Direction (Ken Sawyer)
- Nomination/Best Performance in a (Primarily) Musical Production (Joshua J. Greene)
- Nomination/Best Performance in a (Primarily) Musical Production (Jimmy Swan)

Los Angeles Drama Critics Circle Award

- Nomination/Best Musical Score (Anna Waronker & Charlotte Caffey)
- Nomination/Best Direction of a Musical (Ken Sawyer)
- Nomination/Best Lead Performance in a Musical (Katrina Lenk)
- Nomination/Best Featured Performance in a Musical (Jimmy Swan)

LA Weekly Theatre Awards

- Win/Best Director of a Musical (Ken Sawyer)
- Win/Best Performance in a Musical (Katrina Lenk)
- Win/Best Ensemble Cast in a Musical (Company)
- Nomination/Musical of the Year

Stage Scene LA Awards

- Win/Outstanding Achievement by a Director (Musical) (Ken Sawyer)
- Win/Outstanding Achievement by a Lead Actor (Musical) (Jimmy Swan)
- Win/Outstanding Achievement by a lead Actress (Musical) (Katrina Lenk)
- Win/Best World Premier Musical (Anna Waronker & Charlotte Caffey)
