= Katrina Lenk =

American actress

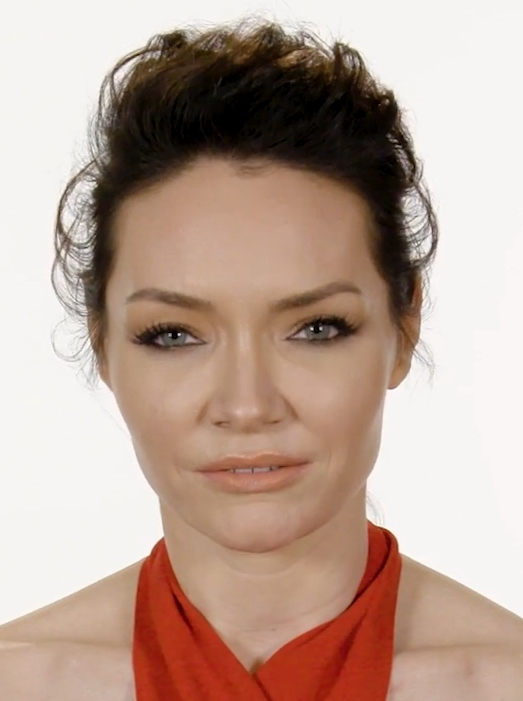
- Lenk in 2018
- Born: November 26, 1974 (age 51); Chicago, Illinois, U.S.
- Education: Northwestern University
- Occupations: Actress; singer; dancer
- Years active: 2000–present

Katrina Lenk (born November 26, 1974) is an American actress, singer, dancer, musician, and songwriter. She is best known for originating the role of Dina in the 2017 Broadway musical The Band's Visit, which earned her the Tony Award for Best Actress in a Musical, along with the Grammy Award for Best Musical Theater Album and the Daytime Emmy Award for Outstanding Musical Performance in a Daytime Program.

Lenk also performed the lead role of Bobbie in the 2021 gender-swapped revival of Stephen Sondheim's musical Company. Lenk's additional stage credits include roles in the Broadway productions of Spider-Man: Turn Off the Dark, Once, and Indecent, as well as roles in regional theater productions.

== Early life and education ==
Lenk was born in Chicago, Illinois to a family of Eastern European descent. Though it has been claimed that she is of a Russian ethnic background, she has preferred to discuss her heritage with ambiguity. She attended Barrington High School in Barrington, Illinois. After enrolling at the School of Music at Northwestern University, she graduated in 1997 while majoring in viola performance and studying voice and musical theatre.

== Career ==
Lenk appeared as Yitzak in Hedwig and the Angry Inch at the Broadway Theatre, Chicago, in May 2001. She performed as Linda Lovelace in the musical Lovelace: A Rock Musical in 2008 at the Hayworth Theatre, Los Angeles, about which the L. A. Weekly wrote: "As Linda, Katrina Lenk is sensational—she has a dozen nuanced smiles that range from innocent and shattered to grateful, in order to express whatever passes as kindness when, say, a male co-star (Josh Greene) promises to make their scene fun."

She made her Broadway debut in The Miracle Worker in March 2010 as the understudy for the roles of Annie Sullivan and Kate Keller. She joined the cast of the Broadway musical Once in May 2013, in the role of Réza, the violinist.

In 2015 she appeared in the Yale Repertory Theatre world premiere of Indecent by Paula Vogel. She then appeared in the 2016 Off-Broadway production at the Vineyard Theatre, followed by the Broadway production at the Cort Theatre in 2017. In her review for Newsday, Linda Winer noted the "...dancing, singing actors as the earthy, sensual Katrina Lenk." For her performance she received the 2017 Theatre World Award Dorothy Loudon Award for Excellence. A performance of the play was filmed for television and broadcast on PBS in November 2017.

Lenk appeared on Broadway as Dina in the 2017 musical The Band's Visit, for which she won the 2018 Tony Award for Best Actress in a Musical. Craig Nakano of the Los Angeles Times wrote: "For Lenk, the role is another turning point. After studying music and theater at Northwestern University, Lenk devoted herself to theater in California.... it’s her poignant, heart-aching turn as Dina that is poised to make her a star."

She is the creator of musical persona and stage act Moxy Phinx.

Lenk starred in the lead role of Bobbie, opposite Patti LuPone as Joanne, in a gender-swapped revival of Stephen Sondheim's Company, which started previews on Broadway at the Bernard B. Jacobs Theatre on March 2 and was scheduled to open on March 22, 2020, until delayed by the COVID-19 pandemic. The production resumed previews on November 15, 2021, for an opening date of December 9, 2021. Lenk also appeared in the final season of Ozark, playing the role of Clare. In 2026, Lenk voiced Madame Giry in Erin A. Craig's audiobook Our Strange Duet (2026), a new reimagining and followup to Andrew Lloyd Webber's musical The Phantom of the Opera.

== Theatre ==
Year(s)	Production	Role	Location	Category
2000	Gigi	Gigi	Theatre at the Center, Munster, Indiana	Regional
2000	Proposals	Sammii	Theatre at the Center, Munster, Indiana	Regional
2001	Hedwig and the Angry Inch	Yitzhak	Broadway Theatre, Chicago	Regional
2001	42nd Street	Peggy Sawyer	Theatre at the Center, Munster, Indiana	Regional
2002	A Christmas Carol	Fiddler/Ensemble	Goodman Theatre, Chicago, Illinois	Regional
2005	Lost Land	Anna	Steppenwolf Theatre, Chicago, Illinois	Regional
2005	Cat on a Hot Tin Roof	Maggie/Mae (understudy)	Geffen Playhouse, Los Angeles, California	Regional
2005	The Caucasian Chalk Circle	Grusha	South Coast Repertory, Costa Mesa, California	Regional
2006	Camille	Camille	Bard SummerScape, New York	Regional
2007	Safety	Tanya	Closet Space Theater, Los Angeles, California	Regional
2007	iWitness	Margaret	Mark Taper Forum, Los Angeles	Regional
2007	Chicago	Velma Kelly	Hudson Backstage Theatre, Hollywood, California	Regional
2008	Lovelace: A Rock Musical	Linda Lovelace	Hayworth Theatre, Los Angeles, California	Regional
2009	Creature from the Black Lagoon: The Musical	Kay	Universal Studios Hollywood, Los Angeles, California	Regional
2010	Lovelace: A Rock Musical	Linda Lovelace	Edinburgh Fringe, Edinburgh, Scotland, UK	International Festival
2010	Peter Pan, or The Boy Who Would Not Grow Up	Mrs. Darling/Slightly	The Alley Theatre, Houston, Texas	Regional
2010	The Miracle Worker	Annie Sullivan, Kate Keller (understudy)	Circle in the Square Theatre	Broadway
2011	Cabaret	Fräulein Kost	Freud Playhouse at UCLA, Los Angeles, California	Regional
2012	Cloudlands	Caroline	South Coast Repertory Orange County, California	Regional
2012	Elemeno Pea	Michaela	South Coast Repertory Orange County, California	Regional
2012–2013	Spider-Man: Turn Off the Dark	Arachne (replacement)	Lyric Theatre	Broadway
2013–2015	Once	Réza (replacement)	Bernard B. Jacobs Theatre	Broadway
2015	Indecent	Manke	Yale Repertory Theatre, New Haven, Connecticut	Commissioned
2015	Indecent	Manke	La Jolla Playhouse, San Diego, California	Regional
2016	Indecent	Manke	Vineyard Theatre	Off-Broadway
2016–2017	The Band's Visit	Dina	Atlantic Theater Company	Off-Broadway
2017	Indecent	Manke	Cort Theatre	Broadway
2017–2019	The Band's Visit	Dina	Ethel Barrymore Theatre	Broadway
2020	Company	Bobbie	Bernard B. Jacobs Theatre	Broadway
2021–2022	Company	Bobbie	Bernard B. Jacobs Theatre	Broadway
2026	3Penny Opera	Pirate Jenny	The Theatre at St. Jean's	Off-Broadway
2026	High Spirits	Elvira	New York City Center	Off-Broadway, Encores!

== Filmography ==
=== Film ===
Year	Title	Role	Notes
2003	The Acedia Thing	Poet	
2004	Liar!	Moira	Short film
2004	Volare	Candy patron No. 1	Short film
2005	Space Daze	Elania Hoffman	Video
2006	Kiss Me in the Dark	Woman	Short film
2007	Crime Fiction	Lauren	Short film
2007	The Grand Inquisitor	Auditioning Jesus	
2009	White Widow	—N/a	Short film
2009	Preservation	Viola/Vera	Short film
2009	Love on the Tundra	Alexia	Short film
2010	Chateau Belvedere	Genevieve Masolowski	Short film
2010	Happy. Thank You. More. Please.	—N/a	Music credit only: "Phosphorescent Green"
2012	Arthur and the Bunnies	Sara	Short film
2013	One for My Baby	Actress	Short film
2014	The Vigilante	Agent Stansfield	Short film
2015	FracKtured	Del	Short film
2016	Élan Vital	Christine	
2016	Evol: The Theory of Love	Yolanda	
2019	Love Is Blind	Dr. Shine	

=== Television ===
Year	Title	Role	Notes
2003	Will & Grace	Marta the Maid	Episode: "Fagmalion Part 4: The Guy Who Loved Me"
2005	Studio House	Starlet	TV movie
2006	According to Jim	Nurse	Episode: "Belaboring the Point"
2009	Ruby & the Rockits	Lady No. 2	Episode: "Hot for Spanish Teacher"
2014	The Blacklist	Carrie Anne Beck	Episode: "The Front (No. 74)"
2015	Elementary	Sonia	Episode: "The Illustrious Client"
2016	Miss Teri	Meta	Episode: "Pilot" (Web series, co-creator, writer)
2017	The Get Down	Ruby Con	Episode: "Gamble Everything"
2017	Indecent	Manke	TV production of stage play
2017–2018	The Good Fight	Naftali Amato	Recurring role; 3 episodes
2017–2018	The Marvelous Mrs. Maisel	Cosma	Episodes: "Put That on Your Plate!", "All Alone"
2019	The Village	Claire Danville	Recurring role; 4 episodes
2020	Tommy	Kiley Mills	Recurring role; 5 episodes
2020	Little Voice	Mary King	Episodes: "Sea Change", "Sing What I Can't Say"
2022	Ozark	Clare Shaw	10 episodes
2024	Apples Never Fall	Lucia Fortino	Miniseries; 4 episodes

== Awards and nominations ==
Year	Award	Category	Work	Result	Ref
2017	Theatre World Award	Dorothy Loudon Award for Excellence in the Theatre	—N/a	Honoree	
2017	Outer Critics Circle Award	Outstanding Featured Actress in a Play	Indecent	Nominated	
2017	Outer Critics Circle Award	Outstanding Actress in a Musical	The Band's Visit	Nominated	
2017	Lucille Lortel Award	Outstanding Lead Actress in a Musical	The Band's Visit	Won	
2018	Tony Award	Best Actress in a Musical	The Band's Visit	Won	
2018	Drama League Award	Distinguished Performance	The Band's Visit	Nominated	
2018	Chita Rivera Award for Dance and Choreography	Outstanding Female Dancer in a Broadway Show	The Band's Visit	Nominated	
2019	Grammy Award	Best Musical Theater Album	The Band's Visit	Won	
2019	Daytime Emmy Award	Outstanding Musical Performance in a Daytime Program (with the cast of The Band's Visit)	The Band's Visit	Won	
