= Nacht van de Wansmaak =

Flemish film festival

Nacht van de Wansmaak (translation: "Night of Repulsion") is a Flemish-Dutch film festival dedicated to cult films, exploitation films and other bizarre B-films.

== Concept ==
The festival is organized by Belgian film director Jan Verheyen (under the alias of "Max Rockatansky") and Dutch film director and journalist Jan Doense (under the alias of "Mr. Horror"). They provide the live introduction to each movie and film trailer shown at the festival. The event tours throughout the Netherlands and Flanders during all the important film theaters in Rotterdam, Utrecht, Groningen, Enschede, Amsterdam, Vlissingen, Ghent, Hasselt, Antwerp, Kortrijk, Biddinghuizen, Vlieland, Arnhem, Breda, Koersel-Beringen, Eindhoven, Leiden, Amersfoort, Nijmegen, Roeselare, Deventer, Zwolle and Brussels.

In 1986 Verheyen organized a "Nacht van de Rariteiten" ("Night of the Oddities") film festival in De Vooruit in Ghent. Despite having a low attendance of only 12 people the idea was reorganized into a full-blown film festival on 28 April 1990 in Rotterdam, which had more success. Under the new name "Nacht van de Wansmaak" the festival became a recurring event in 1997, 2001, 2003, 2004-2006 and again in 2014.

During the late 1990s and early 2000s Verheyen also presented a TV show on the Flemish network Kanaal 2 (nowadays 2BE) under the title "Nacht van de Wansmaak".

In 2003 two DVD's with trailers of obscure B-movies were released.,

== Editions ==
- De Nacht van de Wansmaak (1990)
- De Return of the Nacht van de Wansmaak (1997)
- De Nacht van de Wansmaak Strikes Back (2001)
- De Nacht van de Wansmaak Reloaded (2003)
- The Night of Bad Taste (2004–2006)
- De Nacht van de Wansmaak Has Risen from the Grave (2014)

== Films that have been showcased during the festival ==
- The Acid Eaters (1968)
- Angel Above - The Devil Below (1974)
- La bestia in calore (1977)
- The Brainiac (1962)
- Blood Feast (1963)
- The Colossus of New York (1958)
- The Crippled Masters (1979)
- Deadly Weapons (1974)
- Doctor Butcher Medical Deviate (1979)
- Double Agent 73 (1974)
- The Executioner, a.k.a. Massacre Mafia Style (1978)
- For Your Height Only (1981)
- From Hell It Came (1957)
- Gappa: The Triphibian Monster (1967)
- The Giant Spider Invasion (1975)
- The Green Slime (1968)
- Horror of the Blood Monsters (1970)
- The Human Tornado (1976)
- The Island of Dr. Moreau (1996)
- I Want More (1970)
- Ilsa, Harem Keeper of the Oil Sheiks (1976)
- Intensive Care (1991)
- Love After Death (film) (1968)
- The Mighty Gorga (1969)
- Queen of Outer Space (1958)
- The Thing With Two Heads (1972)
- Two Thousand Maniacs! (1964)
- Woensdag (2005)
- Zaat (1971)
