= Chuck Traynor =

American actor (1937–2002)

- Linda Lovelace and Chuck Traynor in 1972
- Born: Charles Everett Traynor; August 21, 1937; Westchester County, New York, U.S.
- Died: July 22, 2002 (aged 64); Chatsworth, California, U.S.
- Occupations: Talent agent; businessman; actor
- Spouses: Linda Lovelace (m. 1971; div. 1974) Marilyn Chambers (m. 1975; div. 1985)

Charles Everett Traynor (August 21, 1937 – July 22, 2002) was an American actor, businessman, and talent agent. He was best known for promoting the pornography careers of his ex-wives, Linda Lovelace and Marilyn Chambers. Lovelace wrote in her autobiography, Ordeal (1980), that Traynor was abusive during their marriage and that he threatened and coerced her into her role in Deep Throat (1972).

== Career ==
Traynor was a minor figure in the early East Coast pornographic film industry and appeared in a number of short "loops" in the early 1970s, usually with his then-wife, Linda Lovelace. He was the production manager of the 1972 movie Deep Throat.

== Relationship with Linda Lovelace ==
Gloria Steinem discussed Traynor and Lovelace's relationship in a 1980 article in Ms. magazine, "The Real Linda Lovelace". Steinem stated that "the myth that Lovelace loved to be sexually used and humiliated was created by her husband" and that he kept her as his prisoner. Lovelace claimed that Traynor forced her into prostitution by threatening her with a gun, repeatedly beat her, forced her to make pornography, and allowed men to rape her repeatedly. Lovelace tried to escape from Traynor three times before she was successful. She said that during Deep Throat one can see scars and bruises left on her legs from a beating by Traynor. According to Steinem, Traynor once stated, "When I first dated [Linda] she was so shy, it shocked her to be seen nude by a man... I created Linda Lovelace."

Traynor married Marilyn Chambers after Lovelace divorced him. Traynor said in a Vanity Fair article about Chambers that he considered himself a country boy, in that he could live away from civilization and that if his woman said something that he didn't like, he thought nothing of hitting her for it.

Lovelace's accusations provoked mixed responses. Traynor admitted to striking Lovelace but said it was part of a voluntary sex game. In Legs McNeil's and Jennifer Osborne's 2005 book The Other Hollywood, several witnesses, including Deep Throat director Gerard Damiano, state that Traynor beat Lovelace behind closed doors, but they also question her credibility. Marilyn Chambers said that Lovelace's allegations "hurt Chuck". Deep Throat, Part 2 actress Andrea True said that most people did not like Chuck Traynor and sided with Lovelace. Lovelace's sister, Barbara Boreman, later said in an interview in Inside Deep Throat that she was disappointed that Traynor died before she could kill him. In the second commentary on the DVD of Inside Deep Throat, one member of the production crew of Deep Throat also alleged that Traynor beat Lovelace.

Traynor was portrayed by actor Peter Sarsgaard in the 2013 film Lovelace.

== Death ==
Traynor died at the age of 64 of a heart attack in Chatsworth, California, on July 22, 2002, three months after Lovelace died from massive trauma and internal injuries as a result of a car accident in Colorado.
