= The Deep Throat Sex Scandal =

American play

- Poster used to advertise the original Off-Broadway (2010) and Los Angeles (2013) runs of The Deep Throat Sex Scandal
- Written by: David Bertolino
- Genre: Romantic comedy, drama

Premiere
- Date: May 10, 2010
- Place: Bleecker Street Theater

The Deep Throat Sex Scandal is an American play by David Bertolino. It follows the life and career of Harry Reems as he enters the pornography industry, eventually filming Deep Throat opposite Linda Lovelace, and its resultant infamy and obscenity trial in Memphis, Tennessee.

The play originally was produced Off-Broadway at the 45 Bleecker Street theatre. Previews began September 17, 2010 with Malcolm Madera as Reems and Lori Gardner as Lovelace for director Jerry Douglas. Bertolino also served as producer. Additional cast members include Graham Stuart Allen, Frank Blocker, Stephen Hope, John-Charles Kelly, Rita Rehn and Zach Wegner.

Production Stage Manager: Ernie Fimbres, Assistant Stage Manager: Jeremy Neal, Set Design: Josh Iacovelli, Wardrobe: Jeffrey Wallach, Lighting Design: Graham Kindred, Sound Design: Phillip Rudy.

It opened October 10, 2010, and abruptly closed two days later following a dispute with the venue's landlord.

== Los Angeles production (2013) ==
Bertolino transferred the production to Los Angeles in 2013. Following one week of previews, it opened on January 31, 2013, and ran through April 14. Douglas returned to direct. Blocker was the only cast member to reprise his roles from the New York production. Marc Ginsburg and Natasha Charles Parker were cast as Reems and Lovelace, respectively, joining Brett Aune, Michael Rachlis, Bart Tangredi and Alec Tomkiw. Frank Blocker reprised his role as DA Larry Parrish, the only original cast member from the New York production. Adult-film actors Herschel Savage and Veronica Hart joined to generate additional interest among porn fans; Bertolino also arranged for a recurring series of celebrity cameos: Sally Kirkland, Bruce Vilanch, Christopher Knight and adult actors Nina Hartley, Hyapatia Lee, Jasmin St. Claire, Rebecca Bardoux William Margold, and Alana Evans are among those who appeared during the show's run.

Reems died during the Los Angeles run of The Deep Throat Sex Scandal, and his passing was noted by the production.

The Los Angeles production received a 75-percent "bittersweet" rating from an aggregate of 12 reviews on Bitter Lemons.

== Movie version (2013-) ==
Following the closure of the Los Angeles production, Bertolino announced his intentions to produce a movie version of his play through an Indiegogo crowdfunding campaign. At the campaign's conclusion, he had raised more than $25,000, meeting his original goals.
