= Porchlight Music Theatre =

Chicago theater company

- Founded: 1994
- Type: Theatrical productions
- Location: Chicago, Illinois
- Website: porchlightmusictheatre.org

Porchlight Music Theatre is a professional theatre company in Chicago, Illinois that has won numerous Joseph Jefferson Awards in its 25-year history. The company has come to embody the slogan "American musicals. Chicago style".

== About ==
Its initial production in 1995 was the premiere of Women Who Love Science Too Much by K.R. Cahill and directed by William Eric Bramlett. Starring the founding artistic director Jill Moore.

In 2010, Michael Weber took over artistic direction. Weber previously served as artistic director for the inaugural season of Drury Lane Theatre Water Tower Place (now the Broadway Playhouse) and at Theatre at the Center (1998–2004).

During the 2016–2017 season, the theatre attracted record attendance with its staging of In the Heights. This production changed the face of the company and helped the company move to the Ruth Page Center for the Arts, in Chicago's Gold Coast.

== Productions ==
Season	Productions
1995–1996	Women Who Love Science Too Much / Macabaret / Family Album / Three Sisters
1996–1997	The Still Time / Macabaret / Hereafter
1997–1998	Macabaret / The Vanishing Point
1998–1999	Ruthless! / Falsettos
1999–2000	Colette Collage / Merrily We Roll Along
2000–2001	Into the Woods / Passion
2001–2002	A Little Night Music / Children of Eden / A New Brain
2002–2003	Promises, Promises / Company
2003–2004	Cabaret / Amadeus
2004–2005	Sweeney Todd / Closer Than Ever
2005–2006	Gypsy / Macabaret / The Secret Garden
2006–2007	A Wonderful Life / Assassins / The Teapot Scandals / Ragtime
2007–2008	Phantom / A Wonderful Life / Nine
2008–2009	Candide / Pacific Overtures / Once on This Island
2009–2010	The Fantasticks / Macabaret / Miracle on 34th Street / Meet John Doe
2010–2011	Sunday in the Park with George / Miracle on 34th Street / Meet John Doe / The King & I
2011–2012	Putting It Together / A Catered Affair / tick, tick...BOOM!
2012–2013	A Class Act / Gifts of the Magi / Lady Day at Emerson's Bar and Grill / Pal Joey
2013–2014	Double Trouble / Ain't Misbehavin' / How to Succeed in Business Without Really Trying
2014–2015	Sweeney Todd / Sondheim on Sondheim / A Funny Thing Happened on the Way to the Forum
2015–2016	Side Show / Ain't Misbehavin' / Far From Heaven / Dreamgirls
2016–2017	In the Heights / End of the Rainbow / The Scottsboro Boys / Marry Me a Little
2017–2018	Billy Elliot / Merrily We Roll Along / Memphis
2018–2019	Gypsy / A Gentleman's Guide to Love and Murder / A Chorus Line
2019–2020	Sunset Boulevard / Sophisticated Ladies / Freaky Friday
2021-2022	Pump Boys & Dinettes / Blues in the Night / Spring Awakening
2022-2023	Rent / Cabaret / Ernest Shackleton Loves Me
2023-2024	Anything Goes / Sunday in the Park with George
2024-2025	Fun Home / Titanique
2025-2026	Making Marilyn Miller – An Immersive Musical / The Irish... and How They Got That Way / Follies

== New Faces Sing Broadway Series ==
Porchlight created this revue series which runs for one to two nights. It is an audience-interactive event that encompasses the 'hits and misses' of a given season on Broadway. The night is emceed by a local theatre star and showcases ten rising music theatre talents.

== Porchlight Revisits Series ==
Since 2013, the company has staged series' of 'lost' musicals. There are three of these productions per season. Each production runs for three nights. Before each performance, there is a "Behind the Show Backstory" multimedia presentation by Artistic Director Michael Weber explaining the history of the production.

== Education ==
Since 2014, the company has offered children and professional artists the opportunity to pursue training in singing, dancing, acting, and writing. It is an environment where working artists can practice and create with other artists. It provides scholarship events and offers summer camps and school-year programming for local teachers. Porchlight also offers rehearsal space to rent out.

== Awards ==
Porchlight Music Theatre has received a total of 42 Jeff Awards and 139 Jeff Award nominations. They have additionally received 7 Black Theatre Alliance awards and 22 Black Theatre Alliance nominations.

Below are the productions that have won an Equity Joseph Jefferson Award and the season in which it was won.

Season	Production
2012–2013	A Class Act
2013–2014	Ain't Misbehavin'
2014–2015	Sondheim on Sondheim
2015–2016	Dreamgirls
2016–2017	The Scottsboro Boys
