= Mike McGrady =

American journalist and author (1933–2012)

- Born: Michael Robinson McGrady; October 4, 1933; New York City, U.S.
- Died: May 13, 2012 (aged 78); Shelton, Washington, U.S.
- Education: Yale University
- Occupations: Journalist; author
- Employer: Newsday
- Notable work: Naked Came the Stranger
- Spouse: Corinne Young (m. 1959)
- Children: 3

Michael Robinson McGrady (October 4, 1933 – May 13, 2012) was an American journalist and author. He is best known for orchestrating the 1969 literary hoax Naked Came the Stranger, a novel he wrote with a group of fellow Newsday journalists as an attempt to parody the bestsellers of the era, with the book becoming a hit in its own right.

== Early and personal life ==
McGrady was born in New York City, and grew up in Lilliwaup, Washington and Port Washington, New York. He graduated from Yale University in 1955, and was a Nieman Fellow at Harvard University in 1968 and 1969.

In 1959, McGrady married Corinne Young, and they had three children. He had one previous marriage which ended in divorce.

== Career ==
In 1962, McGrady became a columnist for Newsday, a newspaper based on Long Island, where he wrote about the civil rights movement and the Vietnam War. His columns about the war, written from the frontlines in a series called a A Dove in Vietnam, won an award from the Overseas Press Club in 1967 and were later published as a book.

=== Naked Came the Stranger ===
In 1966, he assembled a group of two dozen fellow Newsday writers to create novel that would parody the prurient bestsellers of the era, which he found to be badly written, citing Jacqueline Susann's Valley of the Dolls as a particular impetus. He wanted the book to be sexually explicit and of low literary quality, and had each participant write one deliberately poor chapter. McGrady told the authors that "true excellence in writing" would be removed, as he wanted to demonstrate that the work's sexual content alone could guarantee its success.

Naked Came the Stranger follows a housewife who, after learning her husband is having an extramarital affair, decides to have as many affairs of her own as she can. Each chapter describes an encounter with a different man, which include lawyers, businessmen, a member of the mafia, and a rabbi. It was written under the pseudonym "Penelope Ashe", who was represented in photographs and early interviews by Billie Young, McGrady's sister-in-law. It was co-edited with Harvey Aronson, a Newsday editor, and published in 1969 by Lyle Stuart, who often published controversial books. As McGrady had hoped, the novel was a bestseller. Its true authorship was acknowledged shortly after its release, though this only brought further attention; it sold about 20,000 copies before the hoax was revealed, and sales more than quadrupled afterward. A subsequent paperback run sold over a million copies.

McGrady later said he was offered $500,000 (equivalent to $4,389,746 in 2025) to write a sequel, but he turned it down. He subsequently wrote an "instructional manual" based on the creation of the book, called Stranger than Naked: Or, How to Write Dirty Books for Fun and Profit (1970).

=== Later career ===
McGrady continued with Newsday, though he did take time off to write other books, such as The Kitchen Sink Papers: My Life as a Househusband (1975), in which he spent a year as a homemaker while his wife was the family's sole breadwinner. He said the experience made his marriage stronger, and led to him and his wife establishing equity in sharing home and professional duties. He also co-wrote two of Linda Lovelace's memoirs, Ordeal (1980) and Out of Bondage (1986).

In 1982, McGrady became Newsday's film critic, a position he held until he retired in 1990.

== Later life and death ==
After retirement, McGrady moved from Northport, New York back to Lilliwaup with his wife. He died from pneumonia at a hospital in Shelton, Washington on May 13, 2012, at the age of 78.

== Books by Mike McGrady ==
Based primarily on the Library of Congress catalog.

- Youth and the FBI, with John J. Floherty, foreword by J. Edgar Hoover (Lippincott, 1960)
- Crime Scientists (Lippincott, 1961)
- Whirling Wings: The Story of the Helicopter, with John J. Floherty (Lippincott, 1961)
- Jungle Doctors (Lippincott, 1962)
- Skin Diving Adventures, with John J. Floherty (Lippincott, 1962)
- A Dove in Vietnam (Funk & Wagnalls, 1968)
- Naked Came the Stranger (Lyle Stuart, 1969) — under the pseudonym Penelope Ashe; McGrady took credit for "1/25th" of the book
- Stranger than Naked, or How to Write Dirty Books for Fun and Profit (P. H. Wyden, 1970)
- The Kitchen Sink Papers: My Life as a Househusband (Doubleday, 1975) — reissues: New American Library, 1976; Reader's Digest, 1976
- Establishment of Innocence, with Harvey Aronson (Putnam, 1976) — reissue: Berkley, 1977
- The Motel Tapes (Warner, 1977)
- The Husband's Cookbook (Lippincott, 1979)
- Ordeal, with Linda Lovelace (Citadel, 1980) — reissues: Bell, 1980; Berkley, 1981; Barricade, 1989; Kensington, 2006
- Out of Bondage, with Linda Lovelace, foreword by Gloria Steinem (Lyle Stuart, 1986) — reissues: Berkley, 1987; Barricade, 1989; Kensington, 2006
- Best Restaurants on Long Island (Citadel, 1986)
