= Forced Entry (1973 film) =

1973 film by Shaun Costello

- Film poster
- Directed by: Shaun Costello
- Written by: Shaun Costello
- Produced by: Jerald Intrator; Shaun Costello; John Klugerman
- Starring: Harry Reems; Laura Cannon
- Cinematography: Jayson Black
- Edited by: Shaun Costello
- Music by: Santino DiOrici
- Production company: Boojum Productions
- Distributed by: Variety Films
- Release dates: March 16, 1973 (San Diego, California)
- Running time: 83 minutes
- Country: United States
- Language: English
- Budget: $6,200

Forced Entry is a 1973 adult horror film written and directed by Shaun Costello under the pseudonym Helmuth Richler. It stars Harry Reems (credited as Tim Long) as an unnamed and psychotic Vietnam War veteran who sexually assaults and kills women who stop at the filling station where he works as an attendant. Called "one of the most disturbing and unpleasant porn features ever made," the film utilizes actual footage of the war, predominantly in the rape and murder sequences.

== Plot ==
After opening with newspaper articles, footage, and quotes relating to the Vietnam War and the psychological condition of the American soldiers who have returned from it, the authorities are shown investigating a crime scene in which a man was shot in the head.

Going back an unspecified amount of time, the man is revealed to be a gas station attendant, and is shown coercing a female customer into giving out her name and address by claiming they are needed for a credit card transaction. After the woman drives away, the attendant goes to her apartment building, and watches through a window as she has sex with her husband. When the husband leaves, the attendant breaks into the apartment and forces the woman to perform oral sex on him while he verbally abuses her, slitting her throat after he climaxes.

Back at the gas station, the attendant gives a lost motorist directions, and follows her to the address she was looking for. The man breaks into the house, drags the woman out of the shower, and forces her to fellate him at gunpoint. He then sodomizes her, stabs her, and kisses her as she dies. Later, a ditzy female hippie picks up an equally vapid hitchhiker, and the two travel to the gas station. The attendant tricks the driver into giving out her address, and goes to her home, where she and her companion are doing drugs, and having sex. The attendant sneaks in and tries to force the girls to submit to him, but the pair are too intoxicated to take him seriously, frustrating him to the point of a psychotic break. As he screams "Stay away from me!" and has a series of flashbacks to both the war and the rapes and murders he has committed, the attendant shoots himself in the head. Returning to the intro, the man's body is covered by a sheet, and hauled away by the police.

== Cast ==
- Harry Reems (as Tim Long) as Gas Station Attendant
- Laura Cannon as Lost Driver
- Jutta David as Trish
- Shaun Costello as David
- Ruby Runhouse as Hippie Girl
- Nina Fawcett as Hippie Girl

== Reception ==
In his autobiography, star Harry Reems wrote that Forced Entry was the one film he regretted doing.

DVD Talk gave the film zero stars, calling it "morally repugnant".

Noting the film is "the first film to show a disturbed war vet coming home from Vietnam," Ed Demko calls the film "one of the more important and relevant films to ever come out of that age of pornography. It’s a film that really transcends the time that it was made and might even be more important now than the age it was made. Sure there’s a ton of nasty sexual activity in the film but the subject matter and what the movie is actually saying goes way beyond that."

== Analysis ==
In "Forced Entry: Serial Killer Pornography as Patriarchical Paradox", scholar Robert Cettl assesses the film's role as pivotal in the history of American serial killer films and discusses its subversion of American patriarchy "by highlighting a paradox in relation to hegemonic masculinity" and how the director turns pornography "into self-conscious political discourse", arguing the film critiques patriarchical reaction to second-wave feminism (represented by the independently-living female victims) as grounded in war-mongering (rape-murder scenes interspersed with footage from the Vietnam War) and ultimately doomed to self-implosion (the killer's suicide).

== Remake ==
In 1975, the film had an R-rated remake starring Tanya Roberts and Ron Max.

== See also ==
- List of American films of 1973
- List of mainstream movies with unsimulated sex
