= David Bertolino =

American theme park founder, playwright, film and stage producer

- Born: Sudbury, Massachusetts, U.S.
- Known for: Founder of Spooky World; playwright and producer of The Deep Throat Sex Scandal; film and stage producer

David Bertolino is founder of Spooky World (also spelled Spookyworld and SpookyWorld), a popular New England horror attraction, and he is credited as a pioneer of "high-concept Halloween theme parks" by the Associated Press.

He was an expert witness on behalf of New Line Cinema in the case of New Line Cinema Corporation v. Russ Berrie & Company, Inc., regarding the sale of non-licensed movie replicas in the likeness of Freddy Krueger's razor glove.

Bertolino is also the playwright of the off-Broadway play The Deep Throat Sex Scandal, as well as a film producer.

== Early life ==
Bertolino was born in Sudbury, Massachusetts and worked in his family's joke and magic shop in downtown Boston. He later worked for Rubies Costumes as a regional manager.

== Career ==
During a Halloween trade show in 1990, Bertolino suggested the founding of the trade organization that would be known as the International Association of Haunted Attractions, a trade group for haunted houses and similar attractions.

In 1991, Bertolino secured a farmhouse and its surrounding land in Berlin, Massachusetts, as a haunted hayride attraction for Halloween and only for the month of October. In collaboration with special effects artist Tom Savini, Bertolino built out 22 stages and the hayride, and it was initially named Spooky Hayrides.

Berlin locals were employed as actors to scare the guests during the ride and in the lines, and to staff the venue. Celebrities featured in horror films appeared at the event, including Savini. Though Bertolino expected a modest turnout of about 200 people a night, attendance was at 2,000 for the first night. In 1997, The Boston Globe reported that the attendance for that year's Spooky World was expected to be 170,000 visitors.

The Spooky World name was decided on for the second Halloween opening, and Bertolino credits Savini with the new name. Savini designed a haunted house and the addition of a horror museum with props and memorabilia from horror movies. The site also housed six haunted houses, each with its own theme. Other celebrities that appeared at Spooky World included Linda Blair, Robert Englund, Kane Hodder, Gunnar Hansen, Butch Patrick, Cassandra Peterson, Bobby "Boris" Pickett, Alice Cooper, and Tiny Tim, among others.

Legal issues regarding permitting and fire safety caused Spooky World to close in 1998. It reopened in 1999 at the Gillette Stadium in Foxborough, leased on property from Robert Kraft. Bertolino decided to sell Spooky World in 2007; it was sold in 2009 and relocated to New Hampshire under new ownership.

In 1993, New Line Cinema sued Russ Berrie & Company, a toy manufacturer, over their "Ghastly Gasher" toy. New Line Cinema claimed it was a copy of Freddy Krueger's glove with razor blades. The case went to trial in 2001, and Bertolino was an expert witness for New Line Cinema. The case was found in favor of New Line Cinema.

In 2010, Bertolino wrote The Deep Throat Sex Scandal. It dramatized the production and obscenity trail surrounding the pornographic film Deep Throat through its lead actor, Harry Reems. It played off-Broadway, and was brought to Los Angeles in 2013. In 2017, he produced The Golden Age of Adult Cinema, a three-day panel that discussed the adult film industry's Golden Age in the 1970s to 1980s with the actors of the time.

Spooky World and Bertolino are the subjects of Spooktacular!, a 2023 documentary directed by Quinn Monahan, which premiered at Fantastic Fest. Bertolino was also executive producer of the movie, and produced Killing Joan, No Collateral and Hidden Agenda.

He also produced the play Mommy are We Poor? The play was the subject of the documentary Richie's Hollywood Pitch, which won the Best Documentary award at the Berlin Indie Film Festival in 2026.

His biography about Spooky World, Behind the Screams at Spookyworld: The Secrets, Scares, and Stars of America’s Original Horror Theme Park, is scheduled for release in May 2026.

== Selected Works ==
=== Films ===
- Killing Joan (2018), associate producer
- Hidden Agenda (2015), associate producer
- No Collateral (2012), executive producer
- Spooktacular! (2023), executive producer

=== Plays ===
- Mommy are We Poor?, producer
- The Deep Throat Sex Scandal, writer and producer

=== Books ===
- Behind the Screams at Spookyworld: The Secrets, Scares, and Stars of America’s Original Horror Theme Park (2026), ISBN 978-1577159179
