= Rape pornography =

Subgenre of pornography

Rape pornography is a subgenre of pornography involving the description or depiction of rape. Such pornography either involves simulated rape, wherein sexually consenting adults feign rape, or it involves actual rape. Victims of actual rape may be coerced to feign consent such that the pornography produced deceptively appears as simulated rape or non-rape pornography. The depiction of rape in non-pornographic media is not considered rape pornography. Simulated scenes of rape and other forms of sexual violence have appeared in mainstream cinema, including rape and revenge films, almost since its advent.

The legality of simulated rape pornography varies across legal jurisdictions. It is controversial because of the argument that it encourages people to commit rape. However, studies of the effects of pornography depicting sexual violence produce conflicting results. The creation of real rape pornography is a sex crime in countries where rape is illegal. Real rape pornography, including statutory rape in child pornography, is created for profit and other reasons. Rape pornography, as well as revenge porn and other similar subgenres depicting violence, has been associated with rape culture.

== Legality ==
=== United Kingdom ===
The possession of rape pornography is illegal in Scotland, and England and Wales.

In Scotland, the Criminal Justice and Licensing (Scotland) Act 2010 criminalised possession of "extreme" pornography. This included depictions of rape, and "other non-consensual penetrative sexual activity, whether violent or otherwise", including those involving consenting adults and images that were faked. The maximum penalty is an unlimited fine and 3 years imprisonment. The law is not often used, and it resulted in only one prosecution during the first four years that it was in force.

In England and Wales, it took another five years before pornography which depicts rape (including simulations involving consenting adults) was made illegal in England and Wales, bringing the law into line with that of Scotland. Section 63 of the Criminal Justice and Immigration Act 2008 had already criminalised possession of "extreme pornography" but it did not explicitly specify depictions of rape. At that time it was thought that the sale of rape pornography might already be illegal in England and Wales as a result of the Obscene Publications Act 1959, but the ruling in R v Peacock in January 2012 demonstrated that this was not the case. The introduction of a new law was first announced in 2013 by the UK Prime Minister David Cameron. In a speech to the NSPCC he stated that pornography that depicts simulated rape "normalise(s) sexual violence against women", although the Ministry of Justice criminal policy unit had previously stated that "we have no evidence to show that the creation of staged rape images involves any harm to the participants or causes harm to society at large".

In February 2015, Section 16 of the Criminal Justice and Courts Act 2015 amended the Criminal Justice and Immigration Act 2008 to criminalise the possession of pornographic imagery depicting acts of rape. The law only applies to consensual, simulated, fantasy material. The possession of an image capturing an actual rape, for example CCTV footage, is not illegal; but a "make-believe" image created by and for consenting adults is open to prosecution. In January 2014 sexual freedom campaign groups criticised Section 16 as being poorly defined and liable to criminalise a wider range of material than originally suggested. However, in April 2014 the BBFC's presentation to Parliament suggested that the proposed legislation would not cover "clearly fictional depictions of rape and other sexual violence in which participants are clearly actors, acting to a script".

=== Germany ===
In Germany, the distribution of pornography featuring real or faked rape is illegal.

=== United States ===
There are few practical legal restrictions on rape pornography in the United States. Law enforcement agencies concentrate on examples where they believe a crime has been committed in the production. "Fantasy" rape pornography depicting rape simulations involving consenting adults are not a priority for the police.

In response to the verdict of the People v. Turner sexual assault case, xHamster instituted a "Brock Turner rule", which banned videos involving rape, including those involving sex with an unconscious or hypnotised partner.

== Real rape cases ==
=== Offline ===
American porn actress Linda Lovelace wrote in her autobiography, Ordeal, that she was coerced and raped in pornographic films in the 1970s.

=== Internet ===
Internet policing with respect to investigating actual crime has been made increasingly difficult by rape pornography websites operating anonymously, ignoring ICANN regulations and providing false information for the WHOIS database.

From 2009 to 2020, the pornographic company GirlsDoPorn created hundreds of pornographic videos in which the women depicted were manipulated, coerced, lied to, given marijuana or other drugs or physically forced to have sex, according to the accounts of victims and material from a lawsuit against the company. Six people involved in the website were charged with sex trafficking by force, fraud and coercion in November 2019. Official videos from the company were viewed over a billion times, including a paid subscription service on its website, and an estimated 680 million views on the tube site Pornhub, where the official channel was among the site's top 20 most viewed. Pirated copies of the videos were also viewed hundreds of millions of times. According to a lawsuit, the videos could still be found on mainstream pornography websites up to at least December 2020.

Japanese women were forced to be in pornographic videos in the 2010s.

Real rape videos of women and girls were filmed in the Doctor's Room and Nth Room cases in South Korea in late 2010s and early 2020s.

Videos showing real rape have been hosted on popular pornographic video sharing and pornography websites. These websites have been criticized by petitioners.

==== Cybersex trafficking ====
Victims of cybersex trafficking have been forced into live streaming rape pornography, which can be recorded and later sold. They are raped by traffickers in front of a webcam or forced to perform sex acts on themselves or other victims. The traffickers film and broadcast the sex crimes in real time. Victims are frequently forced to watch the paying consumers on shared screens and follow their orders. It occurs in locations, commonly referred to as ‘cybersex dens,’ that can be in homes, hotels, offices, internet cafes, and other businesses.
