= Chesty Morgan =

American exotic dancer and actor

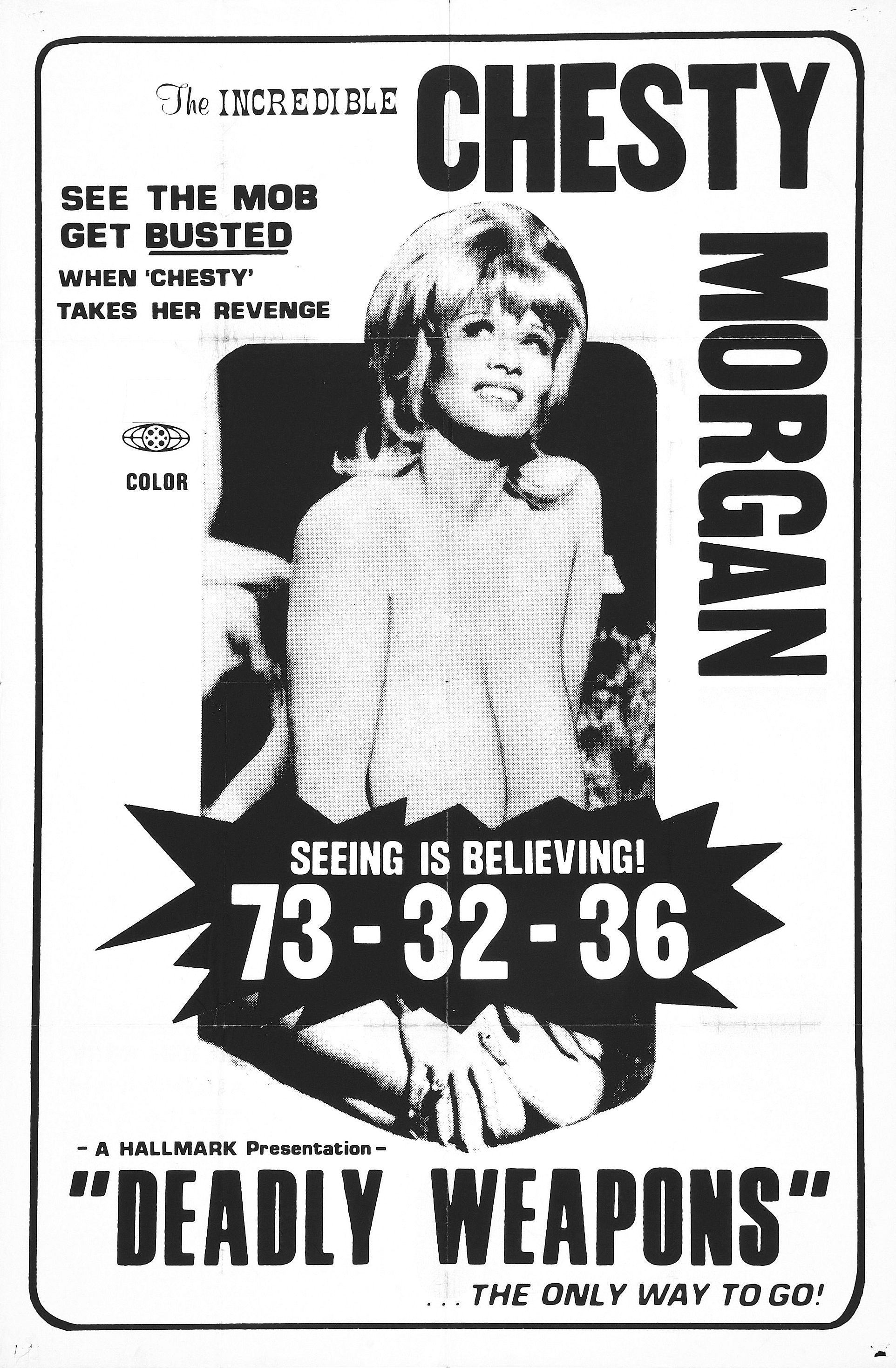
- Morgan in poster for Deadly Weapons (1974)
- Born: October 15, 1937 (age 89)
- Other names: Zsa Zsa, Chesty Gaborr
- Height: 5 ft 5 in (1.65 m)
- Spouse(s): Joseph Wilczkowski (1957– died 1965); Dick Stello (1974– div. 1979)

Ilana Wajc (born October 15, 1937), better known by her stage name Chesty Morgan, and also known as Liliana Wilczkowska and Lillian Stello, is a Polish-born, retired exotic dancer of Jewish descent, who also starred in two films directed by Doris Wishman. Morgan was billed as having a 73 inch (1.9 m) bust measurement.

== Early life ==
As a young girl growing up near Warsaw, Poland, she was orphaned when her Jewish parents were killed by the Nazis after the Invasion of Poland. Sent to Israel, she lived in a series of orphanages before ending up in a kibbutz.

== Career ==
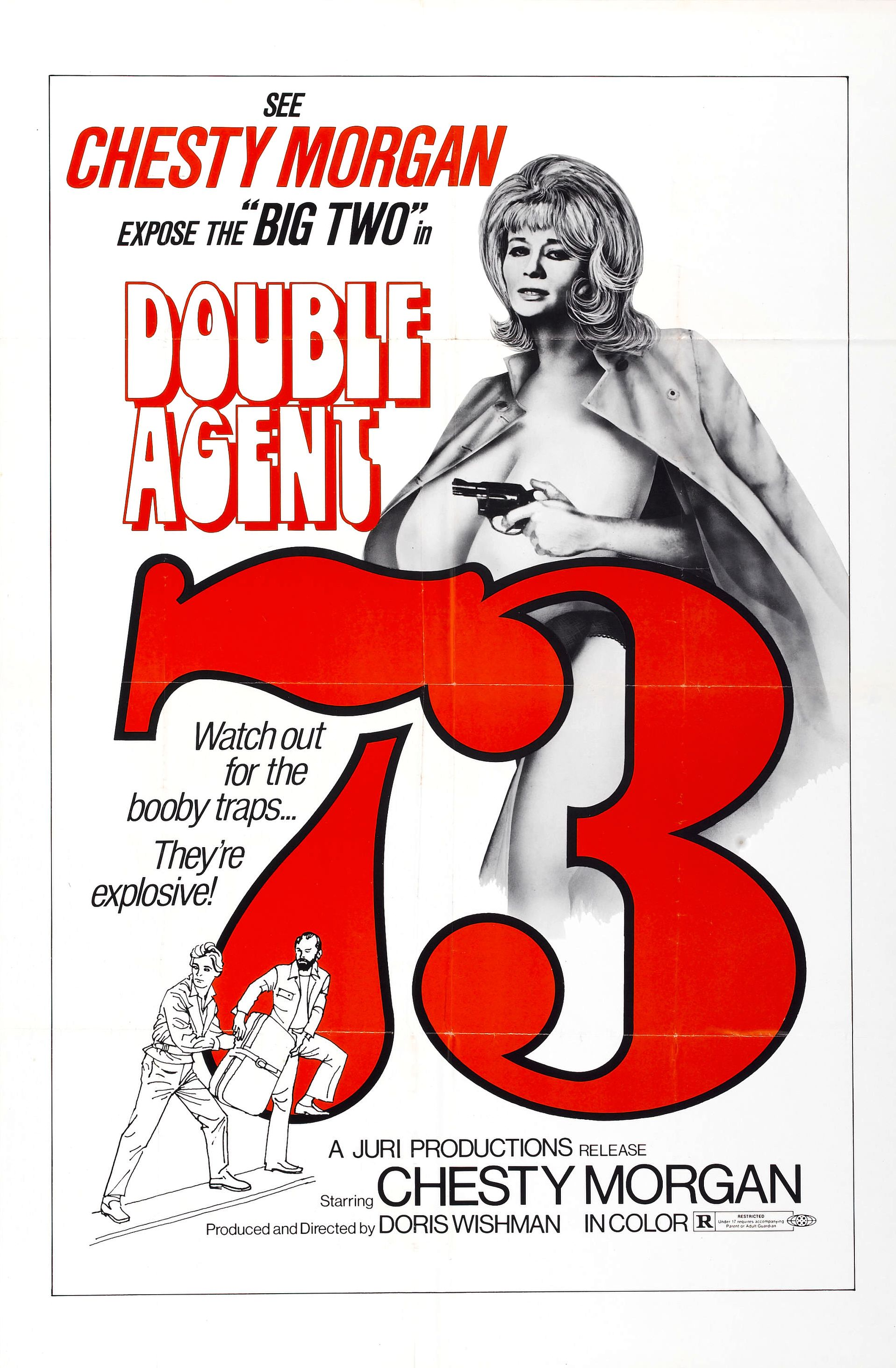
Poster for Double Agent 73

Morgan moved to the United States in the late 1950s. Following the death of her husband in 1965, she became a stripper, using the name Zsa Zsa. A nightclub owner suggested she call herself "Chesty Morgan". She never stripped below the waist, and in traditional burlesque fashion, valued the tease as much as the strip. She was occasionally arrested, allegedly for letting men near the stage touch the tops of her breasts to verify that they were real.

Unlike many of the modern adult entertainment stars with large breasts, Morgan's were not augmented with implants. According to the 1988 edition of Guinness Movie Facts & Feats, her bust measurement is the largest on record for a film star.

She starred in two Doris Wishman films in 1974: Deadly Weapons and Double Agent 73. She was also filmed by Federico Fellini as Barbarina in Fellini's Casanova, but her scenes were cut. Clips from Doris Wishman's two 1970s sexploitation films, based around Morgan's very large breasts, were featured in John Waters' 1994 film, Serial Mom. Waters also wrote a role for Morgan in his never-made feature Flamingos Forever.

== Personal life ==
In 1957, Morgan married an American, Josef Wilczkowski, and moved to New York. Wilczkowski was killed in a Brooklyn robbery in 1965, when she was 27, and her two daughters, Eva and Lila, were four years old and four months old, respectively. In 1974, Morgan married National League baseball umpire Dick Stello. The two divorced in 1979, but remained friends until Stello's death in a traffic accident in 1987. In 1984, her elder daughter Eva was also killed in a traffic accident.

== Retirement ==
Morgan's last performance as a stripper was in Houston on the first night of the Persian Gulf War in 1991. Since her retirement, she has lived in the Tampa Bay area of Florida.
