= Ordeal (autobiography) =

1980 Autobiography by Linda Lovelace

- Author: Linda Lovelace; Mike McGrady
- Language: English
- Subject: Pornography
- Publisher: Citadel Press
- Publication date: 1980
- Publication place: United States
- Media type: Print
- Pages: 253 pp.
- ISBN: 0806506873
- OCLC: 5674846

Ordeal is a 1980 autobiography by the former pornographic actress Linda Lovelace, with Mike McGrady.

== Ordeal ==
Lovelace (real name: Linda Boreman) is a star of the film Deep Throat, a seminal 1972 film at the forefront of the Golden Age of Porn. In the autobiography, Lovelace, with Mike McGrady recounts that she was raped during her career in the porn industry.

== Out of Bondage ==
Out of Bondage by Linda Lovelace, with Mike McGrady, recounts her later life.

== See also ==
- Anti-pornography movement
- Rape pornography
