= Double Agent 73 =

1974 American film by Doris Wishman

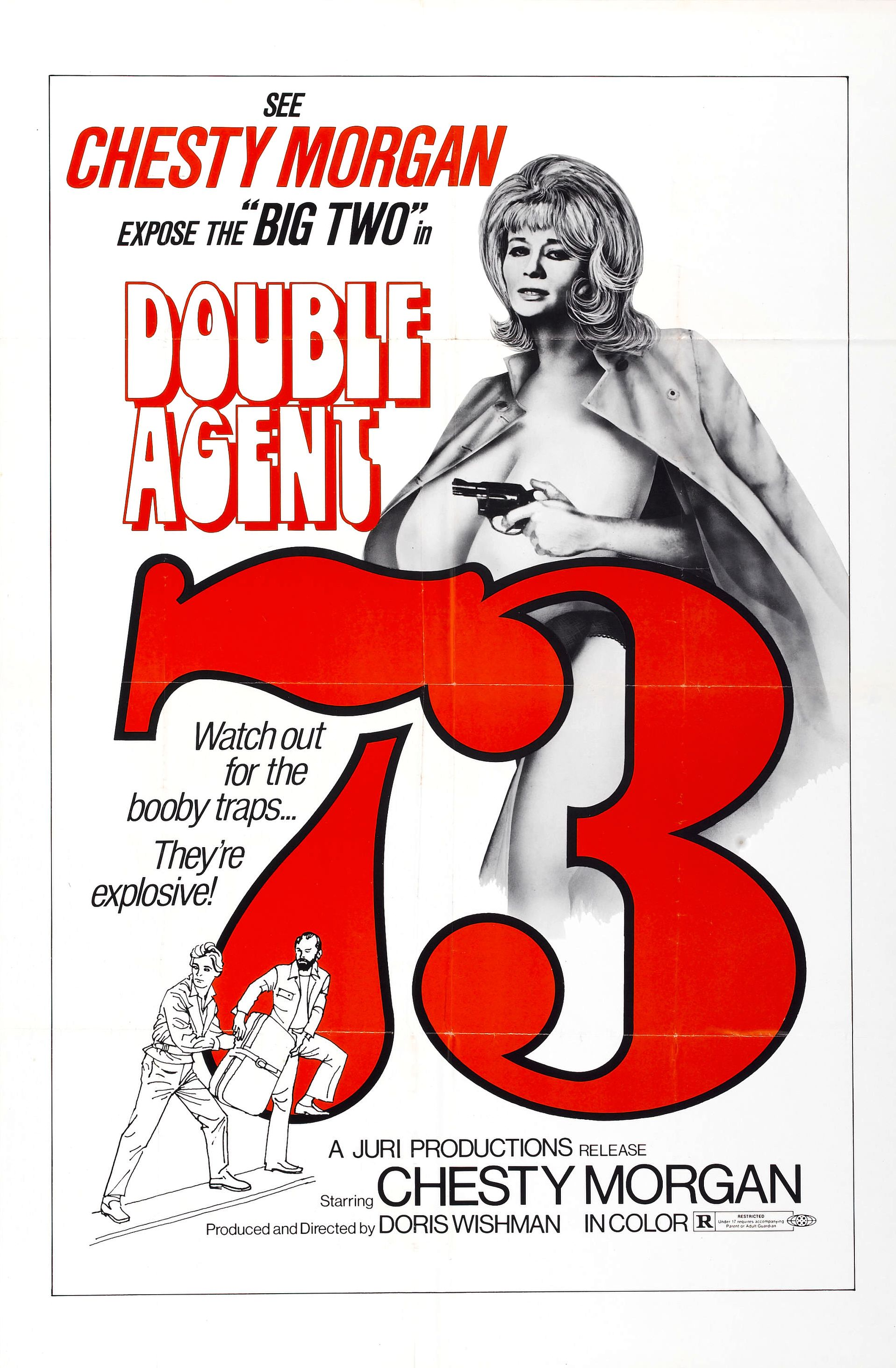
- Film poster
- Directed by: Doris Wishman
- Screenplay by: Doris Wishman
- Story by: Judy J. Kushner
- Produced by: Doris Wishman
- Starring: Chesty Morgan; Frank Silvano; Saul Meth; Jill Harris; Louis Burdi
- Cinematography: Yuri Haviv
- Edited by: Louis Burdi
- Production company: Juri Productions
- Distributed by: J.E.R. Pictures
- Release date: 1974
- Running time: 73 minutes
- Country: United States
- Language: English

Double Agent 73 is a 1974 American sexploitation spy film directed and produced by Doris Wishman and starring burlesque performer Chesty Morgan.

It has been described as a sequel to Deadly Weapons, also directed by Doris Wishman.

== Plot ==
Chesty Morgan, a woman whose bust is 73 inches (1.9 m) in size, plays Jane Tennay, a large breasted secret agent. Her agency wants her to assassinate, one by one, an organized crew of low grade heroin pushers. In order for her to prove her killings, they plant a tiny camera in her big left breast. Each time she needs a photo taken, she takes off her shirt and clicks over her left breast.

Unlike the previous film, there's no smothering and only one death sequence involves her monstrous breasts. In it, she ambushes and ties up a guy's girlfriend in their bathroom. She then rubs poison over her own breasts and climbs into the guy's bed. Even though the light is on and disregarding the huge difference in breasts' size, the sleepy guy thinks she is his girlfriend. He starts kissing her large breasts and soon after dies from the poison.

It turns out the agency planted a time-bomb inside the camera, as an insurance policy in case she is captured. Just in the nick of time Jane has all the photos she needed and is rushed to the hospital. The camera is removed and the photos reveal Jane's love interest is the head criminal. When they meet up, he confesses and asks her to marry him. Jane responds by shooting him dead and proceeding to her next mission.

== Reception ==
In his book Sleaze Artists: Cinema at the Margins of Taste, Style, and Politics, cultural historian Jeffrey Sconce suggests that, for feminist viewers steeped in leftist traditions that value self-reflexive art, Double Agent 73 may come across as a parody of those very ideas. He compares the work to a female version of Michael Powell's Peeping Tom (1960), noting that in the film, men become the objectified subjects, captured by the protagonist's lethal breast-mounted camera. However, he argues that any self-reflexive critique is overshadowed by the camera's exaggerated fixation on the protagonist's breasts, which dominate the screen in extended close-ups.

Film critic Joe Bob Briggs, who included several of Wishman's films in his The Sleaziest Movies in the History of the World video series, similarly remarks on the film's breast-centric imagery, asking, "Don’t you just get sick of looking at those boobies all the time?" Sconce notes that the film departs from the more diffuse fetishism of Wishman's earlier work, instead embracing a form of extreme fetishization that mirrors broader trends in the exploitation cinema of the era. He concludes that Wishman "quite literally rubs men's faces in it—fetishizing with a vengeance".

== See also ==
- List of American films of 1974
