= Deadly Weapons =

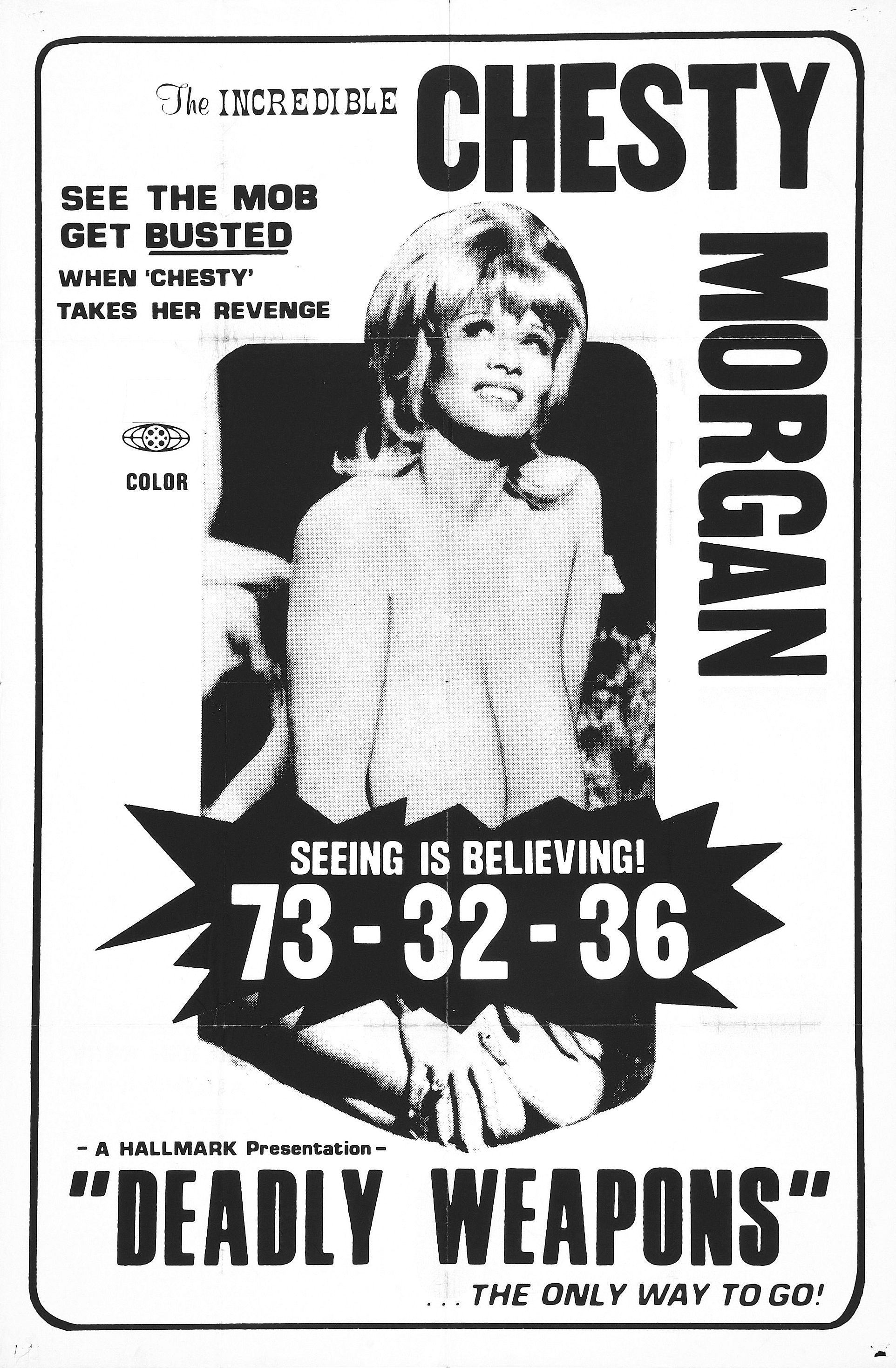
- Film poster
- Directed by: Doris Wishman
- Written by: “J.J. Kendall” (Judith Kushner)
- Produced by: Doris Wishman
- Starring: Zsa Zsa (Chesty Morgan); Harry Reemes
- Cinematography: Juan Fernández; C. Davis Smith
- Edited by: Lou Burdi
- Distributed by: Hallmark Releasing
- Release date: April 1974
- Running time: 75 minutes
- Country: United States
- Language: English

Deadly Weapons is a 1974 American exploitation film directed and produced by Doris Wishman. It stars burlesque performer Chesty Morgan and porn star Harry Reems.

== Plot ==
Crystal is an advertising executive who tracks down the mobsters who killed her boyfriend. One by one, she seduces each man, drugs them, then smothers them with her huge breasts. At the end, she finds out that her own father was implicated in her lover's death before being fatally shot in the chest by her father and turning her own gun on her father, killing him.

== In popular culture ==
A clip from the film is featured in John Waters's Serial Mom. In 1986, Waters told David Letterman about visiting the White House at the invitation of the Deputy Advisor of Political Affairs and was delighted to find they shared an appreciation of the film.

== Sequel ==
Double Agent 73, also directed by Wishman, is an ostensible sequel to Deadly Weapons.

== Cast ==
- Zsa Zsa as Crystal
- Harry Reemes as Tony
- Greg Reynolds as Larry
- Saul Meth as Nick / Talent agent
- Phillip Stahl as Crystal's father
- Mitchell Fredericks as Captain Hook
- Denise Purcell as Eve
- John McMohon

== Sources ==
- Thompson, Nathaniel (2006) [2002]. DVD Delirium: The International Guide to Weird and Wonderful Films on DVD; Volume 1 Redux. Godalming, England: FAB Press. pp. 195–196. ISBN 1-903254-39-6.

== See also ==
- List of American films of 1974
