= Linda Lovelace =

American pornographic actress turned anti-porn activist (1949–2002)

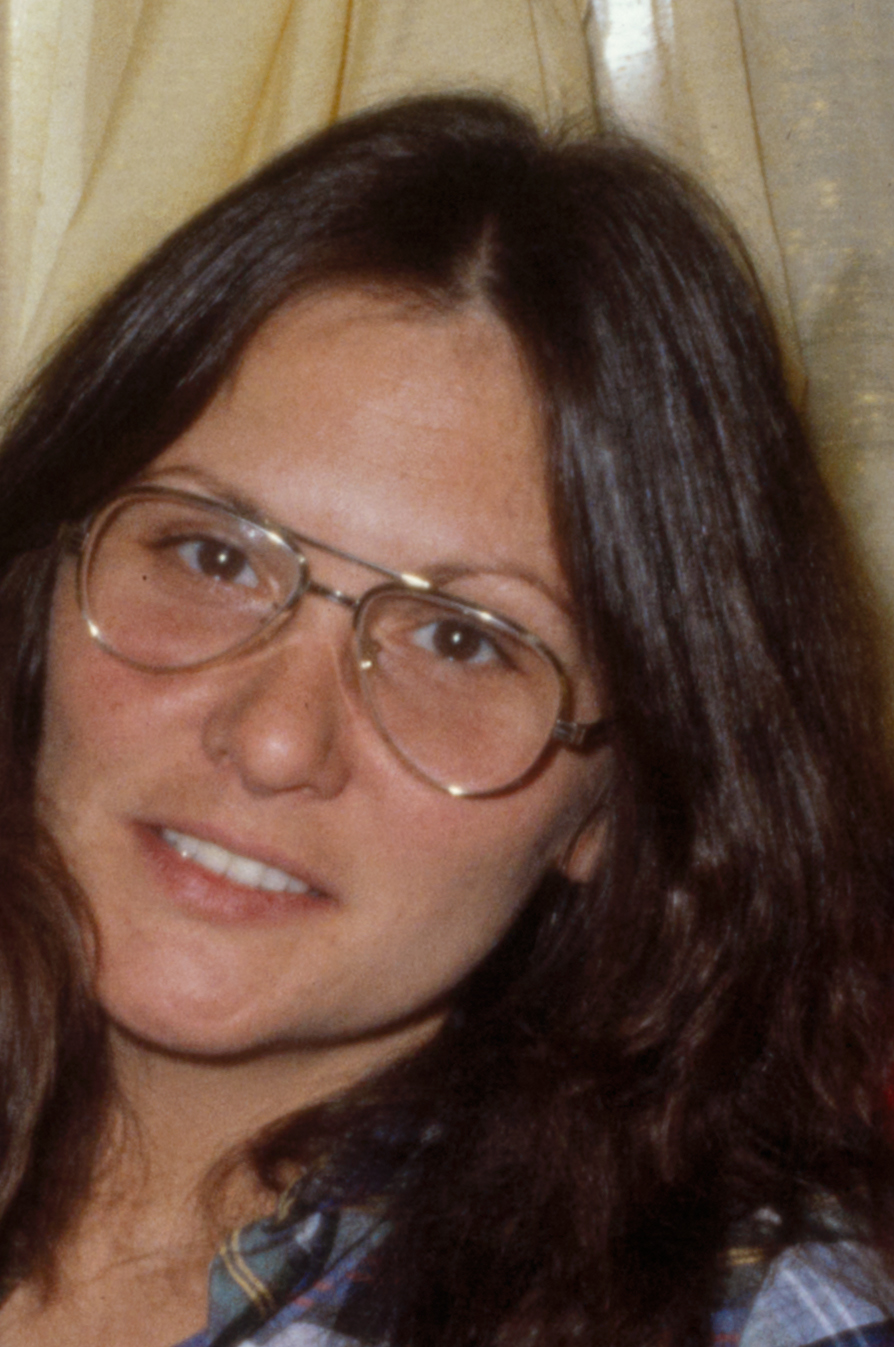
- Lovelace in 1986
- Born: Linda Susan Boreman; January 10, 1949; New York City, U.S.
- Died: April 22, 2002 (aged 53); Denver, Colorado, U.S.
- Occupations: Pornographic actress; memoirist
- Spouses: Chuck Traynor (m. 1971; div. 1975); Larry Marchiano (m. 1976; div. 1996)
- Children: 3

Linda Lovelace (born Linda Susan Boreman; January 10, 1949 – April 22, 2002) was an American actress who became famous for her performance in the 1972 hardcore film Deep Throat. She later accused Chuck Traynor, her husband at the time of the making of Deep Throat, of coercing her into participating in the film, allegations she detailed In her autobiography Ordeal (1980). She later became a born-again Christian and a spokeswoman for the feminist anti-pornography movement. By 2001, she had distanced herself from anti porn activists, stating in interviews that she had felt used for political purposes and received little financial support, and revealed she had since moderated her views on pornography.

== Early life ==
Boreman was born on January 10, 1949, in The Bronx, New York, into a working-class family. She described her upbringing in an unhappy family, as the daughter of John Boreman, a police officer who was seldom home, and Dorothy Boreman (née Tragney), a waitress who was harsh, unloving, and domineering. She attended private Catholic schools, including Saint John the Baptist (Yonkers, New York) and Maria Regina High School. Linda was nicknamed "Miss Holy Holy" in high school because she kept her dates at a safe distance to avoid sexual activity. When Boreman was 16, her family moved to Davie, Florida, after her father retired from the New York City Police Department.

At the age of 20, she gave birth to her first child born out of wedlock, whom her mother tricked her into putting up for adoption. Shortly afterwards, she returned to New York City to live and go to computer school. There, she was in a car crash, sustaining injuries that were serious enough to require her to undergo a blood transfusion. The transfused blood had not been properly screened for hepatitis contamination, which caused her to need a liver transplant 18 years later.

== Career ==
=== Pornography ===
While recovering at the home of her parents, Boreman met and became involved with Chuck Traynor. According to Boreman, Traynor was charming and attentive at first, then became violent and abusive. She said he forced her to move to New York, where he became her manager, pimp, and husband.

Allegedly coerced by Traynor, Boreman was soon performing as Linda Lovelace in hardcore "loops", short 8 mm silent films made for peep shows.

Boreman starred in a 1969 bestiality film titled Dogarama (also known as Dog 1, Dog Fucker and Dog-a-Rama). She later denied having appeared in the film until several of the original loops proved otherwise. In 2013, Larry Revene, the cameraman who actually shot the film, spoke about it for the first time, during which he asserted that Boreman was a willing participant and that no coercion took place. Porn star Eric Edwards, who was present for the shoot, has similarly claimed there was no obvious coercion going on and that Boreman appeared to be a cooperative performer.

In 1971, Boreman also starred in the golden shower film titled Piss Orgy.

In 1972, Boreman starred in Deep Throat, in which she performed deep-throating. The film achieved surprising and unprecedented popularity among mainstream audiences and even a review in the New York Times. It played several times daily for over ten years at theaters in the Pussycat Theater chain, where Boreman did promotions, including leaving her hand and footprints in the concrete sidewalk outside the Hollywood Pussycat. The movie later became one of the first, and highest-grossing, X-rated videotape releases. While Deep Throat grossed over $600 million, Boreman was paid only $1,250, which was later confiscated by her husband Traynor.

On December 20, 1973, she was inducted into the Golden Age of Porn Walk of Fame.

=== Media career after Deep Throat ===
In December 1973, Boreman made her theater debut in Pajama Tops at the Locust Theatre in Philadelphia, Pennsylvania. The production suffered disappointing box office performance, which led it to close early, and Boreman's performance was panned.

In 1974, Boreman starred in the R-rated sequel, Deep Throat II, which was not as well received as the original had been; one critic, writing in Variety, described it as "the shoddiest of exploitation film traditions, a depressing fast buck attempt to milk a naïve public." That same year, she published two "pro-porn" autobiographies, Inside Linda Lovelace and The Intimate Diary of Linda Lovelace. She also posed for Playboy, Bachelor, and Esquire between 1973 and 1974.

In 1975, Boreman left Traynor for David Winters, the producer of her 1975 film Linda Lovelace for President, which co-starred Micky Dolenz. The film showed her on the campaign trail following a cross-country bus route mapped out in the shape of a penis. However, her career as an actress failed to flourish, and her film appearances add up to five hours of screen time. In her 1980 autobiography Ordeal, Lovelace maintained that those films used leftover footage from Deep Throat; however, she frequently contradicted this statement.

During the mid-1970s, she took to smoking large quantities of marijuana combined with painkillers, and after her second marriage and the birth of her two children, she left the pornographic film business.

In 1976, she was chosen to play the title role in the erotic movie Forever Emmanuelle (also known as Laure). However, according to the producer Ovidio G. Assonitis, Lovelace was "very much on drugs" at the time. She had already signed for the part when she avowed that "God had changed [her] life", refused to do any nudity, and even objected to a statue of the Venus de Milo on the set because of its exposed breasts. She was replaced by French actress Annie Belle.

In January 1977, she briefly returned to theater acting in a Las Vegas production of My Daughter's Rated X, but the show closed early and her acting performance was criticized.

== Charges against Chuck Traynor ==
In her suit to divorce Traynor, she alleged that he forced her into pornography at gunpoint and that in Deep Throat bruises from his beatings can be seen on her legs. She alleged that her husband "would force her to do these things by pointing a rifle at her head." Boreman said in her autobiography that her marriage had been plagued by violence, rape, forced prostitution and private pornography. She wrote in Ordeal:

When in response to his suggestions I let him know I would not become involved in prostitution in any way and told him I intended to leave, [Traynor] beat me and the constant mental abuse began. I literally became a prisoner, I was not allowed out of his sight, not even to use the bathroom, where he watched me through a hole in the door. He slept on top of me at night, he listened to my telephone calls with a .45 automatic eight shot pointed at me. I suffered mental abuse each and every day thereafter. He undermined my ties with other people and forced me to marry him on advice from his lawyer. My initiation into prostitution was a gang rape by five men, arranged by Mr. Traynor. It was the turning point in my life. He threatened to shoot me with the pistol if I didn't go through with it. I had never experienced anal sex before and it ripped me apart. They treated me like an inflatable plastic doll, picking me up and moving me here and there. They spread my legs this way and that, shoving their things at me and into me, they were playing musical chairs with parts of my body. I have never been so frightened and disgraced and humiliated in my life. I felt like garbage. I engaged in sex acts in pornography against my will to avoid being killed ... The lives of my family were threatened.

Boreman's accusations provoked mixed responses. Traynor admitted to striking Lovelace but said it was part of a voluntary sex game. In Legs McNeil's and Jennifer Osborne's 2005 book The Other Hollywood, several witnesses, including Deep Throat director Gerard Damiano, state that Traynor beat Boreman behind closed doors, but they also question her credibility. Eric Edwards, Boreman's co-star in the bestiality films and other loops that featured her urinating on her sex partners, similarly discounts her credibility. According to Edwards, Boreman was a sexual "super freak" who had no boundaries and was a pathological liar. Adult film actress Gloria Leonard was quoted as saying, "This was a woman who never took responsibility for her own ... choices made; but instead blamed everything that happened to her in her life on porn." Corroboration for Lovelace's claims came from Andrea True, Lovelace's co-star in Deep Throat 2, who, on a commentary DVD track of the documentary Inside Deep Throat, stated that Traynor was a sadist and was disliked by the Deep Throat 2 cast. Andrea Dworkin stated that the results of polygraph tests administered to Boreman support her assertions. Moreover, psychiatrist Judith Lewis Herman notes that many details in Lovelace's memoir Ordeal are consistent with a diagnosis of complex PTSD, such as Lovelace's description of a fragmented personality in the aftermath of alleged abuse.

Eric Danville, a journalist who covered the porn industry for nearly 20 years and wrote The Complete Linda Lovelace in 2001, said Boreman never changed her version of events that had occurred 30 years earlier with Traynor. When Danville told Boreman of his book proposal, he said she was overcome with emotion and saddened he had uncovered the bestiality film, which she had initially denied making and later maintained she had been forced to star in at gunpoint.

Boreman maintained that she received no money for Deep Throat and that the $1,250 payment for her appearance was taken by Traynor.

== Marriage with Marchiano ==
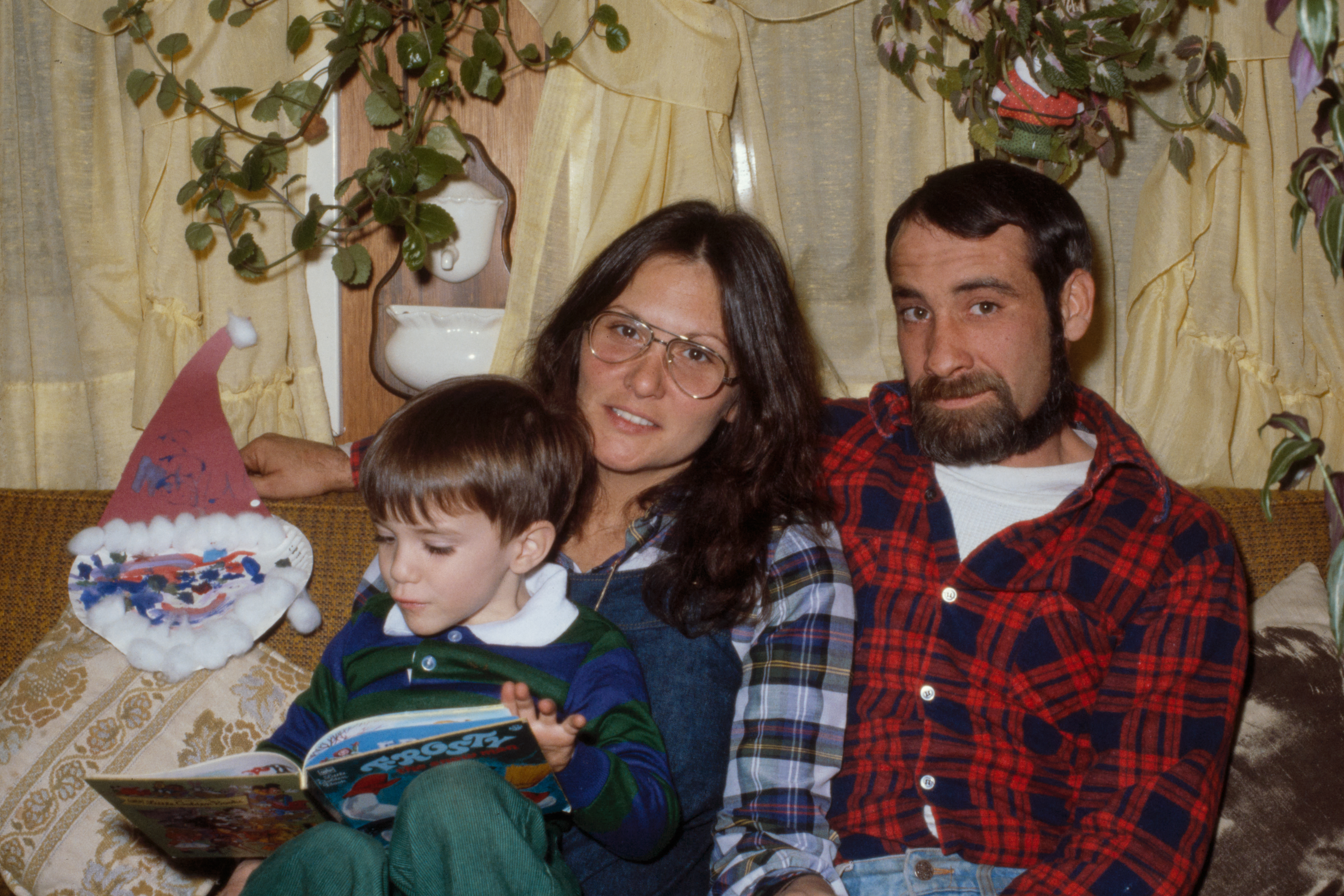
Linda Lovelace and Larry Marchiano in 1986

In 1976, Boreman married Larry Marchiano, a cable installer who later owned a drywall business. They had two children. They lived in Center Moriches, a small town on Long Island. Boreman was then going through the liver transplant that her injuries from the automobile accident had necessitated, owing to the poorly screened blood she received in the transfusions. For a while, marriage and particularly motherhood brought her some stability and happiness. However, Marchiano's business went bankrupt in 1990, and the family moved to Colorado.

In The Other Hollywood, Boreman painted a largely unflattering picture of Marchiano, claiming he drank to excess, verbally abused their children, and was occasionally violent with her. They divorced in 1996 but remained on good terms and were in contact until the end of her life.

== Anti-pornography activism ==
With the publication of Ordeal in 1980, Boreman joined the anti-pornography movement. At a press conference announcing Ordeal, she leveled many of the above-noted accusations against Traynor in public for the first time. She was joined by supporters Andrea Dworkin, Catharine MacKinnon, Gloria Steinem, and members of Women Against Pornography. Boreman spoke out against pornography, stating that she had been abused and coerced. She spoke before feminist groups, at colleges, and at government hearings on pornography.

In 1986, Boreman published Out of Bondage, a memoir focusing on her life after 1974. She testified before the 1986 Attorney General's Commission on Pornography, also called the "Meese Commission", in New York City, stating, "When you see the movie Deep Throat, you are watching me being raped. It is a crime that movie is still showing; there was a gun to my head the entire time." Following Boreman's testimony for the Meese Commission, she gave lectures on college campuses, decrying what she described as callous and exploitative practices in the pornography industry.

== Last years and death ==
Boreman had contracted hepatitis from the blood transfusion she received after her 1970 car wreck and underwent a liver transplant in 1987. In 2001, she was featured on E! True Hollywood Story and did a lingerie pictorial as Linda Lovelace for the magazine Leg Show.

In 2001, Boreman told interviewers that she felt exploited by feminist anti-pornography activists and had received little financial support from them. Facing financial difficulties, she made several paid appearances at adult industry conventions prior to her death, and revealed that while she still disliked pornography, she no longer believed in censorship and acknowledged that her own experience in the adult industry was not universal.

On April 3, 2002, Boreman was involved in another automobile wreck, suffering massive trauma and internal injuries. On April 22, she was taken off life support and died at the age of 53. Marchiano and their two children were present when she died. Boreman was interred at Parker Cemetery in Parker, Colorado.

== Legacy ==
The computer processing coordination system Linda was named after Linda Lovelace. This name choice was inspired by the programming language Ada, which was named after computer pioneer Ada Lovelace.

Boreman's participation in Deep Throat was among the topics explored in the 2005 documentary Inside Deep Throat.

Indie pop singer and songwriter Marc with a C released a 2008 album titled Linda Lovelace for President, which contained a song of the same name.

The country songwriter and singer David Allan Coe wrote a song called "Linda Lovelace" which is featured on his 1978 album Nothing Sacred. The same song appears on his 1990 album 18 X-Rated Hits under the title "I Made Linda Lovelace Gag".

In 2008, Lovelace: A Rock Musical, based on two of Boreman's four autobiographies, debuted at the Hayworth Theatre in Los Angeles. The score and libretto were written by Anna Waronker of the 1990s rock group That Dog, and Charlotte Caffey of the 1980s group the Go-Go's.

Lovelace is one of the main characters of the 2010 stage play The Deep Throat Sex Scandal by David Bertolino. The play follows the life and early career of Harry Reems as he enters the pornography industry, eventually filming Deep Throat and its resultant infamy and obscenity trial in Memphis, Tennessee, and Lovelace is a central figure. In July 2013, an Indiegogo crowdfunding campaign to make a film version of the play raised over $25,000.

As of 2011, two biographical films on Boreman were scheduled to begin production. One, titled Lovelace, went into general release on August 9, 2013, with Rob Epstein and Jeffrey Friedman directing, Amanda Seyfried as Lovelace, and Peter Sarsgaard as Chuck Traynor. Lovelace received a limited release in 2013, but ultimately, despite drawing many positive reviews, it was a box-office failure. The other, titled Inferno: A Linda Lovelace Story, starring Malin Åkerman, was to be directed by Matthew Wilder and produced by Chris Hanley and was scheduled to begin filming in early 2011. Due to a lack of financing it never went into production.

Tina Yothers, who was a child actress on Family Ties, was cast as Lovelace in Lovelace: The Musical.

== Filmography ==
- Dogarama (1969)
- Piss Orgy (1971)
- Deep Throat (1972)
- The Confessions of Linda Lovelace (1974)
- Deep Throat Part II (1974) as Nurse Lovelace
- Linda Lovelace for President (1975)

== Bibliography ==
- Lovelace, Linda (1973). Inside Linda Lovelace. Pinnacle Books. ISBN 978-0-902826-11-3.
- Lovelace, Linda; Wallin, Carl (1974). The Intimate Diary of Linda Lovelace. Pinnacle Books. ISBN 978-0-523-00394-8.
- Lovelace, Linda; McGrady, Mike (1980). Ordeal. Bell Publishing Company. ISBN 0-517-42791-5.
- Lovelace, Linda; McGrady, Mike (1986). Out of Bondage. Lyle Stuart. ISBN 0-425-10650-0.

Other books:

- Jack Stevenson (ed): Fleshpot: Cinema's Sexual Myth Makers & Taboo Breakers (Headpress, England 2000), features an interview with Lovelace.

== See also ==
- Women Against Pornography
- Ordeal (autobiography)
