= Theatre at the Center =

- Interactive map of Theatre at the Center
- Full name: The Center for the Visual and Performing Arts
- Address: 1040 Ridge Road
- Location: Munster, Indiana
- Coordinates: 41°33′35.5″N 87°30′11.4″W
- Type: Theatre

Construction
- Opened: 1991

Website
- www.theatreatthecenter.com

Theatre at the Center is a professional theatre in Munster, Indiana. Established in 1991, it operates year-round as Northwest Indiana's only equity professional theater. The theatre produces a mainstage performing arts series and a children's theatre program. It is operated by the Ridgewood Arts Foundation, a 501(c)(3) nonprofit organization, and is situated approximately 35 minutes from downtown Chicago.

== Mission ==
The mission of Ridgewood Arts Foundation, Inc.’s Theatre at the Center is to "bring to The Center for Visual and Performing Arts, disciplines of the performing arts that are at once appealing, educational, and accessible to the entire community."

Theatre at the Center's main stage season offers five productions annually. More than forty of the theater's productions have been nominated for Jeff Awards, which are regional awards celebrating excellence in Chicago theatre.

Additionally, Theatre at the Center offers Theatre for Young Audiences programming, presenting four productions annually.

== Artistic Director ==
William Pullinsi was the founder and artistic director of Candlelight Playhouse, America's first dinner theatre which opened in Washington, D.C. in 1959 and Summit, Illinois in 1961. He has been credited with introducing theatre to a wider audience of patrons. Pullinsi has directed numerous American musicals and received recognition from theatre organizations for his work.

Pullinsi served as the artistic director at Theatre at the Center since 2005. He has directed and produced more than 400 shows in his career, receiving 18 Jeff Awards. Pullinsi produced numerous shows that went on to have record-breaking multi-year runs including Fiddler on the Roof, Man of La Mancha, and Little Shop of Horrors, the latter of which transferred to the Royal George Theatre.

Pullinsi made several acquisitions for the theatre, including the Broadway set of Company from Hal Prince, the off Broadway plants for Little Shop of Horrors, and the Tony Award-winning costumes from Nine. He also opened the Forum Theatre in 1970 to present deeper and more thought-provoking theatre including The National Health, Robert and Elizabeth, and the world premiere of Boss. Additionally, at Candlelight Playhouse, he staged well-received productions of musicals that were historically commercial failures, such as Follies, Song & Dance, and Rags.

Shows for which he received both Best Production and Best Direction awards include: Follies, Into the Woods, Phantom, Little Shop of Horrors, Nine, The National Health, and Man of La Mancha. He directed Into the Woods at Marriott's Lincolnshire Theatre and the long running play, Over the Tavern at Northlight Theatre and the Mercury Theatre. He served as associate producer of Trying, a new play Off-Broadway in New York.

Pullinsi received his B.F.A. from Boston Conservatory, and did graduate work at the Goodman School. He received an honorary Doctorate of Humanities from Lewis University. He was named a distinguished artist in the theatre by the Chicago Academy of Arts and the Chicago Drama League.The Chicago Tribune named him the Chicagoan of the Year in Theater in 2015 when he retired from his theatrical career.

In 1989, Pullinsi became the first American director to stage a musical in Russia with a Soviet cast and crew. He directed Man of La Mancha during a five-week visit to the Drama Theatre of Turgenev in Orel, south of Moscow. Pullinsi was a lifelong member of the Actors' Equity Association and a member of the Society of Stage Directors and Choreographers.

== General Manager ==
In 2011, Theatre at the Center announced the appointment of Richard Friedman as general manager.

Friedman had served as managing director of Northlight Theatre for nine years. During that time, the theatre established their first permanent home at the North Shore Center for the Performing Arts, boosting subscriptions from 3,000 to 9,000 patrons. Under Friedman's management, the budget grew from $800,000 to $2.9 million. He has produced commercial shows including Always...Patsy Cline at the Apollo Theater Chicago, The Guys at the Lakeshore Theater featuring Jeremy Piven, Joan Cusack, and Daniel J. Travanti and Jim Post's Heart of Christmas also at the Lakeshore Theatre.

Friedman has consulted on performing arts management with companies including Deeply Rooted Dance Theatre and Mordine and Company Dance. He served as the executive director of Arts Resources and Teaching (A.R.T.), as well as the managing director of Organic Theater Company. During his time with Organic, he oversaw the renovation of the building on Clark Street. He produced shows like the revival of Bleacher Bums, directed by Joe Mantegna and Do The White Thing with Aaron Freeman and Rob Kolson.

Friedman was a founder of the Illinois Arts Alliance, chairing its first statewide conference on advocacy for the arts. He is a former member of the League of Chicago Theatres and currently serves as secretary of the board of CAN-TV, Chicago's public access cable television organization. Friedman is a co-founder and former director of Yellow Press, a literary publisher, and the author of two books of poetry. Additionally, Friedman is a recipient of the Illinois Theatre Association's Annual Award of Excellence for his work at Northlight Theatre. Friedman is a graduate of the University of Illinois at Chicago.

== Recent performances ==
Year	Mainstage	Theatre for Young Audiences	Special Events
2016	The 39 Steps; Nice Work If You Can Get It; The Odd Couple; Pump Boys and Dinettes; Annie Warbucks	Freedom Train; The Wizard of Oz; Jack and the Beanstalk; The Story of the Nutcracker	The Signal; Switchback; Dennis Watkins; Purdue Varsity Glee Club; WGN Comedians; Tom Dreesen; American English; Harbor Lights; Echoes of Pompeii
2015	On Golden Pond; Big Fish; All Shook Up; Monty Python's Spamalot; A Christmas Story	I Have A Dream; Peter Pan and the Pirates; Alice in Wonderland; Santa's Magic Toyshop	Purdue Varsity Glee Club; Tom Dreesen; Harbor Lights; M&R Rush; Switchback; The Neverly Brothers; A Jersey Voice
