= Inside Deep Throat =

- Theatrical release poster
- Directed by: Fenton Bailey; Randy Barbato
- Written by: Fenton Bailey; Randy Barbato
- Produced by: Fenton Bailey; Randy Barbato; Brian Grazer; Uncredited: Ron Howard
- Narrated by: Dennis Hopper
- Cinematography: David Kempner; Teodoro Maniaci
- Edited by: William Grayburn; Jeremy Simmons
- Music by: David Benjamin Steinberg
- Production companies: Imagine Entertainment; HBO Documentary Films; World of Wonder
- Distributed by: Universal Pictures (United States); Summit Entertainment (International)
- Release dates: January 2005 (Sundance); February 11, 2005
- Running time: 89 minutes
- Country: United States
- Language: English
- Budget: $2 million
- Box office: $709,832

Inside Deep Throat is a 2005 American documentary film about the 1972 pornographic film Deep Throat, at the forefront of the Golden Age of Porn, and its effects on American society.

== Content ==
The film discusses how Deep Throat was distributed to theaters when prints would be hand-delivered and employees would count heads of moviegoers and then collect the cash profits from the theaters. This process was known as sending "checkers and sweepers".

It features scenes from the film, news of the time and interviews, both from archive and recent footage, with director Gerard Damiano, actor Harry Reems, actress Linda Lovelace, Gore Vidal, Larry Flynt, Hugh Hefner, John Waters, Erica Jong, a prosecutor, Reems' defense attorney, Mafia money collectors, and other people involved or just commenting on the film. Much of the material was compiled from approximately 800 hours of interview and archive footage collected by the filmmakers.

== Contributions ==
Narrator

- Dennis Hopper

Interviewees

- John Waters
- Hugh Hefner
- Larry Flynt
- Annie Sprinkle
- Gore Vidal
- Gerard Damiano
- Dick Cavett
- Wes Craven
- Bill Maher
- Harry Reems
- David Winters
- Norman Mailer
- Erica Jong
- Catharine MacKinnon
- Camille Paglia
- Tony Bill
- Ruth Westheimer (Dr. Ruth)

Archive footage

- Linda Lovelace
- Francis Ford Coppola
- Warren Beatty
- Johnny Carson
- Bob Hope
- Jack Nicholson
- Gloria Steinem
- New York City Mayor John Lindsay

== Production ==
Narrated by Dennis Hopper, the documentary was written, produced, and directed by Fenton Bailey and Randy Barbato, and produced by Brian Grazer. It is a production of Imagine Entertainment, HBO Documentary Films, and World of Wonder, and distributed by Universal Pictures.

== Rating ==
Inside Deep Throat was rated NC-17 by the Motion Picture Association of America for explicit sexual content; specifically, explicit excerpts from the original film. It was the first film rated NC-17 to be released by Universal since Henry & June in 1990, which was the first film to receive the NC-17 rating.

An edited version received an R rating for "strong sexuality including graphic images, nudity and dialogue".
