= Deep Throat (film) =

1972 pornographic film by Gerard Damiano

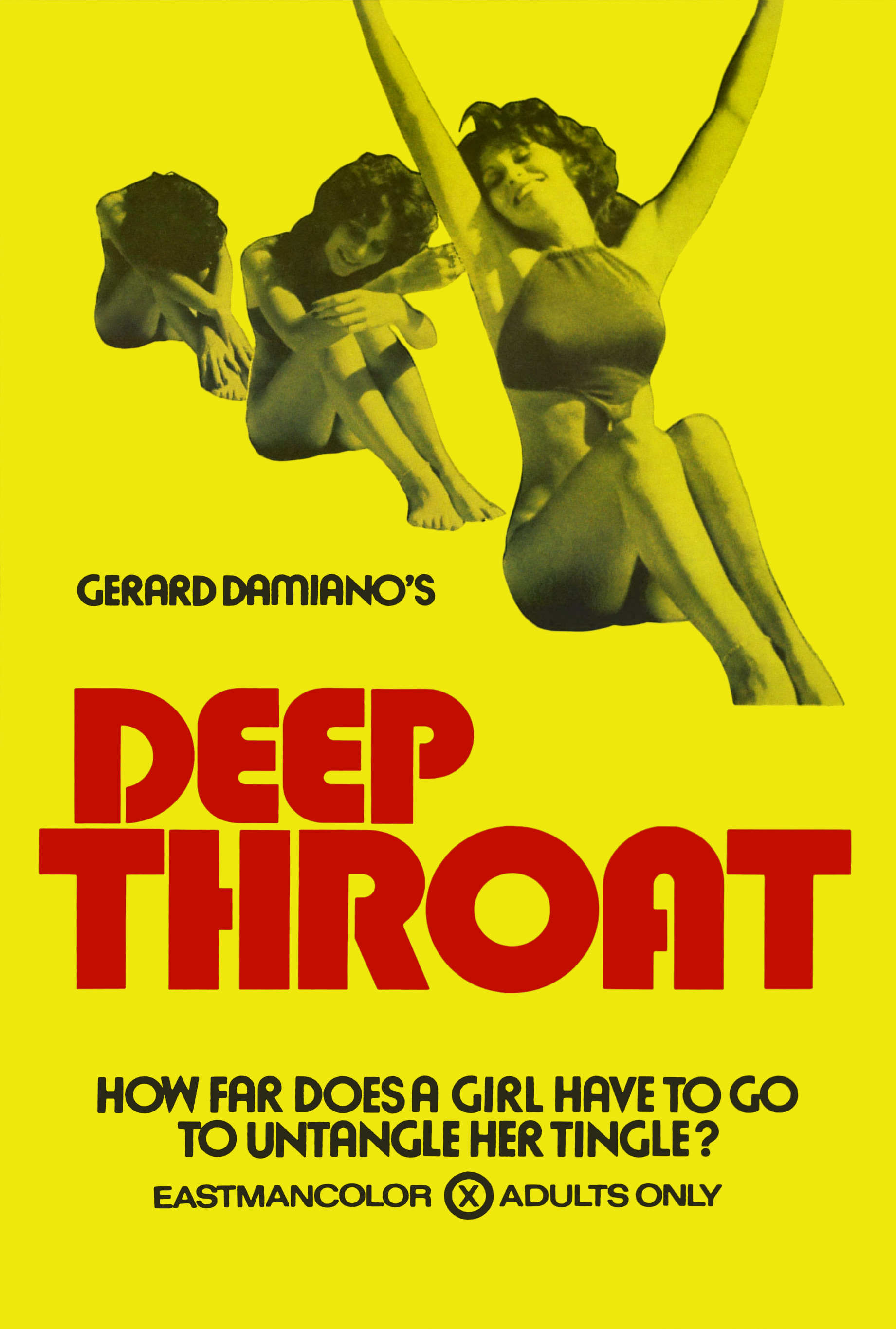
- Theatrical release poster
- Directed by: Jerry Gerard
- Written by: Jerry Gerard
- Produced by: Louis "Butchie" Peraino
- Starring: Linda Lovelace; Harry Reems; Dolly Sharp; Carol Connors
- Cinematography: Harry Flecks
- Edited by: Jerry Gerard
- Distributed by: Bryanston Distributing Company
- Release date: June 12, 1972
- Running time: 62 minutes
- Country: United States
- Language: English
- Budget: $47,500
- Box office: $30–50 million

Deep Throat is a 1972 American pornographic film written and directed by Gerard Damiano, listed in the credits as "Jerry Gerard", and starring Linda Lovelace (Linda Susan Boreman). It is considered the forefront of the Golden Age of Porn (1969–1984).

One of the first pornographic films to feature a plot, character development, and relatively high production values, Deep Throat earned mainstream attention and launched the "porno chic" trend, although the film was the subject of obscenity trials and banned in some jurisdictions. Lovelace later claimed that she was coerced and sexually assaulted during the production, and that the film is genuine rape pornography.

== Plot ==
Linda Lovelace, a sexually frustrated woman, seeks advice from her friend Helen on how to achieve an orgasm. After attending a sex party that proves unhelpful, Helen suggests that Linda visit a psychiatrist named Dr. Young. During their sessions, the doctor discovers that Linda's clitoris is located in her throat, instead of its normal location. Because stimulation of the clitoris is usually required for a woman to achieve orgasm, Linda would need to develop an oral sex technique that would stimulate her unusually located clitoris.

Dr. Young assists Linda in developing this technique. During this process, Linda becomes infatuated with Dr. Young and proposes marriage. Dr. Young responds that Linda should instead become his therapist, utilizing her particular oral technique—henceforth known as "deep-throating"—on various men until she finds a suitable husband. Simultaneously, the doctor documents her exploits in repeated sexual encounters with his nurse. Eventually, Linda meets a man who brings her happiness and sexual fulfilment, and she agrees to marry him. The movie concludes with the line, "The End. And Deep Throat to you all."

== Cast ==
- Linda Lovelace as Herself
- Harry Reems as Dr. Young
- Dolly Sharp as Helen
- Bill Harrison as Mr. Maltz
- William Love as Wilber Wang
- Carol Connors as the nurse
- Bob Phillips as Mr. Fenster
- Ted Street as Delivery Boy
- John Byron as #11
- Jack Birch (billed as "Michael Powers") as #12
- Gerard Damiano (billed as "Al Gork") as Last Man
- Ron Wertheim (unbilled) as Bearded Man On Sofa

== Production ==
The scenes involving Lovelace were shot in North Miami, Florida over six days in January 1972. The interior scenes were shot at a hotel between 123rd and 124th Streets on Biscayne Boulevard, then known as the Voyager Inn. The scenes involving Carol Connors were shot in New York City.

The movie was produced by Louis "Butchie" Peraino, who was listed in the credits as "Lou Perry". Peraino was the owner of Plymouth Distributing, which he later renamed Arrow Film and Video. The entire production cost of $22,500 (equivalent to $173,000 today), and an additional $25,000 ($192,000 today) for music, was provided by Peraino's father, Anthony Peraino, a member of the Colombo crime family. Gerard Damiano, who had rights to one-third of the profits, was reportedly paid a lump sum of $25,000 once the film became popular and was forced out of the partnership. John Franzese also had a financial stake in the film.

== Reception ==
In a March 1973 column, critic Roger Ebert wrote: "It is all very well and good for Linda Lovelace, the star of the movie, to advocate sexual freedom; but the energy she brings to her role is less awesome than discouraging. If you have to work this hard at sexual freedom, maybe it isn't worth the effort." A review in Variety stated that although the film "doesn't quite live up to its reputation as the Ben-Hur of porno pix, it is a superior piece which stands a head above the competition." Al Goldstein wrote a rave review in his Screw magazine, saying "I was never so moved by any theatrical performance since stuttering through my own bar mitzvah."

=== Porno chic and pop culture influence ===
Deep Throat officially premiered at the World Theater in New York on June 12, 1972, and was advertised in The New York Times under the bowdlerized title Throat.

The film's popularity helped launch a brief period of upper-middle class interest in explicit pornography referred to by Ralph Blumenthal of The New York Times as "porno chic". Several mainstream celebrities admitted to having seen Deep Throat, including Martin Scorsese, Brian De Palma, Truman Capote, Jack Nicholson, Johnny Carson, Spiro Agnew, Frank Sinatra, Philip Dresmann and Louis Derfert. Barbara Walters mentions having seen the film in her autobiography, Audition: A Memoir. Jimmy McMillan considers it to be his favorite film.

The film's title soon became a pop culture reference, most notably when Howard Simons, the then-managing editor of The Washington Post, chose it as the code name for assistant FBI director W. Mark Felt, a well-guarded secret inside informant during the Watergate scandal that plagued the administration of President Richard M. Nixon.

== Revenue ==
Deep Throat grossed $1 million (equivalent to $7.7 million today) in its first seven weeks of release in 1972, including a then-porn film single-screen record of $30,033 ($231,161 today) in its opening week at New York City's World Theatre. The film made a then-record $3 million ($23.1 million today) in its first six months of release and was still ranked among the top 10 highest-grossing films, as ranked by Variety, 48 weeks after its release.

Estimates of the film's total revenues have varied widely: numbers as high as $600 million (equivalent to $4.6 billion today) have been cited, which would make Deep Throat one of the highest-grossing films of all time. With an average ticket price of $5 ($38.48 today), box-office takings of $600 million would imply 120 million admissions, an unrealistic figure. Although subsequent sales of the film on home video certainly brought additional revenue, the FBI's estimate that the film produced an income of approximately $100 million ($770 million today) may be closer to the truth. Michael Hiltzik of the Los Angeles Times also argues for a lower figure in a February 2005 article, pointing out that Deep Throat was banned outright in large parts of the US (as well as many other countries), and only tended to find screenings in a small network of adult theaters in larger urban centers. The directors of Inside Deep Throat, a 2005 documentary about the film's cultural legacy, responded to the article, suggesting that actual revenues from the film were possibly even higher than the $600 million figure. Hiltzik was unsatisfied with the directors' response, writing that their method was to "construct a seemingly solid box office figure out of layers and layers of speculation piled upon a foundation of sand".

Roger Ebert noted in his review of Inside Deep Throat that many theaters that screened the film were mob-connected enterprises, which probably also "inflated box office receipts as a way of laundering income from drugs and prostitution" and other illegal activities.

In 2006, a censored edition of the film was released on DVD for fans of pop culture and those wishing to own a non-X-rated copy of the infamous movie. Deep Throat was the first film to be inducted into the XRCO Hall of Fame.

== Controversies ==
=== Linda Boreman's allegations ===
In her first two biographies, Linda Boreman characterized having made the film as a liberating experience; in her third and fourth biographies, both of which were written after she had come out with her stories of sexual abuse, rape, and forced prostitution in the porn business, she charged that she had not consented to many of the depicted sexual acts and that she had been coerced to perform by her abusive then-husband Chuck Traynor, who received $1,250 (equivalent to $10,000 today) for her acting. She also claimed that Traynor threatened to kill her, brandishing handguns and rifles to control her.

In 1986, she testified before the Meese Commission, "Virtually every time someone watches that movie, they're watching me being raped." In the Toronto Sun on March 20, 1981, she said, "It is a crime that movie is still showing; there was a gun to my head the entire time." While the other people present on the set did not support the gun charge, both Traynor and Damiano confirmed in interviews that Traynor was extremely controlling towards Boreman and also hit her on occasion. In the documentary Inside Deep Throat, it is claimed that bruises are visible on Boreman's body in the movie.

These allegations were cited in the UK Government's Rapid Evidence Assessment on "the evidence of harm to adults relating to exposure to extreme pornographic material" as part of its plans to criminalize possession of what it termed "extreme pornography".

=== Obscenity litigation ===
In various United States communities, the movie was shown to juries to determine whether it was obscene; the outcomes varied widely and the movie was banned in numerous locations.

In August 1972, after a jury in New York City had found the movie not to be obscene, prosecutors decided to charge Mature Enterprises, the company that owned the World Theater, for promotion of obscene material, taking them to trial in December. During the trial, a psychiatrist testified that the film portrayed acts that were "well within the bounds of normal behavior". A film critic testified the movie had social value because it showed sympathy for female desires, because the script contained humor and because it was filmed "with clarity and lack of grain". Conversely, in response to a claim the film was a spoof of sexual behavior, a New York University professor said, "I do not see how you can spoof fellatio by showing continuous performance of fellatio." On March 1, 1973, Judge Joel J. Tyler ruled Deep Throat to be obscene, issuing his opinion on the film as "this feast of carrion and squalor", "a nadir of decadence" and "a Sodom and Gomorrah gone wild before the fire". Judge Tyler fined Mature Enterprises $100,000 (equivalent to $730,000 today), which was later reduced on appeal. The ruling inadvertently contributed to the film's becoming perhaps the most popular X-rated movie of all time.

In 1976, there was a series of federal cases in Memphis, Tennessee, where over 60 individuals and companies, including the Perainos and actor Harry Reems, were indicted for conspiracy to distribute obscenity across state lines. Damiano and Lovelace were granted immunity in exchange for testimony. Federal District Court judge Harry W. Wellford heard the case, and the trial ended with a conviction. This was the first time that an actor had been prosecuted by the federal government on obscenity charges. (Lenny Bruce had been prosecuted in the 1960s by local authorities.) Reems became a cause célèbre and received considerable support from Hollywood circles. On appeal, he was represented by Alan Dershowitz, and his conviction was overturned: the Miller test (the three-pronged standard from the U.S. Supreme Court's 1973 decision in Miller v. California that determines what constitutes obscenity) was applied in his case. The Federal Bureau of Investigation case known as "Miporn" convicted and sentenced, on April 30, 1977, Michael Cherubino to five months' imprisonment and a fine of $4,000, Anthony Novello to six months' imprisonment, Joseph Peraino to one year's imprisonment and a fine of $10,000 (including a $10,000 fine to his company, Plymouth Distributors Inc.), Louis Peraino to one year's imprisonment and a fine of $10,000 (including a $10,000 fine to each of his two companies, Bryanston Distributors Inc. and Gerard Damiano Productions Inc.), Anthony Battista to four months' imprisonment and a fine of $4,000, Carl Carter to six months' imprisonment and a fine of $6,500, Mel Friedman to nine months' imprisonment and a fine of $7,500, and Mario Desalvo to three months' imprisonment and a fine of $3,500.

In 1975, a Sioux Falls, South Dakota jury found the film not obscene.

In San Antonio, police seized the movie and its movie projector from a theater several times in the space of two weeks.

Herman Hausman, manager of Franklin Art Theater on South Avenue, Syracuse, New York, was charged with second degree obscenity.

In the UK, the movie was banned upon release, and the ban was upheld by the courts 10 years later. The uncut DVD and VHS Video of the movie was finally given an R18 rating in 2000, which allowed it to be sold in licensed sex shops in the UK.

=== Copyright ===
Deep Throat was released without a copyright notice. Because Peraino had used four wall distribution for all of Deep Throat's releases, that left the potential for the film to be classified as an unpublished work, preventing it from falling into the public domain. Peraino sold the rights to the film to Arrow Productions for home video release (including a copyright notice) at some point prior to 2009. Despite Arrow holding the rights, rival pornography distributor VCX began distributing Deep Throat as retaliation for Arrow's distribution of Debbie Does Dallas and The Devil in Miss Jones, two films VCX asserted were under their copyright. (In the former case, Debbie Does Dallas was determined to be public domain in a 1987 court ruling.) In order to prevent VCX from challenging the copyright on Deep Throat, Arrow Productions agreed in 2011 to voluntarily stop distributing Debbie Does Dallas and The Devil in Miss Jones, thus leaving their copyright status unresolved.

=== Broadcasting ===
In April 1978, pirate station Lucky 7 in Syracuse, New York illegally aired Deep Throat (and also Behind the Green Door, as well as non-pornographic fare such as episodes of Star Trek). The pirates have never been identified.

On February 23, 2008, the Netherlands Public Broadcasting corporations VPRO and BNN screened Deep Throat on national television as part of a themed night on the history of pornographic films, and the influence of pornography in youth culture in the Netherlands. Although the film aired after 10 p.m., following a guideline for adult television, and was embedded in a discussion program, several political parties (especially Dutch cabinet member party Christian Union) were clamoring for steps to be taken to prevent airing. The Minister of Education and Media, Ronald Plasterk, declared that he could not and did not want to forbid the airing of the film. The movie was seen by 907,000 viewers.

=== Identity of "Dolly Sharp" ===
In December 2014, The Rialto Report, a web site devoted to the history of the so-called Golden Age of Porn, made the surprise announcement that the supporting actress billed as Dolly Sharp, who had vanished into obscurity shortly after the release of Deep Throat, was in fact Helen Wood (1935–1998), a former Broadway performer who, as a teenager, had a major role in the 1953 Hollywood musical Give a Girl a Break.

== Soundtrack ==
Deep Throat

Soundtrack album by unknown artists
- Released: 1972
- Recorded: 1972
- Genre: Film soundtrack
- Length: 60 minutes
- Producer: Louis Peraino

An original soundtrack album for the film was released in 1972. Few copies remain and when on the market, they have sold for as much as US$300. The album contains both instrumental and vocals tracks as well as short snippets of dialog from the film (indicated with quotations in the list below). All artists are unknown. A remixed and remastered CD and LP version is available from Light in the Attic Records (see links). Director Gerard Damiano reportedly edited the sex scenes to conform to different musical cues. The film opens with an instrumental track that echoes the hook of the 1968 easy listening hit, "Do You Know the Way to San Jose".

- Introducing Linda Lovelace
- "Mind if I smoke while you're eating?"
- Blowing' Bubbles
- "A Lot of little tingles"
- Love Is Strange
- "A joint like you ..."
- "You have no tinkler!"
- Deep Throat
- "I wanna be your slave"
- "My love is like a big blonde afro (Jah-ron-o-mo)"
- Nurse Lovelace
- I'd Like To Teach You All To Screw (It's The Real Thing)
- Nurse About the House
- "I got Blue Cross"
- Old Dr. Young
- Masked Marvel

== Sequels and remakes ==
The original sequel to Deep Throat—Deep Throat Part II—was written and directed by Joseph W. Sarno and featured the original stars Linda Lovelace and Harry Reems. Shot in New York City in early 1973, it was released in New York in February 1974 with an MPAA "R" rating. Although attributed to Damiano Films, Deep Throat director Gerard Damiano was not involved with its production. The film was produced by Deep Throat producer Louis Peraino, who had in the meantime founded the mainstream distribution company Bryanston Films. The version of Deep Throat Part II available on DVD is bowdlerized to the point where the film contains virtually no sexual content of any sort, probably a byproduct of its efforts to receive an MPAA R rating at the time of its release. An Italian DVD release of the film, however, contains its original softcore sex scenes. It has long been claimed that Deep Throat Part II was originally shot with the intention of releasing it as a hardcore feature and that hardcore sequences shot for the film were stolen while the film was in post-production. Director Joe Sarno, however, has insisted in interviews that this is not the case.

Vivid Entertainment owner Steven Hirsch told XFANZ reporters at the FAME Awards in June 2008 that the company is producing a remake of Deep Throat. The making of this film was the subject of the Showtime original series Deeper Throat.

Vivid had planned to release its remake but Arrow Productions, the copyright owner, did not like the deviation from the original storyline or the manner in which the film was directed and cast. They then withdrew permission to remake Deep Throat, and forced Steve Hirsch to remarket and edit his movie for copyright purposes.

Hirsch changed the name of the title to Throat: A Cautionary Tale, and it was released in March 2009.

- Deep Throat II (1987, and not related to the earlier film of the same name) and the subsequent DT sequels, have different actors and directors and, despite the title, are not continuations of the story of Deep Throat. Deep Throat II won the 1988 AVN Award for 'Best Couples Sex Scene – Film' and 1988 XRCO Awards for best screenplay (Michael Evans), best actor (Jamie Gillis) and best actress (Krista Lane).
- Deep Throat 3 (1989) starred Peter North
- Deep Throat 4 (1990) directed by Ron Jeremy
- Deep Throat 5 (1991) directed by Ron Jeremy and starring Victoria Paris, Debi Diamond, Cameo
- Deep Throat 6 (1992) directed by Ron Jeremy.

== 50th anniversary re-release ==
In 2022, which marked the 50th anniversary of the film, the film was restored and re-released and several screenings were held. Since all of the principals and the director Damiano have since died, the movie's restoration was overseen by Damiano's children, Christar and Gerard Damiano Jr., in collaboration with Robin Leonardi, the surviving daughter of another adult industry trailblazer, and a contemporary of the original Deep Throat trio, Gloria Leonard.

== See also ==
- List of American films of 1972
