= Harry Reems =

American pornographic actor (1947–2013)

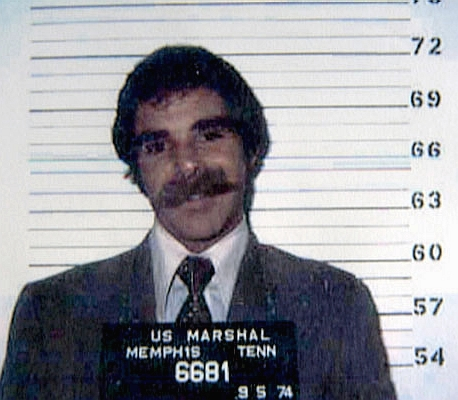
- Reems' 1974 mugshot
- Born: Herbert John Streicher; August 27, 1947; New York City, U.S.
- Died: March 19, 2013 (aged 65); Salt Lake City, Utah, U.S.
- Other names: Harry Reams, Harry Reemes, Peter Long, Bruce Gilchrist, Charles Lamont, Tim Long, Ned Reems, Dan Stryker, Herb Streecher, Herb Streicher, Herb Stryker, Bob Walters
- Education: University of Pittsburgh
- Occupations: Pornographic actor, realtor
- Years active: 1970–1985
- Spouse: Jeanne Sterret (m. 1990)
- Military career
- Allegiance: United States
- Branch: United States Marine Corps

Herbert John Streicher (August 27, 1947 – March 19, 2013), better known by his professional pseudonym Harry Reems, was an American pornographic actor, later working as a real estate agent. His most famous roles were as Doctor Young in the 1972 pornographic cult classic Deep Throat and The Teacher in the 1973 classic The Devil in Miss Jones. Throughout the 1970s and into the mid-1980s, he was one of the most prolific performers in the adult film industry. He became the first American actor to be prosecuted by the United States federal government on obscenity charges solely for appearing in a film (Marlon Brando and Maria Schneider had previously been prosecuted and convicted of obscenity charges in Italy in 1973 for appearing in the film Last Tango in Paris). He retired from the industry in 1985.

== Early life ==
Reems was born Herbert John Streicher on August 27, 1947, into a Jewish family. He was the youngest of three children. His father Don Streicher worked as a salesman before becoming a bookmaker. His mother, Rose, was a model. Harry's father later entered the printing industry and was wealthy enough to move the family to Westchester, New York. In 1965, at age 18, Harry went to the University of Pittsburgh to become a dentist. He later enlisted in the United States Marine Corps, from which he received an honorable discharge following hardship leave. In 1967 he moved to the East Village in Manhattan where his brother and roommate were gaining experience as actors. His early non-pornographic acting career was principally in off-Broadway theater for La MaMa Experimental Theatre Club, New York Theater Ensemble and National Shakespeare Company.

== Career ==
Prior to appearing in Deep Throat, Streicher was chosen by filmmaker Eduardo Cemano to perform a hardcore scene in a film called The Deviates, which had been released previously as a softcore film. It was a body-painting sex scene that Streicher later described as his most painful sex experience because the tempera paint used began to dry and crack. Cemano then featured him in his first 16 mm feature film, called The Weirdos and the Oddballs, which was later upgraded to 35 mm and released as Zora Knows Best. It was for this film that he changed his name to Peter Long.

Looking for ways to support himself, Streicher appeared in dozens of short silent stag films, often referred to as "loops", during the early 1970s. He eventually went on to appear in approximately 140 feature-length sexploitation and hardcore films between 1971 and 1974 and from 1982 to 1985, with Deep Throat (1972) and The Devil in Miss Jones (1973) being the best known, as well as violent exploitation films like Forced Entry (1973) and Sex Wish (1976); in the former he plays a sadistic Vietnam veteran hellbent on rape and murder – later described by Streicher as the one film he regretted appearing in – while in the latter he plays a husband-turned-vigilante seeking revenge over the rape and murder of his wife.

In 1975, he published a memoir, Here Comes Harry Reems, in which he details the early years of his adult film career. Reems also appeared in a couple of mainstream films, such as the sex comedy/horror film Case of the Full Moon Murders (1973), the drama Deadly Weapons (1974), horror films Demented (1980) and To All a Goodnight (1980), the comedy National Lampoon's Movie Madness (1982) and the TV movie The Cartier Affair (1984). He provided narration for the film Mae West (1982). He also appeared in several Swedish-produced porn films, including Justine & Juliette (1975), Bel Ami (1976) and Molly (1977), as well as the non-porn SS Operation Wolf Cub (1983).

For the production of Deep Throat in Miami, Florida in January 1972, Streicher was hired to be part of the lighting crew, although the director was unable to cast one of the roles and asked him to play the part. He was paid $250 for one day of acting work ($1,200 total). Streicher said that he was unaware that the director had given him the name "Harry Reems" until he saw the movie.

== Trial and later years as an actor ==
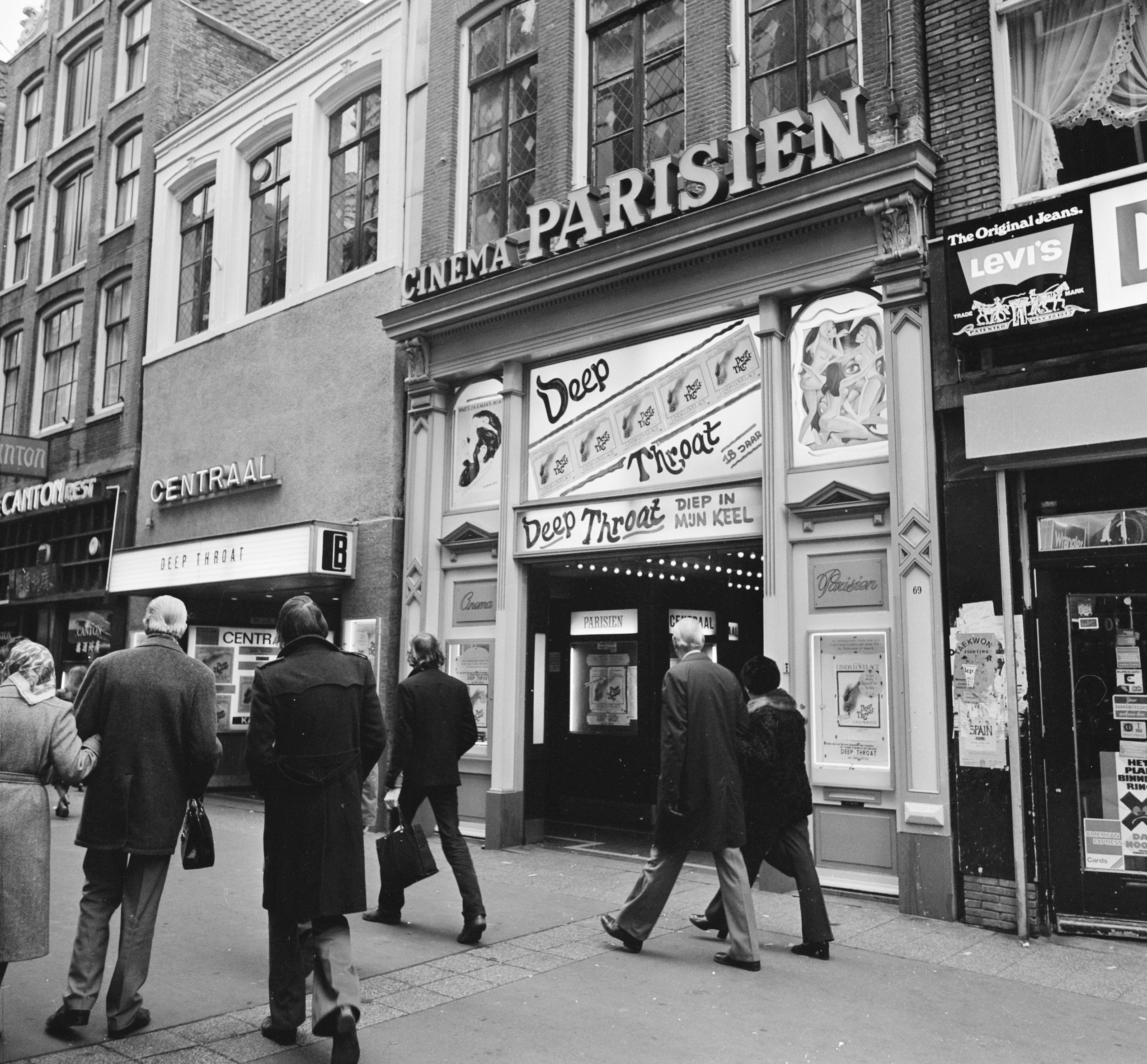
A theatre in Amsterdam featuring Deep Throat

Reems' appearance in Deep Throat led to his arrest by FBI agents in New York City in July 1974 and his indictment in Memphis, Tennessee, in June 1975 on federal charges of conspiracy to distribute obscenity across state lines. Reems called it forum shopping. He was convicted in April 1976 with 11 other individuals and four corporations.

Reems' conviction was overturned on appeal in April 1977, as his activities in making the film took place before a U.S. Supreme Court ruling on obscenity in 1973 (Miller v. California), and Reems was granted a new trial. The charges against Reems were dropped in August. The defense argued he was the first American actor to ever be prosecuted by the federal government merely for appearing in a film, and he received considerable support from established Hollywood and New York celebrities during his trial, including Jack Nicholson, Warren Beatty, Shirley MacLaine, Richard Dreyfuss, Colleen Dewhurst, Rod McKuen, Ben Gazzara, Mike Nichols, Julie Newmar, Dick Cavett, George Plimpton, and Stephen Sondheim. Nicholson, Beatty, and Louise Fletcher were reportedly ready to testify on his behalf at his trial. Reems' successful appeal was handled by Alan Dershowitz. His autobiography, Here Comes Harry Reems, was published in 1975.

Reems was cast in the 1978 musical film Grease as Coach Calhoun, but, out of fear that his notoriety would jeopardize the film's box office in the Southern United States, he was replaced by Sid Caesar.

Reems returned to the stage in the plays The Office Murders (1979) and What the Butler Saw (1981).

In 1982, after an eight-year hiatus from porn, Reems returned to the industry and performed in the film Society Affairs, and reportedly received a six-figure salary. In 1984, he starred in Those Young Girls with the notoriously then 16 year old Traci Lords (who had lied about her age). Reems retired from performing in porn in 1985. In that same year, he was included in the XRCO Hall of Fame, and is also featured in the AVN Hall of Fame.

== Later years ==
After years of drug abuse and homelessness, Reems began his recovery in 1989 while living in Park City, Utah. He was married to Jeanne Sterret, a religious woman he had met while skiing in the same city. He then converted from Judaism to Christianity. "Being the low-bottom drunk that I was, I started going around to churches," said Reems. "I called myself a church gypsy." Reems credited his conversion to Reverend Mark Heiss, a former pastor with Park City Community Church in Park City, Utah.

Heiss was abruptly replaced at the church by someone else, for reasons Reems says were never explained; Reems left the congregation because he believed church attendance was "about putting money in the coffers." Outside organized religion, he continued to meditate, pray, and offer gratitude to God. "If I didn't put God in my life, I'd be dead now," he said. "I am not religious. I'm spiritual, 100 percent." He continued to identify himself as "Harry Reems", even using the name while he worked as a real estate agent. He later was a trustee at a local United Methodist church.

He was interviewed in the 2005 documentary Inside Deep Throat. Reems's entrance into the adult entertainment industry, his experience filming Deep Throat and its subsequent infamy and obscenity trials, are the subject of the 2010 play The Deep Throat Sex Scandal. During the Los Angeles run of the play, Reems died in Utah; his death was noted by the production.

In 2014, award-winning playwright Craig Hepworth opened his play Porno Chic about Reems and Lovelace and the fallout from Deep Throat in Manchester, UK. The play opened to rave reviews, and the 2016 production went on to win Best Drama at the GMF Awards. The play returned in 2018/19 for a UK tour.

== Death ==
Reems died of pancreatic cancer on March 19, 2013, aged 65, at the Salt Lake City Veterans Administration Medical Center. He had no children.

== Select filmography ==
- 1969:
  - Crack-Up
- 1970:
  - Bacchanale as Hardcore inserts (uncredited)
  - The Cross and the Switchblade as Gang Member (uncredited)
  - Erecter Sex 3: Sex Ed 101
  - Erecter Sex 4: Pole Position
- 1971:
  - Dark Dreams as Jack
  - Klute as Discothèque Patron (uncredited)
  - Sex USA as Guy with Bisexual Girls (uncredited)
  - Vice Versa!
  - Mondo Porno as Guy on Couch (uncredited)
  - The Weirdos and the Oddballs as David
  - His Loving Daughter as Freddy (uncredited)
  - The Altar of Lust as Don
  - A Time to Love as Jon
- 1972:
  - Deep Sleep (as Harry Reemes / credit only)
  - Meatball
  - Cherry Blossom
  - Rivelazioni di un maniaco sessuale al capo della squadra mobile
  - Forbidden Under Censorship of the King
  - Deep Throat
  - The Abductors
  - Selling It
  - Mondo Porno
- 1973:
  - Girls in the Penthouse
  - Revolving Teens
  - Case of the Full Moon Murders
  - Loops
  - The New Comers (as Harry Reams)
  - The Collegiates
  - Over Sexposure
  - Filthiest Show in Town
  - The Devil in Miss Jones
  - Forced Entry
  - Head Nurse
  - Fast Ball
  - High Rise
  - Herbie (as Richard Hurt)
  - It Happened in Hollywood
  - Fleshpot on 42nd Street
  - The Female Response
- 1974:
  - Ape Over Love
  - Pleasure Cruise
  - Wet Rainbow
  - Doctor Feelgood
  - Memories Within Miss Aggie
  - Deadly Weapons
  - Teenage Cheerleader
  - Deep Throat Part II
  - College Girls
  - Hotel Hooker
  - Intensive Care
  - The Love Witch
  - A Touch of Genie as Himself
- 1975:
  - Sherlick Holmes
  - More
  - Linda Lovelace Meets Miss Jones
  - Every Inch a Lady
  - Butterflies
  - Justine och Juliette
  - Sexual Freedom in Brooklyn
  - Christy
  - Sometime Sweet Susan
  - Experiments in Ecstasy
- 1976:
  - Sex Wish
- 1980:
  - Demented (as Bruce Gilchrist)
  - Hot Dogs
  - To All a Goodnight (as Dan Stryker)
- 1982:
  - National Lampoon's Movie Madness
  - Mae West (as narrator, television film)
- 1983:
  - Eighth Erotic Film Festival
  - Wolf Cubs
  - Vice Squad Cop
  - Society Affairs
- 1984:
  - Sister Dearest
  - Girls on Fire
  - Those Young Girls (video)
  - The Cartier Affair (television film)
  - R.S.V.P. (television film)
  - For Your Thighs Only
  - Girls of the Night (video)
  - One Night at a Time
  - Private Fantasies 4 (video)
- 1985:
  - Private Fantasies VI
  - The Grafenberg Spot
  - Tower of Power
  - Too Naughty to Say No
  - Beverly Hills Exposed
  - Deep Chill (video)
  - Dream Lover (video)
  - Educating Mandy (video)
  - Erotica Jones
  - Fantasies Unltd
  - Heart Throbs
  - Hot Blooded
  - Hot Nights at the Blue Note Cafe
  - Indecent Itch
  - Loose Ends
  - Losing Control
  - Love Bites (video)
  - Lucky in Love
  - Lust in Space
  - Obsession
  - Older Men with Young Girls (video)
  - Oriental Jade
  - Passage to Ecstasy
  - Rubdown
  - Talk Dirty to Me One More Time
  - Ten Little Maidens
  - The Girls of 'A' Team (video)
  - Titillation
  - Trashy Lady
  - Wet, Wild & Wicked (video)
  - Whore of the Worlds (video)
  - With Love from Susan
  - WPINK-TV: Its Red Hot!! (video)

== Awards ==
- 1986–AVN Award for Best Actor winner–Trashy Lady (film).

== See also ==
- Golden Age of Porn
