= Darby Lloyd Rains =

American actress

- Born: November 20, 1947 (age 78); New York, U.S.
- Occupation: Adult film actress
- Height: 5 ft 5 in (165 cm)

Darby Lloyd Rains (born November 20, 1947) is an American former adult film actress who was prolific during the Golden Age of Porn. She is a member of the XRCO Hall of Fame as a "film pioneer".

== Career ==
Darby Lloyd Rains's early work in the 1970s was in 16mm silent adult film loops, and she appeared as an uncredited stripper in the 1971 film The French Connection. Lloyd Rains is best known for her roles in sexploitation and pornographic feature films such as Memories Within Miss Aggie, The Private Afternoons of Pamela Mann and Naked Came the Stranger. She has been described as "ruling over half of the pornographic film production (good, bad or terrible) of the time", "one of the very first porn stars", and "perhaps the prettiest, most unlikely-looking of the sex vets". After her on screen career was over she worked on set and in production for other adult films. Additionally, after she left acting she worked on a film with Joe Negroni, and would later work with Sandy Fox (Note: Former pornographic actress not to be confused with Sandy Fox.) to form a talent agency in New York City. She identifies as bisexual.

== Partial filmography ==
- This Film Is All About '....' (1970) directed by Gerard Damiano
- Sex USA (1970) directed by Gerard Damiano
- Dark Dreams (1971) directed by Toby Ross
- Both Ways (1971)
- Rosebud (1972)
- The Erotic Memoirs of a Male Chauvinist Pig (1973)
- Lovelace Meets Miss Jones (1973)
- Sleepy Head (1973) directed by Joseph Samo
- Devil's Due (1973) directed by Ernest Danna
- Memories Within Miss Aggie (1974) directed by Gerard Damiano
- Angel Number 9 aka Angel on Fire (1974) directed by Roberta Findlay
- Not Just Another Woman (1974) directed by Toby Ross
- The Private Afternoons of Pamela Mann (1974) directed by Radley Mezger
- Naked Came the Stranger (1975) directed by Radley Mezger
- Slip Up (1975)
- Every Inch A Lady (1975)
- Abduction of an American Playgirl (1975)
- Practice Makes Perfect aka Countrylife (1976)
- More, More, More (1976)
- Ta mej i dalen (1977) directed by Torgny Wickman
- French Kiss (1979)
- Street Girls of New York (1981) directed by Sid Roth
