= Dictionary of Sex =

- Original movie poster
- Directed by: Radley Metzger
- Screenplay by: Radley Metzger
- Produced by: Radley Metzger
- Starring: Pierre Brice; Nicole Burgot; Dora Doll; Brigitte Juslin; Agnès Laurent; Christian Marquand
- Distributed by: Audubon Films
- Release date: 1964
- Running time: 72 minutes
- Country: United States
- Language: English

Dictionary of Sex (also known as Dictionary of Love) is a 1964 American erotic film directed by Radley Metzger.

== Plot ==
Visual presentation of eroticism in a compilation format, which mainly included scenes from at least six mainstream European films, and involved some nudity and a 'love duet' dance sequence.

== Cast ==
- Pierre Brice ... (archive footage)
- Nicole Burgot ... (archive footage)
- Dora Doll ... (archive footage)
- Brigitte ... (archive footage)
- Agnès Laurent ... (archive footage)
- Christian Marquand ... (archive footage)

== Notes ==
According to one film reviewer, Radley Metzger's films, including those made during the Golden Age of Porn (1969–1984), are noted for their "lavish design, witty screenplays, and a penchant for the unusual camera angle". Another reviewer noted that his films were "highly artistic — and often cerebral ... and often featured gorgeous cinematography". Film and audio works by Metzger have been added to the permanent collection of the Museum of Modern Art (MoMA) in New York City.

== See also ==
- Dictionary of Love
