= Naked Came the Stranger (film) =

1975 film by Radley Metzger

- DVD cover
- Directed by: Radley Metzger (as "Henry Paris")
- Written by: Radley Metzger (as "Jake Barnes")
- Produced by: Ava Leighton (as "L. Sultana")
- Starring: Alan Marlow; Darby Lloyd Rains; David Savage; Gerald Grant; Helen Madigan; Kevin Andre; Levi Richards; Mary Stuart; Rita Davis; Joe Negroni
- Cinematography: Robert Rochester
- Edited by: Doris Toumarkine (as "Doris Barrow")
- Music by: George Craig
- Distributed by: VCA Pictures (USA); Catalyst Productions (II)
- Release date: May 21, 1975
- Running time: 83 minutes
- Country: United States
- Language: English

Naked Came the Stranger is an American adult erotic film released in 1975. The film was directed by Radley Metzger (as "Henry Paris") and filmed in several elaborate locations in New York City.

== Plot ==
Gilly, a radio host, is determined to enjoy herself with friends and acquaintances as much as her playful husband Billy. Gilly enjoys herself in several locations around New York City, including at an elaborate dress ball, an old-fashioned ballroom and on the top floor of a double-decker bus while it drives around the city.

== Cast ==
- Alan Marlow as Marvin Goodman
- Darby Lloyd Rains as Gilly
- David Savage as a Waiter
- Gerald Grant as Taylor
- Helen Madigan as an Actress
- Kevin Andre as Party Guy
- Levi Richards as Billy
- Mary Stuart as Phyllis
- Rita Davis as a Waitress
- Joe Negroni as Harold Harold

== Notes ==
The film Naked Came the Stranger was based on the 1969 hoax book of the same name and released during the Golden Age of Porn (inaugurated by the 1969 release of Andy Warhol's Blue Movie) in the United States, at a time of "porno chic", in which adult erotic films were just beginning to be widely released, publicly discussed by celebrities (like Johnny Carson and Bob Hope) and taken seriously by film critics (like Roger Ebert).

According to one film reviewer, Radley Metzger's films, including those made during the Golden Age of Porn (1969–1984), are noted for their "lavish design, witty screenplays, and a penchant for the unusual camera angle". Another reviewer noted that his films were "highly artistic — and often cerebral ... and often featured gorgeous cinematography". Film and audio works by Metzger have been added to the permanent collection of the Museum of Modern Art (MoMA) in New York City.

== Remastered version ==
In 2011, DistribPix released a complete remastering of the film, with the full cooperation of the director. The result had a limited exhibition in theaters, but the main outcome of the project was the first-ever official remastered DVD version.

== Music Soundtrack ==
A listing of the music on the film soundtrack was released earlier.

== See also ==
- Andy Warhol filmography
- Erotic art
- Erotic films in the United States
- Erotic photography
- Golden Age of Porn
- List of American films of 1975
- Sex in film
- Unsimulated sex
