= The Private Afternoons of Pamela Mann =

1974 American hardcore adult film by Radley Metzger

- Original film poster
- Directed by: Radley Metzger (as "Henry Paris")
- Story by: Jake Barnes
- Produced by: Ava Leighton (as "L. Sultana")
- Starring: Barbara Bourbon; Darby Lloyd Rains; Eric Edwards; Georgina Spelvin; Alan Marlow; Levi Richards; Jamie Gillis; Day Jason; Sonny Landham
- Cinematography: Paul Glickman (as "Marcel Hall")
- Edited by: Doris Toumarkine (as "Doris Barrow")
- Music by: Robert Rochester
- Production company: Hudson Valley Films
- Distributed by: Hudson Valley Films
- Release date: December 26, 1974
- Running time: 83 minutes
- Country: United States
- Language: English

The Private Afternoons of Pamela Mann is a 1974 American hardcore pornographic comedy film written and directed by Radley Metzger (as "Henry Paris"/"Jake Barnes"). It star Barbara Bourbon in the title role, Darby Lloyd Rains, Eric Edwards, Georgina Spelvin, Alan Marlow, Levi Richards (as John Ashton), Jamie Gillis (as Jamey Gills), Day Jason (as Naomi Jason), and Sonny Landham also star. In the film, Pamela is spied upon by a private detective, Frank, hired by her husband, Mann.

Filmed in Manhattan, the film was released in New York City on December 26, 1974, and was nationally distributed in 1975. The film has been inducted into the X-Rated Critics Organization Hall of Fame. Porn film star Bill Margold, who went on to be the director of the Free Speech Coalition, has written that "The Private Afternoons of Pamela Mann signals an end to the all-balling, no purpose, disposable mastur-movies that go into one orifice and out another.”

== Plot ==
Private detective Frank records and delivers footage of a woman performing blowjob on another man to her husband, who had hired him. Later, Frank is approached by one Mr. Mann, who commissions him to surveil his own wife, Pamela. Concurrently, at Mann's office, an employee approaches the receptionist, unzips his pants, masturbates, and ejaculates on her face. She reacts with disdain and calls it disgusting.

Pamela is a political commentator and involved in social work. Mann describes an erotic fantasy she once shared with him: to perform deep-throat on a stranger. True to his description, Pamela seduces a man on a park bench. In a nearby alley, she unzips his pants and fellates, deep-throating and stimulating him by hand. She takes his ejaculation in her mouth, then resumes fellatio, and ends with a kiss.

Later, in Mann’s office, the receptionist wears a bib as the same man ejaculates on her again and rubs his penis on her face. She remarks that it was even more disgusting than the previous time. Frank shows Mann footage of Pamela's alleyway tryst.

Pamela's friend, a prostitute, receives a client who confesses he has been gay for the past two years and wants help getting aroused by women. She begins with blowjob, then rides him in the cowgirl position, gradually awakening his interest. After another blowjob, he spreads her legs and penetrates her in the missionary position. It is later revealed that he is an actor who only pretended to be gay as part of his preparation for a role. Meanwhile, the prostitute calls Pamela and reveals she had sex with an actor, who had tried to fool her, though she played along—admitting she had wanted him since seeing one of his films.

Frank presents Mann with footage of Pamela's threesome, during which she fellates a man. Meanwhile, Pamela is kidnapped by a man and a woman and taken to an isolated garage. She initially resists, but as the woman performs cunnilingus on her, Pamela gradually begins to enjoy it, eventually pulling the man in for a kiss. Under the threat of the woman with a gun, Pamela is forced to sit down and the man begins to fingers her. She is made to fellate him as he thrusts into her mouth. Pamela’s reactions alternate between resistance and arousal. At times, the woman demonstrates the act herself. The man ejaculates in Pamela's mouth and rubs his penis on her face.

In Mann’s office, the man ejaculates on her yet again. She smears the semen on her lips and voices her disgust. Frank shows Mann the footage of Pamela’s forced sexual encounter. Both observe how much she enjoys humiliation and forced submission.

Pamela offers herself to the prostitute, who passionately caresses Pamela's vagina, begins to lick it, and bites her pubic hair. She rubs her own vagina against Pamela’s thighs while they kiss intimately. Pamela licks her nipples, and the two shift into a 69 position, with the prostitute climaxing. They continue with scissoring. She then fingers Pamela's anus. Meanwhile, Frank presents Mann with the footage of Pamela’s lesbian sex.

At a political fundraiser, Pamela makes out with a local candidate, engaging in fellatio, lap-sitting penetration, and hand stimulation that culminate in him ejaculating in her hands. Outside, she spots Frank stalking her and approaches him, inviting him to Mann’s home later that night. Meanwhile, the receptionist scorns the man—all while sitting on the table, spreading her legs, and masturbating. Later, after answering Frank's call, she passionately fellates the man.

That night, Frank visits Pamela at Mann's residence. She spreads her legs and he licks her vagina. She then fellates him, and they have sex in missionary and doggy-style positions, reaching ejaculation. As they lie together, Beverly—the woman who had previously "kidnapped" Pamela—appears as her maid and joins them, pleasuring both orally.

When Mann returns home, Frank confesses and withdraws from the case. Mann's driver—revealed to be the same man who "kidnapped" Pamela—escorts him out. In bed, Pamela and Mann watch footage of her sex with Frank and the others. Frank remains unaware that he was manipulated and the events were orchestrated for their amusement. They celebrate with sex—fellatio, nipple sucking, cunnilingus, 69, cowgirl, missionary and doggy-style. When Mann receives a call from a new detective, he repeats the same rehearsed line. He and Pamela laugh together.

== Cast ==
- Barbara Bourbon as Pamela Mann
- Sonny Landham as Political Candidate
- Darby Lloyd Rains as Beverly, Maid
- Marc Stevens as First Man With Pamela
- Eric Edwards as Frank
- Kevin Andre as Frank's First Client
- Day Jason (as Naomi Jason) as The Receptionist
- Alan Marlow as Mann
- Jamie Gillis (as Jamey Gills) as Patrick, Driver
- Doris Toumarkine (as Lola LaGarce) as Journalist
- Levi Richards (as John Ashton) as Hiram Wood, Actor
- Georgina Spelvin as Prostitute

== Release ==
The Private Afternoons of Pamela Manns was released during the Golden Age of Porn (inaugurated by the 1969 release of Andy Warhol's Blue Movie) in the United States, at a time of "porno chic", in which adult erotic films were just beginning to be widely released, publicly discussed by celebrities (like Johnny Carson and Bob Hope) and taken seriously by film critics (like Roger Ebert).

== Reviews ==
According to one film reviewer, Radley Metzger's films, including those made during the Golden Age of Porn (1969–1984), are noted for their "lavish design, witty screenplays, and a penchant for the unusual camera angle". Another reviewer noted that his films were "highly artistic — and often cerebral ... and often featured gorgeous cinematography". Film and audio works by Metzger have been added to the permanent collection of the Museum of Modern Art (MoMA) in New York City.

Linda Williams in her 2004 book Porn Studies remarked that the film is "organized around a threadbare narrative about excessive voyeurism". In 2017, The Rialto Report wrote that, upon release, "it was instantly recognized as being a breakthrough in adult films. Here for the first time was a work that almost felt like a mainstream Hollywood production; it had glossy production values, a smart script, excellent camera work and art direction,".

== Remastering ==
In 2011, DistribPix released a complete remastering of the film, with the full cooperation of the director. The result had a limited exhibition in theaters, but the main outcome of the project was the first-ever official remastered DVD version. A listing of the music on the film soundtrack was released earlier.

== See also ==
- Andy Warhol filmography
- Erotic art
- Erotic films in the United States
- Erotic photography
- Golden Age of Porn
- List of American films of 1974
- Sex in film
- Unsimulated sex
