= Score (1974 film) =

1974 film by Radley Metzger

- Theatrical release poster
- Directed by: Radley Metzger
- Screenplay by: Jerry Douglas
- Produced by: Radley Metzger
- Starring: Claire Wilbur; Calvin Culver; Lynn Lowry; Gerald Grant; Carl Parker
- Cinematography: Frano Vodopivec
- Edited by: Doris Toumarkine
- Music by: Robert Cornford
- Production companies: Audubon Films; Jadran Films
- Distributed by: Audubon Films
- Release date: 1974
- Running time: 91 minutes
- Countries: United States; Yugoslavia
- Language: English

Score is a 1974 erotic romance film directed by Radley Metzger. One of the first films to explore bisexual relationships, it was part of the brief porn chic fad of the Golden Age of Porn in the early 1970s that also included Behind the Green Door, The Devil in Miss Jones and Deep Throat. The film was based on an off-Broadway stage play that ran for 23 performances at the Martinique Theatre from October 28, 1970, through November 15, 1971, and featured Sylvester Stallone in a brief role (as telephone repairman Mike). The theatrical version of Score was written by Jerry Douglas, who later became a mainstream screenwriter. It was set in a shabby Queens tenement, while the film was set in an elegant, mythical land and sported a relatively high budget for an independent film of that era.

It has been released in both soft-core and hard-core versions. One DVD release, a soft-core version, shows a renewed copyright date of 1976 (all prints featuring the 1976 copyright are the director's approved, edited version), but the film itself was actually released in the United States in December 1973. Hardcore prints, including full-frontal male nudity and fellatio, run 91 minutes, while the ubiquitous soft-core prints were released in an 84-minute format. First Run Pictures marketed the original hardcore version on videocassette, though it was a limited release available by special mail order only. The restored, uncut and uncensored (hardcore) version was released by Cult Epics on DVD and Blu-ray in 2010.

== Plot ==
In the mythical European city of Leisure, married couple Jack and Elvira have an ongoing bet regarding who can seduce whom. This comes up in the wake of a swinging night with a couple of tourists picked up via a newspaper ad. Elvira, a self-professed "sexual snob", has bet she can seduce newlywed Betsy, married to handsome marine biologist Eddie. If she fails by midnight, then Jack gets to seduce Eddie.

While Jack and Eddie go to work separately, Betsy comes round to visit her new friend Elvira. She is very intrigued by Elvira's open admission of her swinging lifestyle, including spouse-swapping and drugs. When Mike, the telephone repair man, arrives (Elvira had sabotaged the phone earlier just in hopes of a handsome man showing up), Betsy is fascinated and shocked as Elvira seduces him right before her eyes. She also admits that she is not really happy, especially after catching Eddie masturbating in the bathroom. But she says Elvira's actions are not for her, because at heart she is still a Catholic schoolgirl. Elvira tells a story about Jack, just before they were married, and how he said he would "climb aboard a porcupine" if he had a mind to.

The two couples get together that night, and get slightly high on pot. Pulling out a trunk of costumes, they decide to play dress up. Jack dons a sailor's uniform while Betsy wears a very revealing modeling outfit. To Betsy's shock/titillation (and Jack's huge amusement), Elvira's costume is based on a nun's wimple, but with nothing underneath. They tease Eddie into putting on a cowboy outfit.

As the night progresses, the two wives and two husbands pair off to wander and chat. During the course of their conversations, each of the naive couple admit to dissatisfaction, including a questioning whether they ever should have gotten married. Eddie, it turns out, was Betsy's brother's best friend. There is a hint that he and Eddie were maybe closer than friends, although Eddie does not seem to know that Betsy might realize that. Betsy, meanwhile, lets her hair down and is even a little worried something might "happen" between her and Elvira. She also gets giddy at saying the word "fuck" for the first time. Downstairs, Jack remarks to Eddie that just before he and Elvira were married, she commented, "Jack, I'd hop in the sack with a porcupine if it struck my fancy."

Elvira and Betsy end up in the upstairs bedroom, with Jack and Eddie in the downstairs den. A quick phone call between the swinging couple has them agree that midnight is the deadline for them both. As the late night progresses, both introduce their perspective seductees to amyl nitrite (each says the same line as they do: "Bingo!") and when asking for the time, interpret the respective watches as either "slow" or "fast" depending upon their own desires.

Both Eddie and Betsy are simultaneously seduced, receiving and giving oral sex. Betsy is even penetrated with a strap-on (while wearing a collar and leash). Eddie, penetrated by Jack, has a brief hallucination that the person making love to him is Betsy.

In the morning, Jack and Elvira consider the score pretty much even. Betsy and Eddie are confused, each thinking perhaps the other is the "normal" one. Betsy even makes a remark about them both being "porcupines." When Mike suddenly arrives for a visit, just as Jack and Elvira are getting ready to have a ménage à trois with Betsy, Jack invites him, too, boasting that they "play all kinds of games around here". A chance remark brings out the fact Mike and Eddie both enjoy bowling. Somewhat to Jack and Elvira's surprise, Mike leaves to play with Eddie and Betsy, who suggests they all get together soon to play "Bingo".

== Cast ==
- Calvin Culver (aka Casey Donovan) (Eddie, the closeted husband)
- Carl Parker (Mike Nixon, the horny telephone repairman)
- Claire Wilbur (Elvira Jackson, the swinging wife)
- Gerald Grant (Jack Jackson, the swinging husband)
- Lynn Lowry (Betsy, the naive wife)

The woman who plays Jack's assistant was not credited, and there is no information known about her.

== Production ==
Principal photography for the film was completed on the Dalmatian coast, Yugoslavia, a region which is now a part of Croatia.

== Notes ==
The film Score was released during the Golden Age of Porn (inaugurated by the 1969 release of Andy Warhol's Blue Movie) in the United States, at a time of "porno chic", in which adult erotic films were just beginning to be widely released, publicly discussed by celebrities such as Johnny Carson and Bob Hope, and taken seriously by film critics such as Roger Ebert.

The Yardbirds-style theme song "Where is the Girl" was performed by the house band at the hotel where Metzger and the crew were staying.

When I was coming of age, eroticism was always in films, but eroticism was punished. The promiscuous girl never got the leading man, the woman who sold her charms, always had a bad fate. The "good girl" always achieved ends the bad girl never did. As a reaction to that, I tried to do the opposite. You could have a free attitude and behave in a free way and not be punished. A parallel to that is that it could also be light. It didn't have to be tragedy. You could look at [sex] in a fun way. That was a personal thing, to work against the clichés in cinema when I was growing up.

— Radley Metzger, January 8, 2014, "Interview: Radley Metzger, film director of Score (1974)"

According to one film reviewer, Radley Metzger's films, including those made during the Golden Age of Porn (1969–1984), are noted for their "lavish design, witty screenplays, and a penchant for the unusual camera angle". Another reviewer noted that his films were "highly artistic—and often cerebral ... and often featured gorgeous cinematography". Film and audio works by Metzger have been added to the permanent collection of the Museum of Modern Art (MoMA) in New York City.

== See also ==
- Andy Warhol filmography
- Erotic art
- Erotic films in the United States
- Erotic photography
- Golden Age of Porn
- List of American films of 1974
- Sex in film
- Unsimulated sex
