= The Cat and the Canary (1978 film) =

1978 film by Radley Metzger

- Original film poster
- Directed by: Radley Metzger
- Screenplay by: Radley Metzger
- Based on: The Cat and the Canary by John Willard
- Produced by: Richard Gordon
- Starring: Honor Blackman; Michael Callan; Edward Fox; Wendy Hiller; Olivia Hussey; Wilfred Hyde-White; Beatrix Lehmann; Carol Lynley; Daniel Massey; Peter McEnery
- Cinematography: Alex Thomson
- Edited by: Roger Harrison
- Music by: Steven Cagan
- Distributed by: Grenadier Films
- Release date: 16 November 1978 (Miami Film Festival)
- Running time: 98 minutes
- Countries: United Kingdom; United States
- Language: English

The Cat and the Canary is a 1978 horror film directed by Radley Metzger and starring Honor Blackman, Michael Callan, Edward Fox, Wendy Hiller, Olivia Hussey, Wilfred Hyde-White, Beatrix Lehmann, Carol Lynley, Daniel Massey, and Peter McEnery. It follows a group of potential heirs who are summoned to the mansion of a deceased beneficiary to view the filmed reading of his will, only to discover upon arrival that a deranged killer may have infiltrated the event.

A co-production between the United States and United Kingdom, the film is the sixth film adaptation of John Willard's 1922 play of the same name.

== Plot ==
In 1934, on the twentieth anniversary of his death, the remaining relatives (all cousins) of Cyrus West are summoned to his mansion in rural England to view his filmed reading of his last will and testament. Among them are former surgeon Harry Blythe; flamboyant stuntman Charlie Wilder, who has forged a successful career in California; Susan Sillsby, a noted English hunter; Cicily Young, Susan's female lover, also her cousin and roommate; the marginally successful American songwriter Paul Jones; and Annabelle West, a rising fashion designer. Overseeing the gathering is West's lawyer, Allison Crosby, and Mrs. Pleasant, his longtime maid who looks after the now-abandoned manor.

Cyrus lets it be known in his reading how much he despised and loathed his kin by setting up a dogfight for the fortune and revealing that Annabelle West is to be the sole beneficiary. However, to claim the inheritance, Annabelle must spend the night in the house with the rest of the family and be deemed sane the next morning. Should she be unable to, West has a second reel of film in which he names the secondary heir. As the group prepares to turn in for the evening, they are startled by the arrival of Dr. Hendricks, a psychiatrist at a nearby sanitarium who warns them that a deranged, disfigured patient who believes himself to be a cat has escaped from the institution.

Allison urges the others to keep the revelation from Annabelle for fear of frightening her, but Susan breaks the news to her. However, Annabelle seems unbothered. Allison requests Annabelle meet her in the library, but Annabelle is startled when, while turned away from her, Allison vanishes behind a false bookcase. Annabelle alerts the others about the incident, but each have varying levels of suspicion regarding her claims, especially when taking into account the family's history of mental illness and delusions. Paul subsequently confides in Annabelle that he has discovered secret passageways beneath the mansion, and that he suspects Allison and Mrs. Pleasant may be hiding something. Later, Susan supplies Annabelle with a gun for self-protection.

Paul and Annabelle subsequently locate a precious West family heirloom—an extravagant gold necklace—in the house, frozen in a block of ice. Later, when Annabelle falls asleep, the trenchcoat-clad killer enters her room through a trapdoor and steals the necklace from her throat, awakening and terrifying her in the process. Her screams again alert the others, who rush to her bedroom. The group is initially suspicious of Annabelle's claims, until Paul locates the trapdoor and, upon opening it, discover's Allison's corpse, her bloodied head wrapped in a pillowcase.

When Paul goes to explore the basement tunnels, he is struck on the head by the killer, but survives. Shortly after, Susan is murdered by the killer in the dining hall while trying to locate West's second film reel. While Paul also proceeds to search for the reel to uncover the identity of the secondary heir, Annabelle arms herself with the gun given to her by Susan. On the staircase, she is confronted by the killer, who wrestles the weapon from her before dragging her into a room in the basement. A struggle ensues, during which Annabelle grabs at the killer's disfigured face and removes his rubber mask, showing the culprit to be Charlie. Charlie reveals that he is the secondary heir to West's fortune. Dr. Hendricks appears, and Annabelle runs to him for safety, but he reveals himself to be aiding Charlie.

Charlie and Hendricks chain Annabelle to a medical chair in the basement. Charlie momentarily returns upstairs, where he is attacked by Paul and a fight ensues. Mrs. Pleasant hears the commotion, and enters the parlour, where she shoots Charlie to death. Paul and Mrs. Pleasant then rush downstairs to save Annabelle, who is about to be mutilated and killed by Hendricks; they enter moments before he is about to stab her, and Paul shoots him dead.

At dawn, an ambulance arrives to remove the bodies, Harry and Cicily depart the mansion. Meanwhile, Mrs. Pleasant prepares tea for Annabelle and Paul as they proceed to view West's second reel, in which he names Charlie the second heir.

== Cast ==
- Honor Blackman as Susan Sillsby
- Michael Callan as Paul Jones
- Edward Fox as Dr. Hendricks
- Wendy Hiller as Allison Crosby
- Olivia Hussey as Cicily Young
- Beatrix Lehmann as Mrs. Pleasant
- Carol Lynley as Annabelle West
- Daniel Massey as Harry Blythe
- Peter McEnery as Charlie Wilder
- Wilfrid Hyde-White as Cyrus West

== Production ==
The Crosby character was originally written as male, and initially intended for James Mason. The Cyrus West's role was first offered to Robert Morley and Alastair Sim, while Flora Robson, Cathleen Nesbitt and Elisabeth Bergner passed on the role of Mrs. Pleasant. Horst Buchholz was signed to play Charlie Wilder, but left the project during pre-production.

Principal photography started in December 1976. Pyrford Court, Pyrford Common Road, Surrey, was used as Cyrus West's Glenncliff Manor.

Radley Metzger later recalled:

It was a fun picture, but the litigation involved was horrendous. The distributor chose not to honor the contract. We sued, and it is very difficult to be the aggressor in a law suit. After all those years of defending myself in censorship cases in which we never lost one, there I was trying to create a case on the other side. It took a very long time. We won the suit because it was an obvious breach. The picture was finally released in 1981, but the timing was off. The haunted house aspect helped when it came to ancillary rights. Outside of theatres, CAT has done tremendous business. It was the leader in all those syndication packages. It has never stopped playing. We actually have been living off that picture for eight or nine years.

== Release ==
The film screened at the Miami International Film Festival on 16 November 1978. It was later released regionally in the United States in 1981, opening on 8 May that year in Minneapolis, Minnesota.

=== Critical response ===
Richard L. Shepherd of The New York Times gave the film a favorable review, writing: "Whodunit? If you don't know the story, we'll only go so far as to say that Mr. Metzger dunit, the film, that is. He has a sure awareness of color, the black cat and the white halls, and the film is attractive enough to look at. The suspense is not evenly maintained, but it doesn't matter; this Cat and the Canary is a breezy, pleasant enough diversion for an hour and a half."

James Calloway of The News & Observer felt that the film "has some good ideas, but they are often handled unevenly... One aspect of the film deserves high praise. The murderer is a ripper, but instead of making us watch the mutilation in progress, as most films nowadays would, Metzger instead shows us the killer's grotesque tools lined up neatly on a cloth. The effect is just as horrifying."

According to one film reviewer, Radley Metzger's films, including those he made during the Golden Age of Porn (1969–1984), are noted for their "lavish design, witty screenplays, and a penchant for the unusual camera angle". Another reviewer noted that his films were "highly artistic — and often cerebral ... and often featured gorgeous cinematography". Film and audio works by Metzger have been added to the permanent collection of the Museum of Modern Art (MoMA) in New York City.

== Sources ==
- Lehman, Peter (2006). Pornography: Film and Culture. Rutgers, New Jersey: Rutgers University Press. ISBN 978-0-813-53871-6.
- Rist, Ray C. (1974). The Pornography Controversy: Changing Moral Standards in American Life. New Brunswick, New Jersey: Transaction Books. ISBN 978-1-412-83846-7.
