= The Lickerish Quartet =

1970 film by Radley Metzger

- Original film poster
- Directed by: Radley Metzger
- Screenplay by: Michael DeForrest
- Based on: "Hide and Seek" by Michael DeForrest; Radley Metzger
- Produced by: Radley Metzger
- Starring: Silvana Venturelli; Frank Wolff; Erika Remberg; Paolo Turco
- Cinematography: Hans Jura
- Edited by: Amedeo Salfa
- Music by: Stelvio Cipriani
- Production companies: Cinemar; Peter Carsten Produktion
- Distributed by: Audubon Films (US); PAB (Italy)
- Release date: 1970
- Running time: 90 minutes
- Countries: Italy; West Germany
- Language: Italian

The Lickerish Quartet (Italian: Esotika Erotika Psicotika; also known as The Licorice Quartet, Erotic Quartet and Sex Quartet) is a 1970 erotic drama film produced and directed by Radley Metzger and starring Silvana Venturelli, Frank Wolff, Erika Remberg and Paolo Turco. It was written by Metzger and Michael DeForrest.

== Plot ==
In their castle, a wealthy couple watch an erotic movie with their adult son. Later that evening, at a local carnival, they spot a woman who appears to be one of the performers in the film, and decide to take her home with them. Although a subsequent viewing of the film calls the woman's identity into question, their house guest quickly succeeds in seducing the various members of the family, resulting in the revelation of certain facts, fears and desires.

== Cast ==
- Silvana Venturelli as the visitor
- Frank Wolff as Castle owner
- Erika Remberg as the wife
- Paolo Turco as the son

== Production ==
It was filmed in Italian and later dubbed into English.

== Reception ==
Vincent Canby of The New York Times noted: “I must say I find most of Mr. Metzger’s movies entertaining to watch. They are so, well, ripe with incredible color and décor and movement.”

Andy Warhol, who helped begin the Golden Age of Porn with his 1969 film Blue Movie, was a fan of Metzger's film work and commented that The Lickerish Quartet, was “an outrageously kinky masterpiece”.

Roger Ebert found the film to be pretentious and the plot convoluted.

== Notes ==
According to one film reviewer, Radley Metzger's films, including those made during the Golden Age of Porn (1969–1984), are noted for their "lavish design, witty screenplays, and a penchant for the unusual camera angle". Another reviewer noted that his films were "highly artistic — and often cerebral ... and often featured gorgeous cinematography".

Film and audio works by Metzger have been added to the permanent collection of the Museum of Modern Art (MoMA) in New York City.
