= Therese and Isabelle =

1968 film by Radley Metzger

Thérèse and Isabelle
- Theatrical release poster
- Directed by: Radley Metzger
- Screenplay by: Jesse Vogel
- Based on: Thérèse et Isabelle by Violette Leduc
- Produced by: Radley Metzger; Kurt Ulrich
- Starring: Essy Persson; Anna Gaël; Barbara Laage; Anne Vernon; Maurice Teynac
- Cinematography: Hans Jura
- Edited by: Humphrey Wood
- Music by: Georges Auric
- Production companies: Amsterdam Film; Audubon Films; Berolina-Film GmbH; Radley Metzger Production
- Distributed by: Audubon Films (United States); Constantin Film (West Germany); Valoria Films (France)
- Release dates: May 14, 1968 (United States); October 11, 1968 (West Germany); June 18, 1969 (France)
- Running time: 118 minutes
- Countries: France; Netherlands; United States; West Germany
- Languages: French; English
- Budget: $250,000 (est.)

Thérèse and Isabelle (French: Thérèse et Isabelle) is a 1968 erotic drama film directed by Radley Metzger from a screenplay by Jesse Vogel, based on the 1966 novel Thérèse et Isabelle by Violette Leduc.

== Plot ==
Two young girls grow up together and share affectionate intimacies in a Swiss boarding school for girls.

== Cast ==
- Essy Persson as Thérèse
- Anna Gaël as Isabelle
- Barbara Laage as Thérèse's mother
- Anne Vernon as Mademoiselle Le Blanc
- Maurice Teynac as Monsieur Martin

== Reception ==
Reviews of his film adaptation of Thérèse et Isabelle have been generally favorable, although not with all reviewers.

== Notes ==
According to one film reviewer, Radley Metzger's films, including those made during the Golden Age of Porn (1969–1984), are noted for their "lavish design, witty screenplays, and a penchant for the unusual camera angle". Another reviewer noted that his films were "highly artistic—and often cerebral ... and often featured gorgeous cinematography". Film and audio works by Metzger have been added to the permanent collection of the Museum of Modern Art (MoMA) in New York City.
