= Dark Odyssey =

- Original film DVD cover
- Directed by: Radley Metzger; William Kyriakis
- Screenplay by: Radley Metzger; William Kyriakis; James Vlamos
- Produced by: Radley Metzger; William Kyriakis; James Vlamos
- Starring: Athan Karras; Jeanne Jerrems; David Hooks; Rosemary Torri; Edward Brazier; Nicholas Zapnoukayas; Ariadne Zapnoukayas
- Cinematography: Peter Erik Winkler
- Edited by: Radley Metzger; William Kyriakis
- Music by: Laurence Rosenthal
- Production company: Era KM Films
- Distributed by: Audubon Films; Era KM Films; First Run Features
- Release date: 1961
- Running time: 85 minutes
- Country: USA
- Language: English

Dark Odyssey is a 1961 American erotic drama film directed by Radley Metzger.

== Plot ==
An immigrant from Greece arrives in New York City to search for the man who mistreated his sister.

== Cast ==
- Athan Karras as Yianni Martakis
- Jeanne Jerrems as Niki Vassos
- David Hooks as George Andros
- Rosemary Torri as Helen Vassos
- Edward Brazier as Jack Fields
- Nicholas Zapnoukayas as Mr. Vassos
- Ariadne Zapnoukayas as Mrs. Vassos

== Reception ==
Dark Odyssey was favorably reviewed by The New York Times. According to film reviewer Howard Thompson, the film is a "thoughtful, unpretentious and creatively turned little drama ... a fresh, economical approach to an ancient dramaturgical formula". Gary Morris, another film reviewer, describes the film as having "visual beauty and emotional power" and being a "literal Greek tragedy shot on location in New York City". Film critic Dan Georgakas describes the film as the "best film featuring Greek American characters ever made". Dark Odyssey has been described, by one reviewer, as having a neorealistic style similar to Elia Kazan's On the Waterfront (1954) and Martin Ritt's Edge of the City (1957).

== Notes ==
According to one film reviewer, Radley Metzger's films, including those made during the Golden Age of Porn (1969–1984), are noted for their "lavish design, witty screenplays, and a penchant for the unusual camera angle". Another reviewer noted that his films were "highly artistic — and often cerebral ... and often featured gorgeous cinematography". Film and audio works by Metzger have been added to the permanent collection of the Museum of Modern Art (MoMA) in New York City.
