= The Image =

The Image may refer to:

- The Image (novel), originally in French (L'Image), by Catherine Robbe-Grillet
- The Image: A Guide to Pseudo-events in America, a 1961 book by Daniel J. Boorstin
- The Image, an American music band in which Dave Edmunds played
- L'Image, a musical band that includes Tony Levin
- The Image (1975 film), a French film directed by Radley Metzger based on the above novel by Catherine Robbe-Grillet
- The Image (1969 film), a short film directed by Michael Armstrong and starring David Bowie and Michael Byrne
- The Image (1990 film), a made-for-television drama film directed by Peter Werner
- Bimba (2004 film), an Indian Kannada-language children's drama film
