= The Princess and the Call Girl =

- Original film DVD cover
- Directed by: Radley Metzger
- Screenplay by: Radley Metzger
- Story by: Pierre Serbie
- Based on: Frontispiece, a French story similar to Mark Twain's The Prince and the Pauper
- Produced by: Victor Béniard; Louis Wolff
- Starring: Carol Levy; Victor Bevine; Shannah Hall; Chris Beach; Noel Cohen; Christina Swing; Scott Plank; Steve Gadler
- Cinematography: Gérard Loubeau
- Edited by: Scott Vickrey
- Production companies: Highbridge Productions; Naja Films
- Distributed by: Manley Films; Roadshow Home Video; Image Entertainment; Playboy Channel; First Run Features
- Release date: 1984
- Running time: 90 minutes
- Countries: United States; France
- Language: English

The Princess and the Call Girl is a 1984 American erotic comedy drama film directed by Radley Metzger and based on a French story, Frontispiece, by Pierre Serbie, that is similar to Mark Twain's novel The Prince and the Pauper.

== Plot ==
Two women, who look alike, one very rich and one very poor, decide to briefly switch roles to see the consequences.

== Cast ==
- Carol Levy as Audrey Swallow/Lucy Darling
- Victor Bevine as Steve
- Shannah Hall as Diane
- Chris Beach as Calvin
- Noel Cohen as Andrew
- Christina Swing as Vanessa
- Scott Plank as Stanley
- Steve Gadler as Herb

== Reception ==
Film reviewer Gary Morris notes that the star of The Princess and the Call Girl film, Carol Levy, has some "charming moments". The film, according to another reviewer, is "cheerfully fluffy and consistently erotic ... outside of his Henry Paris titles, [the film] stands as Metzger's funniest achievement ... a fitting epilogue for the age of sexual freedom; they may not make 'em like this anymore, but as long as these films continue to be appreciated, viewers can relive the experience and have quite a few good, hearty laughs along the way".

== Notes ==
According to one film reviewer, Radley Metzger's films, including those made during the Golden Age of Porn (1969–1984), are noted for their "lavish design, witty screenplays, and a penchant for the unusual camera angle". Another reviewer noted that his films were "highly artistic — and often cerebral ... and often featured gorgeous cinematography". Film and audio works by Metzger have been added to the permanent collection of the Museum of Modern Art (MoMA) in New York City.
