= Little Mother (1973 film) =

- Original film DVD cover
- Directed by: Radley Metzger
- Screenplay by: Brian Phelan
- Produced by: Ava Leighton
- Starring: Siegfried Rauch; Christiane Krüger; Ivan Desny; Mark Damon; Anton Diffring; Elga Sorbas
- Cinematography: Hans Jura
- Edited by: Amedeo Salfa
- Music by: George Craig
- Production companies: Audubon Films; Jadran Film; Peter Carsten Produktion
- Distributed by: Audubon Films; First Run Features; Karo Video
- Release date: 1973
- Running time: 90 minutes
- Countries: USA; West Germany; Yugoslavia
- Language: English

Little Mother (also known as Woman of the Year) is a 1973 drama, romance, cult film directed by Radley Metzger and starring Christiane Krüger, Siegfried Rauch and Ivan Desny. The story was loosely modelled on that of Eva Peron in Argentina. It was a co-production between the United States, West Germany and Yugoslavia.

== Plot ==
A woman in a South American country rises from being a struggling actress to the wife of the President, who she plans to overthrow and make herself dictator.

== Cast ==
- Siegfried Rauch as Colonel Pinares
- Christiane Krüger as Marina Pinares
- Ivan Desny as Colonel Umberia
- Mark Damon as Riano
- Anton Diffring as The Cardinal
- Elga Sorbas as Annette

== Notes ==
According to one film reviewer, Radley Metzger's films, including those made during the Golden Age of Porn (1969–1984), are noted for their "lavish design, witty screenplays, and a penchant for the unusual camera angle". Another reviewer noted that his films were "highly artistic — and often cerebral ... and often featured gorgeous cinematography". Film and audio works by Metzger have been added to the permanent collection of the Museum of Modern Art (MoMA) in New York City.

== See also ==
- List of American films of 1973
