= The Sins of Ilsa =

- Original proposed movie poster
- Directed by: Radley Metzger (as Stanley Paul)
- Written by: Radley Metzger (as Gene Borey); based on a novel by Iris Murdoch
- Produced by: Radley Metzger (as Peter Wolfe); Ava Leighton (as Idlewild Productions)
- Starring: Helga Sven; Sharon Moran
- Edited by: Jimmy McDonough
- Distributed by: Audubon Films (unreleased)
- Release date: 1985
- Running time: 96 minutes (US)
- Country: United States
- Language: English

The Sins of Ilsa (also known as The Iris Movie) is a 1985 American adult erotic film, based on a novel by Iris Murdoch, filmed in New York City and, for exteriors, in Paris. The film is notable as the last film directed by Radley Metzger and, as of November 2019, has not yet been released publicly. However, the film was shown on the Playboy Channel in 1987 under the title Love Standing Up.

The film was made during the Golden Age of Porn (1969–1984) (inaugurated by the 1969 release of Andy Warhol's Blue Movie) in the United States, at a time of "porno chic", in which adult erotic films were just beginning to be widely released, publicly discussed by celebrities (like Johnny Carson and Bob Hope) and taken seriously by film critics (like Roger Ebert).

According to one film reviewer, Radley Metzger's films, including those made during the Golden Age of Porn (1969–1984), are noted for their "lavish design, witty screenplays, and a penchant for the unusual camera angle". Another reviewer noted that his films were "highly artistic — and often cerebral ... and often featured gorgeous cinematography". Film and audio works by Metzger have been added to the permanent collection of the Museum of Modern Art (MoMA) in New York City.

== Plot ==
Sue (originally, Joanie), a New York City journalist, is attempting to write an article about Ilsa (originally, Iris), a former erotic star who had lived in Paris, but who is currently in retirement and, initially unbeknown to Sue, who had earlier traveled to Pars to interview Ilsa, now living in New York City.

== Cast ==
- Helga Sven ... Ilsa (originally, Iris)
- Sharon Moran ... Sue (originally, Joanie)
- Laine Michaels
- Stephanie Sinclair
- Theresa Wells
- George Cleveland

== See also ==
- Erotic art
- Erotic films in the United States
- Erotic photography
- List of American films of 1985
- Sex in film
