= Dirty Girl =

Dirty Girl or Dirty Girls or The Dirty Girls may refer to:

- Dirty Girl (2008 film), a 2008 film starring Monica Ramon
- Dirty Girl (2010 film), a 2010 film directed by Abe Sylvia
- "Dirty Girls", an episode of the television series Buffy the Vampire Slayer
- The Dirty Girls, a 1965 film directed by Radley Metzger
- "Dirty Girl" (song), a 2007 single by Terri Clark from her unreleased album My Next Life
- "Dirty Girl", a song by Eels from their 2003 album Shootenanny!
- "Dirty Girl", a song by Rob Mills
- Dirty Girl, an open-pollinated variety of the tomato 'Early Girl'
- "Dirty Girls", a popular YouTube video by Michael Lucid, filmed in 1996, edited in 2000, and uploaded in 2013
