= Claire Wilbur =

American film producer

Claire Wilbur, also known as Catt Wilbur (June 8, 1933 – May 20, 2004) was an American actress of stage and screen as well as an Academy Award-winning producer of short films. Arguably, she is best known for her performance as the seductive, swinging housewife Elvira in the Radley Metzger film Score (1974).

Wilbur was a member of the original off-Broadway cast of Score, which was later adapted into Metzger's film. She played Elvira for 23 performances from October 28 to November 15, 1970, at the Martinique Theatre in New York City, and was the sole performer to make the transition from the stage play to the film. After Score, Wilbur appeared in the sexploitation film Teenage Hitchhikers.

According to newspaper articles published by Margaret Caldwell, Wilbur's longtime close friend, the actress only accepted the part in the film version of Score to make enough money to produce a documentary short written and directed by her friend Robin Lehman. Wilbur also co-produced Lehman's shorts The End of the Game (1975) and Nightlife (1976), earning an Academy Award nomination for the latter and winning an Oscar for the former in 1976.

In later years, she worked as a dedicated animal rights activist and wrote two unpublished books of verse about the Maneki Neko, a porcelain Japanese feline commonly known as "The Beckoning Cat": Maneki Neko: The Japanese Legend Of The Beckoning Cat and The Japanese Legend of the Cat and the Crone.

Wilbur was diagnosed with lung cancer in 2003 and died peacefully in her Upper East Side apartment in Manhattan on May 20, 2004.
