= The Image (1975 film) =

- Original film DVD cover
- Directed by: Radley Metzger
- Screenplay by: Jake Barnes
- Based on: L'Image by Jean de Berg
- Produced by: Marty Richards; Gill Champion
- Starring: Mary Mendum; Carl Parker; Marilyn Roberts
- Cinematography: René Lefèvre; Gaston Muller
- Production companies: Les Films du Griffon; Catalyst Films
- Distributed by: Audubon Films
- Release date: February 1976
- Running time: 89 minutes
- Countries: United States; France
- Languages: English; French

The Image is a 1975 American adult drama that was re-released in an edited version in 1976. The film is also known by two other titles: The Punishment of Anne and The Mistress and the Slave and was directed by Radley Metzger. The film is based upon the classic 1956 sadomasochistic novel L'Image, written by Catherine Robbe-Grillet and published under the pseudonym of "Jean de Berg".

== Premise ==
Jean, a middle-aged writer living in Paris, meets an old friend, Claire, and is soon drawn into her world of sadomasochism along with Claire's younger partner Anne.

=== Structure ===
The film is divided in 10 chapters, titles in white letters on a black background:

1. An Evening at the X...'s
2. The Roses in Bagatelle Gardens
3. Too Much Water and Its Consequences
4. False Starts
5. The Photographs
6. An Expiatory Sacrifice
7. The Fitting Room
8. In the Bathroom
9. The Gothic Chamber
10. Everything Resolves Itself

== Cast ==
- Carl Parker as Jean
- Marilyn Roberts as Claire
- Mary Mendum (Rebecca Brooke) as Anne then Metzger's girlfriend
- Valerie Marron as a Salesgirl

== Reactions ==
- "Anyone into sado-masochism will get obvious fulfillment by watching the surface physical thrills that Metzger provides. The true fulfillment for this viewer was delving deeper into the themes of dominance and submission that the characters were exploring in their relationships." – Boris Lugosi
- "This is a must own for anyone interested in the fetishes portrayed (graphic oral sex, bondage, whipping, and urination), and also for those who would like to see what quality porn can look like."

== Reception ==
The Image received mixed critical reviews. Buzz Burgess of DVDTalk gave the film four out of five stars for content, stating that "Metzger [...] has created a piece argued by some to be the best erotic film ever made." Charles Tatum, of eFilmCritic.com disliked the film, awarding it just two out of five stars, citing a lack of substance, "The Image is just that- pretty pictures of pretty people whipping each other during sexual sessions. Its infamy is understandable, but not deserved." Michael Den Boer praised the actor's performances, especially Brooke's, even implying that she carried the film with her portrayal of Anne. Although initially praised in Germany, the film became controversial later, and withdrawn from circulation.

== Notes ==
The film The Image was released during the Golden Age of Porn (inaugurated by the 1969 release of Andy Warhol's Blue Movie) in the United States, at a time of "porno chic", in which adult erotic films were just beginning to be widely released, publicly discussed by celebrities (like Johnny Carson and Bob Hope) and taken seriously by film critics (like Roger Ebert).

According to one film reviewer, Radley Metzger's films, including those made during the Golden Age of Porn (1969–1984), are noted for their "lavish design, witty screenplays, and a penchant for the unusual camera angle". Another reviewer noted that his films were "highly artistic — and often cerebral ... and often featured gorgeous cinematography". Film and audio works by Metzger have been added to the permanent collection of the Museum of Modern Art (MoMA) in New York City.

== Blu-ray release ==
In 2011, Synapse Films re-released The Image on Blu-ray and DVD. The original 35mm negatives were scanned to facilitate the high definition release. In addition to the visual remastering, the audio was also reworked for the re-release, adding DTS-HD Master Audio 5.1 to the Blu-ray. Synapse also created new cover art for the re-release.

== See also ==
- Andy Warhol filmography
- Erotic art
- Erotic films in the United States
- Erotic photography
- Golden Age of Porn
- List of American films of 1975
- Sadism and masochism in fiction
- Sex in film
- Unsimulated sex
