= Rebecca Brooke =

American pornographic film actress

- Born: Mary Mendum; February 21, 1952; Chicago, Illinois, U.S.
- Died: July 17, 2012 (aged 60); Boca Raton, Florida, U.S.
- Occupations: Pornographic film actress; model

Rebecca Brooke (born Mary Mendum, February 21, 1952 — July 17, 2012) was an American pornographic film actress and model who specialized in sexploitation films, including both hardcore and softcore pornography in the 1970s. Vern L. Bullough wrote that Brooke was "one of the true beauties to grace the porn screen."

== Early life and career ==
Brooke was born in Chicago, Illinois, the daughter of Mary Lee and Edward Stephen Mendum, and she had a brother named Edward. Brooke began her career in theater and played in the original production of Hair in the roles of "Sheila" and "Jeannie". Additional roles she played onstage include "Linda" in Flower Drum Song and "Rusty", the wife of the late comedian Lenny Bruce, in Lenny. A December 1972 edition of Gallery said of her performance in Lenny that: "...Mendum displayed a charm throughout the performance that makes another heavy credit for her career most-deserved. [...] We think you will understand our impulse to revive that delightful old custom of flowers in the dressing room and waiting at the backstage door." It was also during her stage career that she worked at the Playboy Club in Chicago, where Brooke became friends with Hugh Hefner.

== Film career ==
She made her film debut in 1973 with the softcore pornographic film Grace's Place, directed by Chuck Vincent. She was also an adult magazine model who posed for such magazines as Playboy and Gallery. Her best-known role was "Anne" in the 1975 S&M drama The Image, directed by Radley Metzger, who reportedly was her boyfriend at the time. In the movie, there are explicit scenes of fellatio and urination; however, Brooke did not perform sexual intercourse on camera. She performed full hardcore sex in the French movie Les Milles et une perversions de Felicia (The Thousand and One Perversions of Felicia). Brooke also appeared in the 1976 film Little Girl... Big Tease (a.k.a. Captive Pleasures), directed by Roberto Mitrotti, and softcore pornographic films directed by Joe Sarno, including Confessions of a Young American Housewife (1974), Abigail Lesley Is Back in Town (1975) and Laura's Toys (1975). Brooke gave up her film career in 1977.

== Private life ==
Contrary to some of the characters she portrayed, Brooke was a very private but kind and compassionate person in reality. Brooke married (and divorced) twice and had no children. She was known to be very skilled at cooking, and she worked at the Waldorf Astoria in New York City after her film career. Later, she, with her husband at the time, owned a restaurant in Memphis, Tennessee. However, Brooke lost this restaurant after a divorce. Pornographic actor Jamie Gillis (in a DVD interview) has said that Brooke converted to Islam shortly after retiring. In the last few years of her life, Brooke lived alone in Boca Raton, Florida.

== Death ==
Although there are rumors that she is still alive and that she may have even faked her death, Brooke died of an accidental drowning due to a fall on July 17, 2012, in Boca Raton, Florida. Respecting her wishes, there were neither announcements of nor services for her death.
