= Hans Jura =

Austrian cinematographer (1921–1996)

Hans Jura (21 March 1921 in Vienna – 25 November 1996 in Bad Ischl) was an Austrian cinematographer, most famous for his collaborations with the erotic film director Radley Metzger.

In the 1940s, Jura trained in photography and film. After World War II he began his career as a cameraman for short documentary films. In 1963, he was awarded the Filmband in Gold for his work on The Endless Night and, in 1964, the same award again for The River Line. Until 1988, Jura lived in Munich and worked as cameraman for the Wiener Musikverein before moving back to Bad Ischl.

== Selected filmography ==
- The Endless Night (1963)
- The Black Cobra (1963)
- Piccadilly Zero Hour 12 (1963)
- The River Line (1964)
- Black Eagle of Santa Fe (1965)
- The Dirty Girls (1965)
- Sperrbezirk (1966)
- The Murderer with the Silk Scarf (1966)
- The Alley Cats (1966)
- Hot Pavements of Cologne (1967)
- Carmen, Baby (1967)
- Therese and Isabelle (1969)
- The Young Tigers of Hong Kong (1969)
- Hurra, die Schule brennt! (1969)
- The Lickerish Quartet (1970)
- Little Mother (1973)
- Stolen Heaven (1974)
- Dschungelmädchen für zwei Halunken (1974)
