= The Dirty Girls =

- Original film DVD cover
- Directed by: Radley Metzger
- Screenplay by: Peter Fernandez
- Story by: Peter Fernandez
- Produced by: Radley Metzger (uncredited)
- Starring: Reine Rohan; Denyse Roland; Marlene Sherter; Peter Parten; Anne Stengel; Lionel Bernier
- Cinematography: Roger Duculot; Hans Jura
- Edited by: Radley Metzger
- Music by: Daniel Hart
- Production company: Charles Films
- Distributed by: Audubon Films; First Run Features; Image Entertainment
- Release date: 1965
- Running time: 82 minutes
- Country: USA
- Language: English
- Budget: $40,000 (est)

The Dirty Girls is a 1965 American erotic drama film directed by Radley Metzger.

== Plot ==
Garance, a liberated woman, entertains several acquaintances in Paris, the City of Love; while Monique, also liberated, has similar experiences in Munich.

== Cast ==
- Reine Rohan as Monique
- Denyse Roland as Garance
- Marlene Sherter as Nadia
- Peter Parten as Robert Marshall
- Anne Stengel as Madelene
- Lionel Bernier as Michel

== Reception ==
Several film reviews of The Dirty Girls have been favorable with one reviewer noting that the film has a certain amount of "camp value".

According to one film reviewer, Radley Metzger's films, including those made during the Golden Age of Porn (1969–1984), are noted for their "lavish design, witty screenplays, and a penchant for the unusual camera angle". Another reviewer noted that his films were "highly artistic — and often cerebral ... and often featured gorgeous cinematography". Film and audio works by Metzger have been added to the permanent collection of the Museum of Modern Art (MoMA) in New York City.
