= Essy Persson =

Swedish actress (born 1941)

Essy Persson (born Essy Ingeborg Vilhelmina Persson, 15 June 1941 in Gothenburg, Sweden) is a Swedish film actress most noted for her role in the sexploitation film I, a Woman.

== Career ==
Persson made her film debut as the lead in Mac Ahlberg's Danish-Swedish erotic film Jeg - en kvinde (1965) which became the surprise box-office hit I, a Woman (1966) for Radley Metzger in the United States. She appeared in the German crime drama Das Rasthaus der grausamen Puppen (1967) and in the science fiction film Mission Stardust (1967). Metzger hired Persson for a title character in his 1968 French film Therese and Isabelle about a lesbian sexual affair between two schoolgirls. She later appeared in the 1970 horror film Cry of the Banshee, and in 1971 in Want So Much To Believe. Persson performed in roles on two Swedish television series and then left acting.

== Education ==
After retiring from acting, Persson studied art at Konsthögskolan Valand and Konstfack from 1981 to 1984 and became a visual artist.
