= Let My People Come =

- A Sexual Musical
- Advertisement for cast album
- Music: Earl Wilson, Jr.
- Lyrics: Earl Wilson, Jr. Phil Oesterman
- Book: Earl Wilson, Jr.
- Productions: 1974 Off-Broadway; 1974 London; 1976 Broadway

Let My People Come is a musical with book and music by Earl Wilson, Jr. and lyrics by Wilson and Phil Oesterman. Subtitled "A Sexual Musical", the sexually-explicit show originally ran from 1974 to 1976 at The Village Gate Theater in Greenwich Village, New York City. It began previews on Broadway on July 7, 1976, and closed on October 2, 1976, after 108 preview performances, technically never 'officially' opening for regular Broadway performances. The score includes songs such as "I'm Gay", "Come in My Mouth", "Fellatio 101" and "The Cunnilingus Champion of Company C", and features on-stage nudity.

The show was nominated for a Grammy Award in 1975 for Best Original Cast Album. The title of the 1976 softcore pornographic comedy film Let My Puppets Come, written and directed by Gerard Damiano, was a parody of Let My People Come.

== Notable productions ==
=== Off-Broadway and elsewhere ===
Let My People Come opened Off-Broadway on January 8, 1974, at The Village Gate and closed on July 5, 1976. A second New York City production opened in 1985, produced by Martin Marlowe and Bernard Jay. A third New York City production opened in 2013 at The Underground in Manhattan, produced and directed by John Forslund, and featuring new and re-imagined numbers but “far less nudity than the original.”

The show had a 10-year run at Grendel's Lair Cabaret Theatre in Philadelphia, and an 8-year run at the Basin Street Cabaret Theater in Toronto. The show also had runs in Chicago and London.

=== Broadway ===
Originally produced and directed by Phil Oesterman, with musical direction and vocal arrangements by Billy Cunningham, the show opened on Broadway in previews at the Morosco Theater on July 7, 1976. The original cast included Yvette Freeman. Wilson sought a close order but was denied, and removed his name from the production. According to The New York Times, "Earl Wilson Jr. has asked to have his name removed from any credits for the Broadway production of Let My People Come. "I feel that the show has become vulgar," he said." This production did not officially open, and closed on October 2, 1976.

== Musical numbers ==
1. "Everybody Loves to Screw"
2. "Give It to Me"
3. "I'm Gay"
4. "Come in My Mouth"
5. "Dirty Words"
6. "Linda, Georgina, Marilyn & Me"
7. "I Believe My Body"
8. "Take Me Home with You"
9. "Choir Practice"
10. "And She Loved Me"
11. "The Cunnilingus Champion of Company C" (later replaced by "Whatever Turns You On")
12. "Doesn't Anybody Love Anymore?"
13. "Let My People Come"

== Lawsuit ==
"The Cunnilingus Champion of Company C" was the subject of a lawsuit filed by MCA Music against Wilson, and which was decided in favor of the plaintiffs in 1976. The court found that the song, which openly borrows the melody from "Boogie Woogie Bugle Boy" by Don Raye and Hughie Prince, "could not be construed as a burlesque of plaintiff's work per se", but was merely a "commentary on an era" and therefore was not protected by fair use. As a result, the defendants were found liable for copyright infringement.
