= Tove Maës =

Danish actress (1921–2010)

- Maës in the 1946 film Ditte Menneskebarn
- Born: 30 April 1921; Copenhagen, Denmark
- Died: 31 December 2010 (aged 89); Gentofte, Denmark
- Occupation: Actress
- Years active: 1942–1994
- Spouse(s): Carl Ottesen; Jesper Gottschalch
- Awards: Bodil Award; 1954 Himlen er Blå; Bodil Award; 1971 Det er Nat med Fru. Knudsen; Bodil Award; 1983 Felix

Tove Maës (30 April 1921 – 31 December 2010) was a Danish actress of stage, television and film best known for her starring roles in the series of "Morten Korch" films, in particular The Red Horses. Maës was a three-time recipient of the Bodil Award for Best Actress, winning in 1954, 1971, and 1983.

== Career ==
Maës was born in Copenhagen, Denmark on 30 April 1921. She studied with the Danish actor Albert Luther and, in 1942, was "discovered" by Theater Director Helge Rungwald who employed Maës at the Odense Theater. Shortly thereafter, Maës played the lead in Selma Lagerlöf's Dunungen. Maës sought an apprenticeship at the Royal Danish Theatre after appearing there in Carl Erik Soya's Natteherberget, but was turned down. Instead, she worked at the Riddersalen theater, performing in a series of roles.

In 1946, Maës made a critically acclaimed screen debut as Ditte Godpige in the filmatization of Martin Andersen Nexø's novel, Ditte Menneskebarn (Ditte, Child of Man). Her performance in the film about the hardships of a young impoverished girl received international recognition. Especially noticed was her thoroughly wholesome and pure sensualism even while bathing nude. However, film reviewers in the United States (where the movie was seen in an edited version which removed any nudity) dismissed the movie as being too melodramatic. Maës replied in a later interview that the American audience had never been confronted with poverty in such a realistic portrayal on screen. During the 1950s, Maës performed in many of light-hearted films in the role of the sweet young ingenue. She played starring roles in several family films adapted from the popular Morten Korch novels, the first of which, The Red Horses, became the biggest box-office success in Danish cinema. Maës also was able to bring a more serious side to her acting, and in 1954, she was awarded the Bodil Award for Best Supporting Actress for her portrayal of an insane girl in Svend Aage Lorentz's experimental film, Himlen er Blå.

Oh, I'm not something of an innocent baby girl -- I just look like it.

— Tove Maës, translated from Ekstra Bladet, 1946

Maës focused again on her stage work during the 1960s with several performances at the Århus Theatre. In 1966, she caused a public reaction when she went against her usual movie persona, playing against type in the role of a prostitute named Lucy in the black comedy Galgenhumor (Gallows Humor). She explained that she was tired of playing the nice young girl. She also began acting in a series of roles playing middle-aged mothers and wives. In 1971, Maës starred in the title role of Det er nat med Fru Knudsen (Curtains for Mrs. Knudsen). The film, directed by Henning Ørnbak and Leif Petersen, was an adaptation of Petersen's stage play that had debuted one year earlier with Maës in the same role. Maës' portrayal of the drunken and grotesque mother of a small-time criminal brought her the Bodil Award for Best Actress. For the 1975 comedy film Ta' det some en mand, frue! (Take it Like a Man, Miss!) she was awarded the Mathilde Prize from the Danish Women's Society. She again won the Bodil Award in 1982 for her performance as an overlooked but fantasy-filled retiree in Erik Clausen's drama Felix.

Maës is noted for a number of supporting roles on television series including the sister, Jette on Rundt om Selma, the mother in the adaptation of Pirandello's Six Characters in Search of an Author, the subdued Lilly Lund on Matador, and Mrs. Zachariasen on the TV mini-series The Kingdom.

== Personal life ==
Maës married Danish actor, writer and director Carl Ottosen in 1942. They were subsequently divorced and Maës married a second time to press photographer Jesper Gottschalch with whom she had a son in 1952.

She died in her home on 31 December 2010 at age 89.

== Filmography ==
- Onde år (1995) (TV)
- Riget (1994) TV mini-series .... Mrs. Zakariasen ... a.k.a. The Kingdom
- Bryllupsfotografen (1994) .... Stine Svare
- Manden der ville være skyldig (1990) .... Adam's Mother ... a.k.a. The Man Who Wanted to Be Guilty
- Dansen med Regitze (1989) .... Vera ... a.k.a. Memories of a Marriage
- Isolde (1989) .... Older Married Woman
- Hip hip hurra! (1987) .... Kröyer's Mother
- Sidste akt (1987) .... Esther
- Felix (1982) .... Inger Marie Maage
- Trællenes børn (1980) (voice)
- Matador .... Lilly Lund
- Historien om en moder (1979) .... Teacher ... a.k.a. The Story of a Mother
- Hvem myrder hvem? (1978)
- Gangsterens lærling (1976) .... Doctor ... a.k.a. The Gangster's Apprentice
- Ta' det som en mand, frue! (1975) .... Ellen Rasmussen ... a.k.a. Take it Like a Man, Madam
- Mig og mafiaen (1973) .... Lily ... a.k.a. Me and the Mafia
- Seks roller søger en forfatter (1973) (TV) .... Mother ... a.k.a. Six Characters in Search of an Author
- Præsten i Vejlby (1972) .... Mette Hansen ... a.k.a. The Vicar of Vejlby
- Rundt om Selma (1971) (TV) .... Jette
- Frisørinden (1971) (TV) .... The Mother
- Familie Werner auf Reisen (1971) (TV) .... Leena Bahn
- Det er nat med Fru Knudsen (1971) .... Gerda Knudsen ... a.k.a. Curtains for Mrs. Knudsen
- Daddy, Darling (1970) .... Segrid
- Premiere (1970) (TV) .... Ina
- En nøgle til ...? (1970) .... Emma
- Bella (1970) (TV) .... Jacob's Mother
- Sangen om den røde rubin (1970) .... Maja ... a.k.a. The Song of the Red Ruby
- Tre slags kærlighed (1970) .... Old Woman ... a.k.a. The Daughter: I, a Woman Part III
- Helle for Lykke (1969) .... Lady of the House ... a.k.a. I'll Take Happiness
- Manden der tænkte ting (1969) .... The Cashier ... a.k.a. The Man Who Thought Life
- Elsk... din næste! (1967) .... Citizen of Mårböosen ... a.k.a. Love Thy Neighbour
- Kærligheden varer længst (1967)
- The Reluctant Sadist (1967) .... Vibeke Poulsen ... a.k.a. The Reluctant Sadist
- Utro (1966) ... a.k.a. Unfaithful (International: English title)
- Gys og gæve tanter (1966) .... Bitten
- I, a Lover (1966) .... Patient hos Ulla Pauce ... a.k.a. I, a Lover
- I, a Woman (1965) .... Siv's Mother ... a.k.a. I, a Woman
- Bussen (1963) .... Sofie
- Det stod i avisen (1962) .... Woman with carriage
- Sorte Shara (1961) .... Postmaster
- Over alle grænser (1958) .... Clinician Hansen
- Hidden Fear (1957)
- Flintesønnerne (1956) .... Else Flint
- Himlen er blaa (1954) .... Grete
- Det gamle guld (1951) .... Grethe Holm
- Fodboldpræsten (1951) .... Lilly
- Nålen (1951) .... Gudrun Andersen
- Mosekongen (1950) .... Hanne
- De røde heste (1950) .... Bente Munk ... a.k.a. The Red Horses
- Thorkild Roose (1949)
- Mens porten var lukket (1948)
- I de lyse nætter (1948) .... Linda Strang
- De pokkers unger (1947) .... Vera
- Ditte menneskebarn (1946) .... Ditte ... a.k.a. Ditte, Child of Man
- Jeg elsker en anden (1946) ... a.k.a. I Love Another
- Billet mrk. (1946) .... Office Lady Else Tiesen
