= I, a Woman =

1965 erotic film by Mac Ahlberg

- American release film poster
- Directed by: Mac Ahlberg
- Screenplay by: Peer Guldbrandsen
- Based on: Jeg-en kvinde (novel) by Agnethe Thomsen (penname: Siv Holm)
- Produced by: Peer Guldbrandsen; Fritz Ruzicka
- Starring: Essy Persson; Preben Mahrt; Jørgen Reenberg; Tove Maës; Erik Hell
- Cinematography: Mac Ahlberg
- Edited by: Edith Nisted Nielsen; Radley Metzger
- Music by: Sven Gyldmark
- Production companies: Nordisk Film; Europa Film; Novaris Film
- Distributed by: Audubon Films
- Release dates: 17 September 1965 (Denmark); 8 November 1965 (Sweden)
- Running time: 95 minutes
- Countries: Denmark; Sweden
- Language: Danish
- Box office: Swedish krona 2,388,000 (Sweden) $4.5 million (US/Canada) (rental)

I, a Woman (original Danish: Jeg – en kvinde) is a 1965 black-and-white Danish-Swedish erotic film whose break-through popularity helped initiate a wave of sexploitation films into mainstream American theaters in the late 1960s, and inspired Andy Warhol to write and direct his feature-length experimental film version I, a Man.

== Background ==
Directed by Mac Ahlberg as his feature film debut, and written by Peer Guldbrandsen, the movie was based upon the best-selling 1961 novel Jeg - en kvinde by Agnethe Thomsen written under her pseudonym Siv Holm. The story starred Essy Persson, in her film debut, as a young nurse who breaks free of a repressed upbringing to explore sexual freedom. It also featured established Danish movie stars including Preben Mahrt, Jørgen Reenberg and Tove Maës.

The American distribution rights were purchased by Radley Metzger who edited the movie to remove the flashbacks, added English titles and placed it into mainstream movie theaters. Metzger said it was "probably the first feminist erotic film released in the '60s and it pushed a button with every woman in America". By earning more than 4 million dollars in the United States, Metzger credited I, a Woman as the major catalyst for his subsequent success in making pornographic films. Despite poor reviews by mainstream media, the film's box office success encouraged the development of the sexploitation film industry. According to an article in Variety magazine, I, a Woman "freed itself from the exploitation houses, it invaded suburbia and immediately struck paydirt".

== Plot ==
The young nurse Siv is frustrated by the strict restraints of her religious parents and her boring fiancé, Sven. At the hospital where she works, a married antiques dealer named Heinz Gersen flirts with Siv. Although she is warned that Gersen is a philandering playboy, Siv allows him to seduce her and they have an affair. Gersen tells Siv that he loves her and proposes to leave his wife for her. Having only just discovered a new world of sexual liberty, Siv rejects Gersen's proposal. She then breaks off her engagement with Sven, moves away from her parents and finds a nursing position in another city. Siv meets Lars, a sailor, and they begin a relationship. When Lars proposes marriage, Siv breaks up with him. Siv begins dating Doctor Dam at the hospital where she works. Dam also falls in love with Siv, so she stops seeing him and decides that no single man will ever completely fulfill her own desires. Siv has a sexual encounter with a stranger named Eric who Siv realizes perfectly matches her own promiscuity. Eric tells Siv that he won't see her anymore because he is afraid that she will fall in love with him.

== Cast ==
- Essy Persson as Siv Esmuth
- Preben Mahrt as Heinz Gersen, an antique dealer
- Jørgen Reenberg as Dr. Dam
- Tove Maës as Siv's Mother
- Erik Hell as Siv's Father
- Preben Kørning as Sven, Siv's fiance
- Bengt Brunskog as Lars Thomsen, a sailor
- Frankie Steel as Erik, the stranger
- Ebba With as Head Nurse
- Wandy Tworek as Violinist
- Malene Schwartz as Siv's voice (Danish overdubbing)
- Carl Ottosen as Lars' voice (Danish overdubbing)

== Reception ==
AllMovie wrote that as an "adult-oriented drama" and as "one of the first sexually-themed films from Sweden to find an audience (and wide release) in America", I, a Woman was "a surprise box office success" which led three years later to a sequel by the same filmmaker. When The New York Times reviewed the 1968 sequel Jeg - en kvinde 2, they found it to be "dull and pointless", specially in comparison to the earlier film which was "sizzling, bad—and a resounding money-maker".

Roger Ebert panned the film, offering that if a viewer chose to miss seeing one film in 1967, I, a Woman would be the one to miss, and by comparison, "all the other crummy movies I've had to sit through in this job weren't so bad". He bemoaned how publicity compared the film favorably to Dear John, Virginia Woolf, Casino Royale and even Citizen Kane, writing it had "uninteresting camera work, mediocre performances and a mechanical plot", as well as very poor subtitles which destroyed the mood "every 10 minutes by throwing in something utterly vulgar, ill-timed or otherwise inappropriate". Ebert felt the film exhibited "the maturity of a 13-year-old cranking the handle on the penny-peepshow at a county fair". Contrarily, TV Guide praised Essy Persson in this, her debut role, and wrote that "the film's simple but stylish aesthetics are a real treat, even if they can't ultimately compensate for a disappointingly thin plot", and concluded "the film is most compelling when seen in light of the labored progress of feminist discourse; it's an artifact from a time when the notion of a woman taking charge of her sexual life was both risque and revolutionary".

== Releases ==
Release titles include its original Jeg - en kvinde in Sweden and Denmark, Eu, Mulher in Brazil, Minä - nainen and Olen nainen in Finland, Moi, une femme in France, Erotismos in Greece, Io una donna in Italy, Soy una mujer in Mexico, Ik een Vrouw in Netherlands, Jeg - en kvinne in Norway, Jag - en kvinna in Sweden, Ja, Zena in Yugoslavia, Ich eine Frau in West Germany, and as I, a Woman in the United States. The film was rejected by the British Board of Film Censors for its "pornographic" content.

Under its original title Jeg - en kvinde, the film had 1965 theatrical releases in Denmark on September 17, and in Sweden on November 8. In 1966 the film had a re-release in Denmark on July 4, followed by August 12 in West Germany, and another re-release in Denmark on September 7. Also in 1966, the film had its American premiere on October 11 in New York City, and November 11 in Netherlands. In 1967, the film premiered on July 7 in Chicago, Illinois and again re-released in Denmark on August 9. In 1968 the film was released on January 11 in Norway, February 21 in France, and June 1 in Japan.

=== Sequels ===
Two sequels were produced: 2 - I, A Woman, Part II (1968), and The Daughter: I, A Woman Part III (1970). as well as the Danish-Swedish sex comedy I, a Lover. The film I, a Woman also inspired Andy Warhol to write and direct his feature-length experimental film version I, a Man.
