= The River Line =

1964 film directed by Rudolf Jugert

- Directed by: Rudolf Jugert
- Written by: Charles Morgan (novel); Herbert Reinecker
- Produced by: Franz Seitz
- Starring: Peter van Eyck; Marie Versini; Walter Rilla
- Cinematography: Hans Jura; Wolf Wirth
- Edited by: Heidi Genée
- Music by: Rolf A. Wilhelm
- Production companies: Filmaufbau; Franz Seitz Filmproduktion
- Distributed by: Nora-Filmverleih
- Release date: 27 March 1964
- Running time: 95 minutes
- Country: West Germany
- Language: German

The River Line (German: Kennwort... Reiher) is a 1964 West German war drama film directed by Rudolf Jugert and starring Peter van Eyck, Marie Versini and Walter Rilla.

== Cast ==
- Peter van Eyck as Der Reiher
- Marie Versini as Marie
- Walter Rilla as Pierre, Maries Vater
- Fritz Wepper as Philip
- Charlie Hickman as Frewers
- Geoffrey Toone as Julian
- Max Haufler as Dubois, Lagerverwalter
- Dany Mann as Madame Claires Tochter
- Werner Lieven as Pfarrer
- Jean Launay as Lebrun, Lehrer
- Monique Ahrens as Madame Claires Tochter
- Hubert Suschka
- Gernot Duda
- Karin Heym
- Elfriede Kuzmany as Madame Claire
- Thomas Margulies as Jean, kleiner Junge

== Bibliography ==
- Bock, Hans-Michael; Bergfelder, Tim, eds. (2009). The Concise Cinegraph: Encyclopaedia of German Cinema. New York: Berghahn Books. ISBN 978-1-57181-655-9.
