= Memories Within Miss Aggie =

- Theatrical release poster
- Directed by: Gerard Damiano
- Written by: Ron Wertheim
- Starring: Deborah Ashira; Eric Edwards; Harry Reems; Kim Pope; Mary Stuart; Darby Lloyd Rains
- Cinematography: João Fernandes
- Music by: Rupert Holmes
- Production company: Inish Kae
- Distributed by: Cinépix Film Properties; Video Home Library; Arrow Film & Video; Appidan
- Release date: May 1, 1974; (New York City) (USA)
- Running time: 75 minutes
- Country: United States
- Language: English

Memories Within Miss Aggie is a 1974 American pornographic film directed by Gerard Damiano and starring Deborah Ashira, Eric Edwards, Harry Reems and Darby Lloyd Rains. The film pays homage to both Damiano's previous skin flick The Devil in Miss Jones and Alfred Hitchcock's Psycho.

== Plot ==
The narrative structure of the film involves a woman, the eponymous Miss Aggie, recounting her previous sexual encounters to her lover. The younger incarnations of Miss Aggie are played by other actresses. The veracity of Miss Aggie's memory is in doubt.

== Cast ==
- Deborah Ashira as Aggie
- Eric Edwards as Richard I
- Harry Reems as Richard II
- Kim Pope as Aggie I
- Mary Stuart as Aggie II
- Darby Lloyd Rains as Aggie III

== Release ==
The film premiered at the World Theatre in New York City and grossed $55,485 in its opening week, the highest gross for a theatre in New York that week other than Radio City Music Hall and more than the opening grosses of Deep Throat The Devil in Miss Jones.

== Oscar campaign ==
In 1975, Inish Kae, the film's distributor, launched an ad campaign touting the movie for Academy Award nominations. The ads in the entertainment industry trade press touted Miss Aggie for Oscars for Best Picture, Best Director (Damiano) and Best Actress (Deborah Ashira).

== Home media ==
In September 2018, the film was restored in 2K and released on DVD and Blu-ray by Vinegar Syndrome.

== See also ==
- List of American films of 1974

== Remakes | Homages ==
Rob Reiner's film Misery at IMDb has a similar plot, and includes many scenes co-opted from Memories Within Miss Aggie.
