= The Alley Cats (film) =

- Theatrical release poster
- Directed by: Radley Metzger
- Screenplay by: Peter Fernandez
- Produced by: Radley Metzger (uncredited)
- Starring: Anne Arthur; Karen Field; Sabrina Koch; Charlie Hickman; Harald Baerow; Uta Levka
- Cinematography: Hans Jura
- Edited by: Humphrey Wood
- Production companies: J.C. Productions; Spear Productions
- Distributed by: Audubon Films
- Release date: 1966
- Running time: 83 minutes
- Country: United States
- Language: English

The Alley Cats is a 1966 American drama, comedy, cult film directed by Radley Metzger and starring Anne Arthur, Karen Field, Sabrina Koch, Charlie Hickman, Harald Baerow, and Uta Levka. It was written by Peter Fernandez.

== Plot ==
A liberated couple, engaged to be married, are each having affairs with women.

== Cast ==
- Anne Arthur as Leslie
- Karen Field as Agnes
- Sabrina Koch as Irena
- Charlie Hickman as Logan
- Harald Baerow as Christian
- Uta Levka as Sheila

== Reception ==
Slant Magazine wrote: "The kinky 'cheating lovers' melodrama The Alley Cats might not have the high-minded aim of some of Metzger’s later works (including the hardcore Pygmalion that is The Opening of Misty Beethoven), but it is drenched with his penchant for self-reflective wit. ... Not only because it opens, more or less, with a party scene, but Alley Cats suggests Eyes Wide Shut-in-a-major-key in its frank, sympathetic, and lamentably exciting portrayal of infidelity."

According to film reviewer Gary Morris, The Alley Cats is a "typically artful, sexy, sometimes ponderous, ultimately satisfying softcore [film] effort".
