= Little Girl... Big Tease =

- Directed by: Roberto Mitrotti
- Screenplay by: Roberto Mitrotti
- Story by: Ivan Lieberman
- Produced by: Robert F. Colesberry (Associate producer); Marshall M. Silverman (Executive producer)
- Starring: Rebecca Brooke, Jody Ray, Phil Bendone & Robert Furey
- Cinematography: João Fernandes (as Harry Flecks)
- Edited by: Mick Benderoth
- Music by: David Spangler
- Distributed by: Cannon Film Distributors
- Release date: July 1976
- Running time: 86 minutes
- Country: United States
- Language: English

Little Girl... Big Tease is a 1976 softcore sexploitation film directed by Roberto Mitrotti and produced by Robert F. Colesberry.

== Plot ==
Virginia, the 16-year-old daughter of a wealthy businessman, is kidnapped by two men, J.D. and Dakota, and Alva Coward, her high school economics teacher. While the details of the payout of the $2 million ransom are being worked out by J.D. and Alva, Virginia is raped by the muscle-man of the outfit and comforted by the woman, whom she then has sex with. Virginia also has sex with the boss of the outfit. She enjoys having sex with the three and helps them escape after she is ransomed.

== Cast ==
- Jody Ray - Virginia Morgan, the kidnap victim
- Rebecca Brooke - Alva Coward, Virginia's home economics teacher and kidnapper
- Robert Furey (billed as Bob Furey) - J.D., mastermind of the kidnapping and leader of the gang
- Phil Dendone - Dakota, the muscleman of the outfit who rapes Virginia
- John Gilbert - Mr. Morgan, Virginia's father
