= Mission Stardust =

- Directed by: Primo Zeglio
- Screenplay by: Karl Heinz Vogelmann; Sergio Donati; Primo Zeglio
- Story by: Karl Heinz Vogelmann
- Produced by: Ernst R. von Theumer
- Starring: Lang Jeffries; Essy Persson; John Karlsen; Pinkas Braun
- Cinematography: Riccardo Pallottini; Manuel Merino
- Edited by: Renato Cinquini
- Music by: Anton G. Abril
- Production companies: P.E.A. Cinematografica; Tefi-Filmproduktion Ernst Ritter von Theumer; Attor-Film S.A.
- Release dates: August 1967 (Rome); October 1967 (West Germany)
- Running time: 95 minutes
- Countries: Italy; West Germany; Spain
- Language: Italian

Mission Stardust (German: Perry Rhodan - SOS aus dem Weltall, Italian: ...4...3...2...1...Morte) is a 1967 science fiction film based on the early novels of the popular German Perry Rhodan series by K.H. Scheer and Walter Ernsting.

== Plot ==
In a quest to find a source of radioactive material more powerful than uranium, Major Perry Rhodan leads a four-man mission to the Moon on the rocketship Stardust.

On the Moon, they find a stranded Arkonide spaceship, where Commander Thora is trying to save a scientist named Crest, along with a crew of robots. The earthmen find that Crest is suffering from leukemia, for which there is a cure available on Earth. Perry and others take an Arkonide shuttlecraft to Earth to bring back a doctor with the cure.

One of the Earth crewmen is a traitor, however, supplying information to a crime lord who is after the radioactive material, but who sees the encounter with the Arkonides as providing an opportunity for an even greater prize. The crime lord arranges to replace the doctor and nurses with his own people, and upon arriving at the Arkonide ship they kidnap Thora in a bid to gain Arkonide technology.

However, Crest provides Rhodan and Bull with Arkonide technology, which helps them rescue Thora as well as the real doctor, who is able to cure Crest. They soon leave the Moon in the Stardust, promising to return with materials the Arkonides need to repair their spaceship.

== Cast ==
- Lang Jeffries as Perry Rhodan
- Essy Persson as Thora
- John Karlsen as Crest
- Pinkas Braun as Larkin
- Gianni Rizzo as Criminal Leader
- Ann Smyrner as Dr. Sheridan
- Joachim Hansen as Dr. Manoli
- Luis Dávila as Mike Bull
- John Bartha as General Roon
- Tom Felleghy as Moreland
- Daniel Martín as Captain Flipper

== Release ==
Mission Stardust opened in Rome in August 1967 under the title 4... 3... 2... 1... morte with a running time of 95 minutes. It was later released in West Germany in October 1967 under the title Perry Rhodan--SOS aus dem Weltall with a 79-minute running time. It was later released in Spain as Órbita mortal with a 92-minute running time. It opened in Los Angeles in October 1968.

== Reception ==
In a contemporary review, Variety noted the dubbing in the film, stating that it was "only fair" and that the special effects were "crude, the color uneven, but the very audaciousness of the admixture keeps the attention." The review also praised the film score by Anton G. Abril and Marcello Giombini.

From retrospective reviews, Gary Westfahl in his book The Spacesuit Film: A History, 1918-1969 noted that the film contained "shoddy special effects" and recalled "Saturday afternoon serials more than science fiction films of the 1960s". Westfahl referred to the film as "one of the era's most reviled genre films."

== See also ==
- List of science fiction films of the 1960s
- List of Italian films of 1967
- List of German films of the 1960s
- List of Spanish films of 1967
