= Beatrix Lehmann =

British actress (1903–1979)

- Photo by John Vickers
- Born: Beatrix Alice Lehmann; 1 July 1903; Bourne End, Buckinghamshire, England
- Died: 31 July 1979 (aged 76); Camden, London, England
- Occupations: Actress, theatre director, author
- Years active: 1924–1979
- Partner: Henrietta Bingham
- Parent(s): Rudolph Chambers Lehmann (father); Alice Mary Davis (mother)
- Relatives: Rosamond Lehmann (sister); John Lehmann (brother); Henri Lehmann (great-uncle)

Beatrix Alice Lehmann (1 July 1903 – 31 July 1979) was a British actress, theatre director, writer and novelist.

== Early life and family ==
Lehmann was born in Bourne End, Buckinghamshire. She came from a family of notable achievers: the third of four children of author and publisher Rudolph Chambers Lehmann. Her great-uncle was Henri Lehmann the artist. Her brother was publisher John Lehmann and one of her two elder sisters was the novelist Rosamond Lehmann.

== Career ==
Lehmann trained at RADA and made her stage debut as Peggy in a 1924 production The Way of the World at the Lyric Hammersmith. She also appeared in films and on television. She wrote short stories and two novels, including Rumour of Heaven, first published in 1934 (ISBN 014016166X). In 1946 Lehmann became director and producer of the Arts Council Midland Theatre Company.

She was awarded Britain's Radio Actress of the Year in 1977. In 1962 she played the matriarch Bernadette Amorelle in a Maigret episode, The Dirty House. She played Susan Calvin in "The Prophet" (1967), a now lost episode of the British science fiction television series Out of the Unknown, and appeared in the Doctor Who serial The Stones of Blood (1978) as Professor Emilia Rumford. In 1978 she played Mrs Pleasant in a film version of The Cat and The Canary. Other roles include Z-Cars, The Spy Who Came in from the Cold, A Funny Thing Happened on the Way to the Forum, War and Peace, Love for Lydia, Staircase, Armchair Thriller and Crime and Punishment.

== Death ==
Lehmann died in Camden, London, aged 76.

There are 12 portraits of Lehmann in the British National Portrait Gallery Collection.

== Filmography ==
- The Passing of the Third Floor Back (1935) as Miss Kite
- Strangers on Honeymoon (1936) as Elfrida
- The Rat (1937) as Marguerite
- Candles at Nine (1944) as Julia Carberry, Everard's Housekeeper
- The Key (1958) as Housekeeper
- On the Fiddle (1961) as Lady Edith
- Psyche 59 (1964) as Mrs. Crawford
- The Spy Who Came in from the Cold (1965) as Tribunal President
- A Funny Thing Happened on the Way to the Forum (1966) as Domina's Mother
- Wonderwall (1968) as Mother
- The Portrait of a Lady (1968, TV Series) as Lydia Touchett
- Staircase (1969) as Charlie's Mother
- The Cat and the Canary (1978) as Mrs. Pleasant
- The Stones of Blood (Doctor Who) (1978) as Professor Rumford
