= John Cleland =

English novelist (1709–1789)

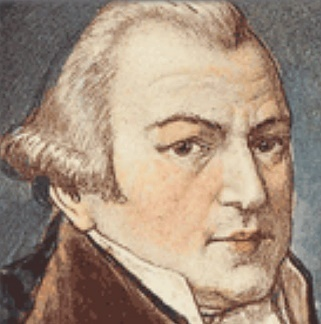
- John Cleland as depicted in an edition of Fanny Hill published by Luxor Press
- Born: c. 1709; Kingston upon Thames, England
- Died: 23 January 1789 (aged 79); London, England
- Resting place: St Margaret's, Westminster
- Education: Westminster School
- Occupation: Novelist

John Cleland (c. 1709 – 23 January 1789) was an English novelist best known for his fictional Fanny Hill: or, the Memoirs of a Woman of Pleasure, whose eroticism led to his arrest. James Boswell called him "a sly, old malcontent".

== Early life ==
Little is known about the early life of John Cleland. He was born in 1709 in Kingston upon Thames to parents William Cleland—a government official, former army officer, and friend of Alexander Pope—and Lucy DuPass. He was educated at Westminster School from 1721 to 1723. From 1728 he operated as a soldier in the service of the East India Company, living in Bombay until 1740, by which date he had attained a position as secretary to the Bombay Council as well as working as a junior merchant. In 1740 he travelled back to England in a destitute condition, and from thence he travelled from city to city without having any defined employment.

== Publication of Fanny Hill ==
John Cleland began courting the Portuguese in a vain attempt to re-establish the Portuguese East India Company around the year 1741. In 1748, Cleland was arrested for an £840 debt (equivalent to a purchasing power of about £100,000 in 2005) and committed to Fleet Prison, where he remained for over a year. It was while he was in prison that Cleland finalised Memoirs of a Woman of Pleasure. The text probably existed in manuscript for a number of years before Cleland developed it for publication. The novel was published in two instalments, in November 1748 and February 1749. In March of that year, he was released from prison.

However, Cleland was arrested again in November 1749, along with the publishers and printer of Fanny Hill. In court, Cleland disavowed the novel and said that he could only "wish, from my Soul", that the book be "buried and forgot" (Sabor). The book was then officially withdrawn and not legally published again for over a hundred years. However, it continued to sell well in pirated editions. In March 1750, Cleland produced a highly bowdlerised version of the book, but it too was proscribed. Eventually, the prosecution against Cleland was dropped and the expurgated edition continued to sell legally.

== Later life ==
None of Cleland's literary works provided him with a comfortable living and he was typically bitter about this. He publicly denounced his mother before her death in 1763 for not supporting him. Additionally, he exhibited a religious tendency toward Deism that branded him as a heretic. Meanwhile, he accused Laurence Sterne of "pornography" for Tristram Shandy.

In 1772, he told Boswell that he had written Fanny Hill while in Bombay, that he had written it for a dare, to show a friend it was possible to write about prostitution without using "vulgar" terms. At the time, Boswell reported that Cleland was a "fine, sly malcontent". Later, he would visit Cleland again and discover him living alone, shunned by all, with an "ancient and ugly woman" as his sole servant. Josiah Beckwith in 1781 said, after meeting him, that it was "no wonder" that he was thought to be a "sodomite". From 1782 until his death on 23 January 1789 Cleland lived in Petty France, Westminster, near his childhood home in St James's Place. He died unmarried and was buried in St Margaret's churchyard in London.

== Composition of Fanny Hill and after ==
Cleland's account of when Fanny Hill was written is difficult. For one thing, the novel has allusions to other novels that were written and published the same year (including Shamela). Further, it takes part in the general Henry Fielding/Samuel Richardson battle, with Pamela: or, Virtue Rewarded on one side and Joseph Andrews on the other.

Officially, Fanny Hill remained suppressed in an unexpurgated form until 1970 in the United Kingdom and 1963 in the United States. However, in 1966 it became the subject of a US Supreme Court judgment A Book Named "John Cleland's Memoirs of a Woman of Pleasure" v. Attorney General of Massachusetts, also known as Memoirs v. Massachusetts, holding that under the US Constitution a modicum of merit precluded its condemnation as obscene. In fact, the novel is now regarded as a "stylistic tour de force" and as a participant in the "making legible the bourgeois remapping of certain categories constitutive of 'woman', and then exposing that remapping as ludicrous" (Gautier x). It has an exceptionally lively style, contains profoundly playful and ironic questions about womanhood, and has a satirical exposition of love as commerce and pleasure as wealth.

== Fanny Hill and homosexuality ==
The fact that the passionate descriptions of copulatory acts in Fanny Hill are written by a man from the point of view of a woman, and the fact that Fanny is obsessed by phallic size, have led some critics to suggest it is a homoerotic work. That aspect of the novel, as well as Cleland's presumed offence at Westminster School, lack of intimate friends and unmarried status, have aided conjecture that he was homosexual, as has his bitter falling out with friend Thomas Cannon, author of the pamphlet Ancient and Modern Pederasty Investigated and Exemplify'd (1749), the earliest surviving published defence of homosexuality in English (Gladfelder).

The authorised edition of Fanny Hill also contains a scene where Fanny (to her disgust) comes across two teenage boys fornicating. The friendship of Cleland and Cannon was "volatile, verging on murderous", but in the opinion of Gladfelder, who rediscovered the Ancient and Modern Pederasty..., "It's no coincidence that they simultaneously produced the only two explicit accounts of male same-sex desire in English before the nineteenth century, published just a month apart in 1759." That may, however, simply reflect Cleland's knowledge of his friend's research and the opportunity to use it in a novel that had a rare explicitness for the time.

== Bibliography ==
- Memoirs of a Woman of Pleasure, or, Fanny Hill (1749)
- Memoirs of a Woman of Pleasure, or, Fanny Hill (1750) (expurgated, legal version)
- Memoirs of a Coxcomb (1751)
- Dictionary of Love (1753)
- Titus Vespasian (1755) (unperformed play)
- The Ladies Subscription (1755) (unperformed play)
- Tombo-Chiqui, or, The American Savage (1758) (unperformed play)
- The Surprises of Love (1764)
- The Surprises of Love: Exemplified in the Romance of a Day or an Adventure in Greenwich-Park Last Easter, The Romance of a Night or a Covent-Garden-Adventure, The Romance of a Morning or The Chance of a Sport, The Romance of an Evening or Who would have thought it ? (Collection of short stories)
- The Woman of Honour (1768)
- The Illustrated Fanny Hill
- Memoirs of an Oxford Scholar
- The Memoirs of Maria Brown (Genuine Memoirs of the celebrated Miss Maria Brown)
- The Way to Things by Words, and to Words by Things
- Other philological works, poetry, translations, periodical reviews and letters

In 1969, Molly Hill. Memoirs of The Sister of Fanny Hill was published, referring to the author as John Cleland. It suggests 17th century language, but should be considered an imitation.
