= Robert F. Colesberry =

American film producer (1946–2004)

Robert F. Colesberry Jr.
- Born: March 7, 1946; Philadelphia, Pennsylvania, U.S.
- Died: February 9, 2004 (aged 57); New York, New York, U.S.
- Occupations: Film and television producer; actor
- Years active: 1976–2004
- Spouse: Karen L. Thorson (1992–2004; his death)

Robert F. Colesberry Jr. (March 7, 1946 – February 9, 2004) was an American film and television producer and occasional actor.. He was best known as a producer of the television series The Wire (2002–2008), executive producer of the miniseries The Corner (2000), and a producer for Martin Scorsese's After Hours (1985), Alan Parker's Mississippi Burning (1988), and Billy Crystal's 61* (2001).

== Early life ==
Colesberry was born in Philadelphia. He served as an artillery lieutenant in the United States Army in the mid-1960s. He also briefly played baseball and operated a bar in Wildwood, New Jersey.

== Career ==
After being discharged from the Army, he attended Southern Connecticut State University, where he became interested in drama. He later transferred to New York University's Tisch School of the Arts, from which he received his B.F.A. in 1974.

Colesberry began working on films in New York. He was assistant director for Andy Warhol's Bad (1977) and first assistant director on Alan Parker's musical film Fame (1980). He was then a producer for Barry Levinson's The Natural (1984), and Martin Scorsese's black comedies The King of Comedy (1982) and After Hours (1985).

He received Oscar and Golden Globe nominations for his work on Parker's Mississippi Burning (1988) and Emmy nominations for 61* (2001) and the television movie Death of a Salesman (1985), based on the Arthur Miller play.

In 1999, Colesberry began his association with HBO as executive producer of The Corner (2000), a six-hour miniseries adaption of The Corner: A Year in the Life of an Inner-City Neighborhood, a nonfiction book by Baltimore Sun reporter David Simon and former Baltimore police detective Ed Burns. The show was nominated for four Primetime Emmys in 2000, winning two including the Award for Outstanding Miniseries, and won a Peabody Award.

In 2000 Colesberry produced the HBO series The Wire, written by Simon and Burns. Simon, Burns, Colesberry, and George Pelecanos were the "brain trust" of The Wire. Colesberry had a recurring cameo on the series as homicide detective Ray Cole.

He was posthumously awarded a Peabody Award for his work on The Wire in May 2004.

== Personal life ==
In 1992, Colesberry married Karen L. Thorson, who was also a filmmaker and producer on The Wire.

Colesberry was a longtime resident of both New York City and Amagansett, New York.

== Death ==
Colesberry died in Manhattan at the age of 57 from complications following cardiac surgery on February 9, 2004. Following his death, the Robert F. Colesberry Scholarship Fund for young filmmakers was established in his honor at the NYU Tisch School. he was survived by his wife Karen L. Thorson; two sisters, Jean Brown and Christine Strittmatter; and 11 nephews and nieces.

His death occurred soon after his directing debut on The Wire second-season finale, "Port in a Storm" (2003). The final episode of the fourth season, "Final Grades" (2006), and the series finale, "-30-" (2008), were dedicated to him. In episode three of the third season, "Dead Soldiers" (2004), Detective Ray Cole (portrayed by Colesberry) dies off-screen, and the episode depicts an emotional Irish wake by his fellow detectives.

== Filmography ==
He was a producer in all films unless otherwise noted.

=== Film ===
Year	Title	Credit	Notes	Ref.
1976	Little Girl... Big Tease	Associate producer		
1982	The King of Comedy	Associate producer		
1983	Baby, It's You	Associate producer		
1984	Reckless	Associate producer		
1984	The Natural	Associate producer		
1984	Falling in Love	Associate producer		
1985	After Hours			
1987	Housekeeping			
1988	The House on Carroll Street			
1988	Mississippi Burning			
1990	Come See the Paradise			
1991	Billy Bathgate			
1994	Being Human			
1994	The Road to Wellville			
1995	The Scarlet Letter	Co-producer		
1997	The Devil's Own			
1998	Long Time Since	Executive producer		
1999	Ride with the Devil			
2001	Peroxide Passion	Executive producer		
2001	K-PAX		Final film as a producer	

As an actor

Year	Title	Role
1978	Rockers	Tourist
1984	Reckless	Marine Recruiter
1988	Mississippi Burning	Cameraman
1991	Billy Bathgate	Jack Kelly

Second unit director or assistant director

Year	Film	Role
1977	Andy Warhol's Bad	First assistant director
1977	Short Eyes	Assistant director
1980	Windows	Assistant director
1980	Fame	First assistant director

Production manager

Year	Film	Role
1976	Little Girl... Big Tease	Unit production manager
1979	Boardwalk	Production supervisor
1982	The King of Comedy	Production manager
1983	Baby, It's You	Production manager
1984	Reckless	Unit production manager
1984	The Natural	Unit production manager
1984	Falling in Love	Unit production manager
2001	K-PAX	Unit production manager

Soundtrack

Year	Film	Song
1980	Fame	Lyrics: "Hot Lunch Jam"

Miscellaneous crew

Year	Film	Role
1977	Thieves	Production coordinator
1978	The Wiz	Assistant production coordinator
1983	Copkiller	Production coordinator

Location management

Year	Film	Role
1977	Nasty Habits	Location coordinator: USA
1978	Fingers	Location coordinator

Thanks

Year	Film	Role
2004	A Dirty Shame	Special thanks

=== Television ===
Year	Title	Credit	Notes
1978	Summer of My German Soldier	Associate producer	Television film
1985	Death of a Salesman		Television film
2000	The Corner	Executive producer	
2001	61*		Television film
2002−04	The Wire	Executive producer	

As an actor

Year	Title	Role
2000	The Corner	Judge
2002−03	The Wire	Det. Ray Cole

Second unit director or assistant director

Year	Title	Role
1978	ABC Weekend Special	Assistant director
2003	The Wire	Second unit director

Production manager

Year	Title	Role	Notes
2001	61*	Unit production manager	Television film

Soundtrack

Year	Title	Song	Notes
1982	Fame	Lyrics: "Hot Lunch Jam"	Uncredited
1983	Un, dos, tres... responda otra vez	Lyrics: "S' Wonderful" "Hot Lunch Jam"	
1993	Lo Kolel Sherut	Writer: "Pesha"	

As director

Year	Title
2003	The Wire

Thanks

Year	Title	Role
2008	The Wire	Dedicatee
