= Let My Puppets Come =

- Directed by: Gerard Damiano
- Written by: Gerard Damiano
- Starring: Al Goldstein; Lynette Sheldon; Penny Nichols; Gerard Damiano; Jonathan Freeman
- Cinematography: Beyen C. Mitchell
- Edited by: Bill Bukowski; Gerard Damiano
- Release date: 1976
- Running time: 75 minutes
- Country: United States
- Language: English

Let My Puppets Come (also called Let My Puppets Go) is a 1976 softcore pornographic comedy film written and directed by Gerard Damiano, and starring Al Goldstein, Lynette Sheldon, Penny Nichols and Damiano. All the sex scenes are between puppets or puppets on human.

== Plot ==
Owing a mob boss half a million dollars that must be paid within 24 hours, a group of executives comes up with ideas for, and films, a pornographic movie.

== Cast ==
- Luis De Jesus as Mr. Big (as Little Louis)
- Gerard Damiano
- Al Goldstein
- Viju Krem
- Penny Nicholls
- Lynette Sheldon
- Jonathan Freeman

== Background ==
While Damiano may have been more noted for the Caballero studios' project Deep Throat, he created Let My Puppets Come using both human and puppet actors. The film was the first of its kind in the pornographic field. The title was intended as a parody of the 1976 Broadway musical Let My People Come and the film was released the same year as the first airing of the television series The Muppet Show, being referred to as "a sexy muppet movie."

== Reception ==
Robert Firsching of Allmovie called the film "light-hearted", noting that the director "uses the novelty of a cast consisting mostly of Muppet-style marionettes". While remarking that the plot is a standard one of producers trying to create a film that will bring attention to their studio, he concludes that "Damiano keeps the style breezy and charming enough that the film is unlikely to offend many potential viewers".

A review of the Vinegar Syndrome DVD version stated: "an interesting oddity from the Golden Age of Porn, and it’s so off the wall that you can’t help but smile—it really has to be seen to believed".

A mixed review wrote: "It's only very rarely funny, which is a different thing altogether than claiming that it's never funny. It's also not as stupid as it sounds, finding room for a healthy dose of meta-humor about the fact that most of its characters are puppets, and ending one scene with an out-of-nowhere reference to the 23-year-old play Tea and Sympathy."

== See also ==
- Adult puppeteering
- Avenue Q, an adult-oriented Broadway musical featuring puppets living among humans.
- The Happytime Murders, a 2018 adult-oriented comedy film featuring puppets living among humans.
