= Karen L. Thorson =

American television producer

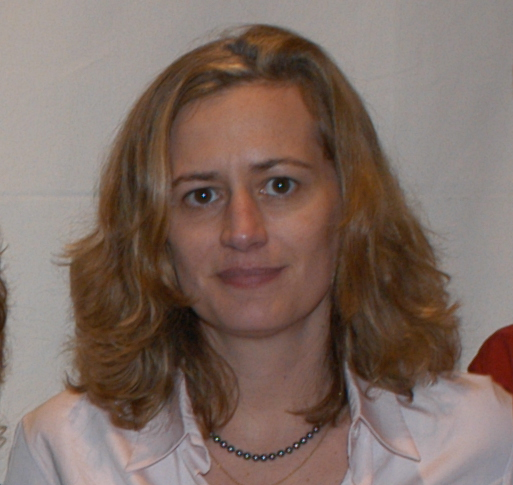

Karen L. Thorson is an American television producer. Thorson was married to fellow producer Robert F. Colesberry until his death in 2004. She worked on all five seasons of The Wire. Before joining the crew of The Wire she worked as an associate producer and post-production manager in the film industry.

Thorson joined the production team as a co-producer in 2001 while they prepared the show's pilot episode. She retained her role for the show's second season. For the third, fourth, and fifth season she was credited as producer.

Following the conclusion of The Wire she became a co-producer for The Unusuals.

She continued her co-operation with David Simon after The Wire, joining him on Treme as consulting producer, as well as The Plot Against America and We Own This City.

She also served as Executive Producer on 2016’s comedy series Brown Nation.
