= The Satisfiers of Alpha Blue =

- Directed by: Gerard Damiano
- Written by: Gerard Damiano
- Produced by: Gerard Damiano
- Starring: Robert Kerman; Herschel Savage; Lysa Thatcher
- Cinematography: Elroy Brandy; J.M. Calmont
- Edited by: Gerard Damiano; Paula Reisenwitz
- Release date: March 18, 1981 (New York)
- Running time: 86 minutes
- Country: United States
- Language: English

The Satisfiers of Alpha Blue is a 1981 American pornographic science fiction film directed by Gerard Damiano and starring Robert Kerman, Herschel Savage and Lysa Thatcher.

The film is also known simply as Alpha Blue.

== Plot ==
In a futuristic society called 'Alpha Blue', sexual needs are fulfilled by a computer. Griffin is happy with this state of affairs and spends his time with prostitutes, but Algon longs for the good old days of love and romance. He falls in love with Satisfier 805, Diana .

== Cast and roles ==
- R. Bolla – Algon
- Herschel Savage – Griffin
- Lysa Thatcher – Diana
- Sharon Mitchell – Hostess
- Annie Sprinkle – Satisfier
- Tiffany Clark – Hostess
- Hillary Summers – Holly
- George Payne – Mark

== Reception ==
A retrospective review for the French website Chaosreign praised the film as an interesting and rare case of Sci-Fi pornography deprived of any parodic dimension. Critics have noted the use of futuristic, if generic, music in the soundtrack. The film is also remembered for Annie Sprinkle's performance of various sexual acts.

== Sequel ==
Damiano directed a loosely related sequel to the film, Return to Alpha Blue (1984).
