= Dictionary of Love =

1753 dictionary by John Cleland

A Dictionary of Love, Or, the Language of Gallantry Explained is a dictionary compiled by the British author John Cleland in 1753 and revised in 1777 and 1795. There is no evidence that Cleland was involved with the 1753 revision, and he died in 1789. It continued to appear in reprints until 1825. It explains the words used by lovers in conversation and courtship in an 'unsentimental' way, cynically interpreting the terms to suggest that readers should not take lovers' words literally.

== French source used ==
Cleland produced the dictionary as a partial translation of the French Dictionnaire d’Amour of 1741 by Jean-François Dreux du Radier, with additions of his own which comprise about a quarter of the entries, and about a fifth of the original content omitted.

== Publication ==
The dictionary was originally published as an anonymous work by Ralph Griffiths, who also published Cleland's novel Fanny Hill. Griffiths reviewed the book in his journal, the Monthly Review. Because of the lack of attribution, its authorship was unknown for many years, but in 1979 Roger Lonsdale discovered a note by Griffiths in his own copy of the review, identifying 'Mr Cleland' as the author.
