= Bryllupsfotografen =

- Directed by: Johan Bergenstråhle
- Written by: Johan Bergenstråhle; Dag Solstad
- Starring: Kurt Ravn; Ilse Rande
- Release date: 14 October 1994
- Running time: 85 minutes
- Country: Norway
- Language: Norwegian

Bryllupsfotografen (English: The wedding photographer) is a 1994 Norwegian drama film directed by Johan Bergenstråhle, starring Kurt Ravn and Ilse Rande. Daniel Svare (Ravn) is an accomplished photographer and a socially engaged documentary film maker, who experiences a mid-life crisis. He leaves his wife and children to start up as a wedding photographer in his old home town, but his past catches up with him.
