= Gerard Damiano =

American film director (1928–2008)

- Born: Gerardo Rocco Damiano; August 4, 1928; New York City, U.S.
- Died: October 25, 2008 (aged 80); Fort Myers, Florida, U.S.
- Occupations: Director; producer; writer
- Years active: 1969–1994
- Spouses: Barbara Walton (divorced) Paula Morton (m. 1975, divorced)
- Partner: Annie Sprinkle
- Children: 2

Gerardo Rocco "Gerard" Damiano (August 4, 1928 – October 25, 2008) was an American director of adult films.

Damiano wrote and directed the 1972 pornographic film Deep Throat, which starred Linda Lovelace. He also directed The Devil in Miss Jones, which ranked No. 7 in Variety's list of the top-grossing pictures of 1973. Deep Throat came in at No. 11 that year, its second consecutive year on the list. Damiano is one of the seminal directors of what is known as The Golden Age of Porn (1969–1984).

== Biography ==
=== Early life ===
Gerard Damiano was born Gerardo Rocco Damiano to an Italian American Catholic family in the Bronx, New York City. When he was six, his father died; his mother never remarried. He was a shoeshine boy in Times Square and worked in an automat. On the day he turned 17 he enlisted in the United States Navy; he served for four years. After his discharge, at the age of 21 years, Damiano studied X-ray technology on the G.I. Bill, and was an X-ray technician at Jamaica Hospital, in Queens, New York. He then opened a hairdressing salon with a friend in New York City. He frequently overheard sexual gossip at the salon; this convinced him that pornographic films made to appeal to couples would be a commercial success.

=== Entrance into porn ===
Damiano took an interest in film-making after his accountant introduced him to a producer who was making a low-budget horror film. Intrigued, Damiano began helping out as he could on the set, and went on to work as a crew member on numerous New York sexploitation films in the late 1960s.

==== Deep Throat ====
He directed the famous film Deep Throat, which was released in 1972 and starred Linda Lovelace and Harry Reems. The film is regarded as pioneering, and its success is credited with helping to launch the modern adult-entertainment industry.

Damiano was surprised that the film attracted such attention. The film was financed by organized crime, and he did not benefit from the film's substantial commercial success.

Other notable films made by Damiano included The Devil in Miss Jones (1973), Memories Within Miss Aggie (1974), The Story of Joanna (1975), Let My Puppets Come (1976), Odyssey (1977), The Satisfiers of Alpha Blue (1980) and Skinflicks (1981).

==== Recognition in Variety ====
In 1973, The Devil in Miss Jones made the Variety list of the top ten highest-grossing pictures of the year; Deep Throat, then in its second year of release (and second year on the list), just missed the top 10, coming in at No. 11 for the year. The Devil in Miss Jones racked up box office receipts of $7.7 million for the year, coming in just below the James Bond-franchise entry Live and Let Die and Peter Bogdanovich's Paper Moon. Deep Throat grossed $4.6 million for the year, placing it ahead of the prestige picture Sleuth, which featured Oscar-nominated performances by Laurence Olivier and Michael Caine. In 1975, Inish Kae, the film's distributor, launched an ad campaign touting the movie for Academy Award nominations. The ads in the entertainment industry trade press touted Miss Aggie for Oscars for Best Picture, Best Director (Damiano) and Best Actress (Deborah Ashira).

Damiano often appeared in his own films in small non-sexual side roles, and used the names "Albert Gork", "Al Gork", "Jerry Gerard" – under which name he had actually produced and directed Deep Throat – or "D. Furred". He directed more than 50 adult films during his career.

=== Personal life ===
He married three times; with his second wife, Barbara Walton, he had two children, Christar and Gerard Jr.

Aged 18, Annie Sprinkle – then known as Ellen F Steinberg – began working at the ticket booth at the Cine-Plaza Theatre in Tucson, Arizona, when Deep Throat (1972) was playing. The film was busted, and when Steinberg had to appear in court as a witness, she met and began a relationship with Damiano, becoming his mistress. She followed him to New York City.

He was interviewed for the 2005 documentary Inside Deep Throat.

=== Death ===
Damiano died on October 25, 2008, in a Fort Myers, Florida hospital, at the age of 80 years, following complications from a stroke he had suffered in September.

== Filmography (partial) ==
1. We All Go Down (1969)
2. Changes (1970; documentary)
3. Teenie Tulip (1970)
4. The Marriage Manual (1970; documentary)
5. The Magical Ring (1971)
6. Sex USA (1971; uncredited)
7. Deep Throat (1972; as Jerry Gerard)
8. Meatball (1972; as D. Furred)
9. The Devil in Miss Jones (1973)
10. Memories Within Miss Aggie (1974)
11. Legacy of Satan (1974)
12. Portrait (1974; uncredited)
13. The Story of Joanna (1975)
14. Let My Puppets Come (1976)
15. Joint Venture (1977)
16. Odyssey: The Ultimate Trip (1977)
17. Joint Venture (1977; uncredited)
18. The Confessions of Linda Lovelace (1977; uncredited)
19. Skin-Flicks (1978)
20. Fantasy (1979)
21. People (1979)
22. For Richer, for Poorer (1979)
23. Beyond Your Wildest Dreams (1981)
24. The Satisfiers of Alpha Blue (1981)
25. Never So Deep (1981)
26. Consenting Adults (1982)
27. Night Hunger (1983)
28. Whose Fantasy Is This Anyway? (1984; video)
29. Throat 12 Years After (1984)
30. Return to Alpha Blue (1984; video)
31. Inside Everybody (1984; video)
32. Flesh and Fantasy (1985)
33. Cravings (1985)
34. Forbidden Bodies (1986; video)
35. Ultrasex (1987)
36. Slightly Used (1987; video)
37. Maximum Head (1987)
38. Lessons in Lust (1987; video)
39. Future Sodom (1987; video)
40. Ruthless Women (1988)
41. Candy's Little Sister Sugar (1988; video)
42. Splendor in the Ass (1989; alternative title: Sex Express)
43. Young Girls in Tight Jeans (1989)
44. Perils of Paula (1989; video)
45. Dirty Movies (1989; video)
46. Proposta oscena (1991; video)
47. Just for the Hell of It (1991)
48. Manbait (1991)
49. Manbait Part 2 (1991; video)
50. Giochi di Coppia (1991)
51. The Last Couple (1992)
52. The Naked Goddess (1992)
53. The Naked Goddess II (1992; video)

== Awards ==
- 2008 XBIZ Award – Lifetime Achievement in Movie Production

== See also ==
The following listing includes related award-winning directors of adult erotic films:

- Andrew Blake
- Bill Osco
- Mario Salieri
- Michael Ninn
- Philip Mond
- Radley Metzger
- Tinto Brass
