= Joe Negroni =

American singer (1940–1978)

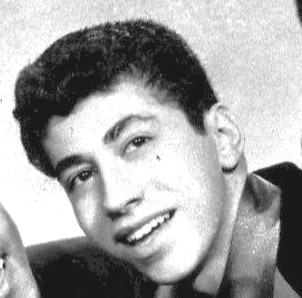
- Negroni in 1956

Background information
- Born: Jose Negroni; September 9, 1940; New York City, New York
- Died: September 5, 1978 (aged 37) New York City
- Genres: Rock and Roll
- Occupation: Singer
- Years active: 1955–1978
- Label: Gee

Jose Negroni (September 9, 1940 – September 5, 1978) was an American singer of Puerto Rican descent. He was a rock and roll pioneer and founding member of the rock and roll group Frankie Lymon and the Teenagers.

== Early years ==
Negroni's family moved from Puerto Rico to New York City in the 1930s during the Great Depression era. The family lived in Manhattan, where Negroni met and befriended Herman Santiago. In the early 1950s, Negroni, Santiago, and two other friends, Jimmy Merchant and Sherman Garnes, would get together in front of Santiago's stoops (building stairs) and sing songs to the beat of Doo-Wops.

Negroni, who had a baritone voice, and his friends called themselves the "Ermines" with Santiago as lead singer. On one occasion, they performed alongside the "Cadillacs" at P.S. 143 (Public School 143). The Ermines changed their name to "Coupe de Villes" and later to "The Premiers".

== The "Teenagers" ==
Negroni was 5 foot 8 as a teenager and an adult. In 1954, 12-year-old Frankie Lymon worked in a grocery store. One night, The Premiers and Lymon's brother performed in a talent show held at JHS Stitt (Junior High School Stitt). Lymon approached The Premiers, telling them how good they sounded. They started jamming together, and the Premiers were impressed with the sound of Lymon's high tenor/boy soprano voice. Lymon sang a few numbers with them, like "You Painted Pictures" and "Lily Maebelle," and by early 1955, they had invited him to join, with Lymon singing first tenor behind Santiago's lead.

In 1955, Richard Barrett, a scout for "Gee Records," heard them singing and introduced them to George Goldner, the owner of Gee. Upon hearing them sing, Goldner signed them to a contract and changed the group's name to "The Teenagers." The following day, the group was supposed to meet with Goldner in the studio for a recording session. Santiago, who was the lead singer, was ill and could not accompany the other members; therefore, he gave Negroni the music sheet with the words to the song that he had written. The song was "Why Do Fools Fall in Love" (which was originally reworked from a poem called "Why Do Birds Sing So Gay"). Since Santiago was not present, Goldner asked Lymon if he could sing the song. Lymon accepted, and they recorded the song. Goldner then changed the group's name to "Frankie Lymon and the Teenagers" and released the record. The song became an instant hit in the United States, and in the United Kingdom, it also became the first top British hit of an American vocal group. In London, the group played at the Palladium. Upon hearing them sing, young girls acted wild, a matter that bothered the establishment more than somewhat. Alan Freed signed them for two movies.

The Teenagers had three other hits that reached the top 10 in the R&B charts: "I Want You to Be My Girl" (#3), "Who Can Explain?" (#7), and "The ABC's of Love" (#8).

== Later years and death ==
In 1957, Frankie Lymon, upon the urging of Goldner, left "the Teenagers" and went solo. Eventually, the group broke up. Santiago tried to reunite "the Teenagers" in the 1970s and 1980s, in ill–fated comeback attempts. On February 27, 1968, Lymon was found dead on the floor of his grandmother's bathroom from a heroin overdose. In 1977, Garnes had died from a heart attack, and on September 5, 1978, Negroni died from a cerebral hemorrhage in a New York apartment or home, just four days before his 38th birthday. Negroni was found unresponsive by his girlfriend, and Negroni was rushed to the hospital and died there. Negroni was survived by his three children, two daughters and a son.

In 1993, Joe Negroni, Herman Santiago, Frankie Lymon, Jimmy Merchant, and Sherman Garnes—the original members of "the Teenagers"—were inducted into the Rock and Roll Hall of Fame, and in 2000, they were inducted into the Vocal Group Hall of Fame. In the 1998 film "Why Do Fools Fall in Love," the role of Negroni was played by actor Jon Huertas.

== See also ==
- List of Puerto Ricans
- Corsican immigration to Puerto Rico
