= The Image (novel) =

Book by Catherine Robbe-Grillet

- Author: Jean de Berg
- Original title: L'Image
- Language: French
- Genre: Erotic novel
- Publisher: Gala (French version); Grove Press (English version)
- Publication date: 1956 (Eng. trans. June 1966)
- Publication place: France
- Media type: Print (Hardback & Paperback)

The Image (or in French "L'Image") is a classic 1956 sadomasochistic erotic novel, written by Catherine Robbe-Grillet and published under the pseudonym of Jean de Berg by éditions de Minuit in 1956.

It was made into a 1975 film, The Image, also known as The Punishment of Anne.

== Appraisals ==
Edmund White considered the novel "scandalous but eloquent...metaphysical".

Susan Sontag placed the text among the very few (5) erotic novels she considered to have serious artistic weight.

== Theme ==
The Image is centred on a triangular relationship between the male narrator and two women, Anne and Claire. The narrator is puzzled by the meaning of their behavior throughout, gradually accumulating clues which only make full sense in the closing chapter, when Anne is revealed as the mirror image of the woman he actually loves, Claire.

== See also ==
- Abjection
- Sadism and masochism in fiction
- The Imaginary
