= Radley Metzger =

American filmmaker and film distributor (1929–2017)

- Born: January 21, 1929; New York City, New York, U.S.
- Died: March 31, 2017 (aged 88); New York City, New York, U.S.
- Education: B. A. degree in Dramatic Arts
- Alma mater: City College of New York; Columbia University
- Occupation: Film director
- Years active: 1957–2010s
- Known for: Artistic, adult-oriented films and related works
- Notable work: Thérèse and Isabelle (1968); Camille 2000 (1969); The Lickerish Quartet (1970); Score (1974); The Private Afternoons of Pamela Mann (1974); The Image (1975); The Opening of Misty Beethoven (1976); Barbara Broadcast (1977)
- Style: "a Euro-centric combination of stylish decadence, wealth and the aristocratic".
- Children: daughter
- Parent(s): Julius; Anne
- Relatives: nephew, nieces
- Awards: AFAA (direction); X-Caliber (direction); OIFF (lifetime achievement)

Radley Metzger (Note: also known as Radley Henry Metzger, Radley H. Metzger and by the pseudonyms, "Jake Barnes", "Erich Farina" and "Henry Paris") (January 21, 1929 – March 31, 2017) was an American filmmaker and film distributor, most noted for popular artistic pornographic films, including Thérèse and Isabelle (1968), Camille 2000 (1969), The Lickerish Quartet (1970), Score (1974), The Private Afternoons of Pamela Mann (1974), The Image (1975), The Opening of Misty Beethoven (1976) and Barbara Broadcast (1977). According to one film reviewer, Metzger's films, including those made during the Golden Age of Porn (1969–1984), are noted for their "lavish design, witty screenplays, and a penchant for the unusual camera angle". Film and audio works by Metzger have been added to the permanent collection of the Museum of Modern Art (MoMA) in New York City.

== Early life ==
Radley Henry Metzger was born on January 21, 1929, on the Grand Concourse in The Bronx, New York City, and was the second son of Jewish parents, Julius and Anne. He said he found relief from his allergies in movie theaters, especially at the Audubon Ballroom theatre, while growing up. Later, Metzger received a B.A. in dramatic arts from City College of New York, where he studied with filmmakers Hans Richter and Leo Seltzer. He also studied acting privately with director Harold Clurman. During the Korean War, Metzger served in the U. S. Air Force with the 1350th Photographic Group, which interrupted his graduate studies at Columbia University. His older brother, now deceased, had become a physician. Metzger later married and had a daughter.

== Career ==
Early in his career, in the 1950s, Metzger worked primarily as a film editor and was a member of Local 771 of the IATSE. He was employed in editing trailers for Janus Films, a major distributor of foreign art films, especially those of Michelangelo Antonioni, Ingmar Bergman, Federico Fellini, Jean-Luc Godard and François Truffaut. In 1953, Metzger was credited as assistant director to William Kyriakis on the film Guerilla Girl. In 1956, he worked on the dubbing of And God Created Woman starring Brigitte Bardot. His directorial film debut, Dark Odyssey (1961) (co-directed with Kyriakis), was a drama concerning the experiences of a Greek immigrant arriving in New York. The film was favorably reviewed by The New York Times and others. In 1959, he edited the film The Gangster Story starring Walter Matthau and, in 1960, Metzger was a presenter for the Japanese film The Warped Ones.

Later, in 1961, along with film distributor Ava Leighton, Metzger founded Audubon Films. The company was named after the Audubon Ballroom theatre, one of his favorite movie theaters while growing up. The newly founded distribution company specialized in importing international features, some of which were marketed into the gradually expanding erotic film genre. Metzger's skills as an editor were employed in re-cutting and augmenting many of the features Audubon handled, including Les Collégiennes (The Twilight Girls) (FR,1957) and, their first runaway success, Mac Ahlberg's I, a Woman (DN/SW,1965).

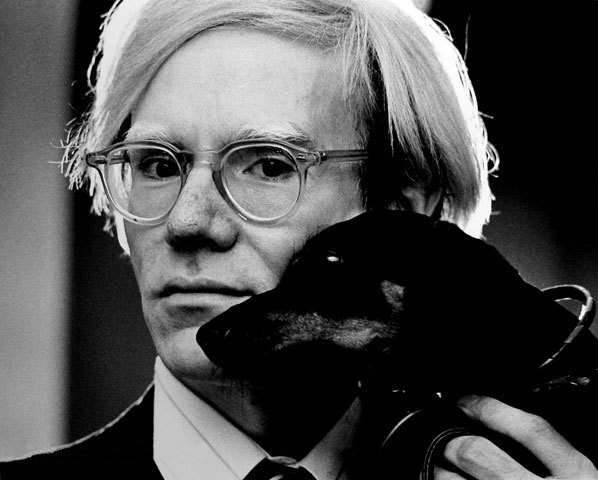
Andy Warhol

Metzger's second directorial effort, The Dirty Girls (shot in 1963 and released in 1965), marked his emergence as a major auteur in the pornographic film genre. His subsequent films were often shot in Europe and adapted from novels or other literary sources, including Carmen (by Prosper Mérimée), La Dame aux Camélias (by Alexandre Dumas), L'image (by Catherine Robbe-Grillet), Naked Came the Stranger (by Penelope Ashe), Pygmalion (by George Bernard Shaw), Six Characters in Search of an Author (by Luigi Pirandello), The Cat and the Canary (by John Willard), and Thérèse et Isabelle (by Violette Leduc). He cites John Farrow, Claude Lelouch, Michael Powell, Alain Resnais and Orson Welles as influencing his work. Metzger worked with the French film director Jean Renoir, as well as the American actor Hal Linden. Andy Warhol, who helped begin the Golden Age of Porn with his 1969 film Blue Movie, was a fan of Metzger's film work and commented that Metzger's 1970 film, The Lickerish Quartet, was “an outrageously kinky masterpiece”. In 1972, Metzger directed the film Score, based on an erotic off-Broadway play that included Sylvester Stallone. Films directed by Metzger included musical scores composed by Georges Auric, Stelvio Cipriani, Georges Delerue, and Piero Piccioni. Metzger's signature film style of his "elegant erotica" had developed into being "a Euro-centric combination of stylish decadence, wealth and the aristocratic".

Under the pseudonym "Henry Paris", Metzger directed several explicit pornographic features during the mid- to late-1970s. These films were released during the Golden Age of Porn (inaugurated by the 1969 release of Andy Warhol's Blue Movie) in the United States, at a time of "porno chic", in which pornographic films were just beginning to be widely released, publicly discussed by celebrities (like Johnny Carson and Bob Hope) and taken seriously by film critics (like Roger Ebert). Metzger's films are typified by high production values, especially The Private Afternoons of Pamela Mann (1975) and The Opening of Misty Beethoven (1976), and are generally critically celebrated. Some historians assess The Opening of Misty Beethoven, based on the play Pygmalion by George Bernard Shaw (and its derivative, My Fair Lady), as attaining a mainstream level in storyline and sets and is considered, by award-winning author Toni Bentley, the "crown jewel" of the Golden Age of Porn.

When I was coming of age, eroticism was always in films, but eroticism was punished. The promiscuous girl never got the leading man, the woman who sold her charms, always had a bad fate. The “good girl” always achieved ends the bad girl never did. As a reaction to that, I tried to do the opposite. You could have a free attitude and behave in a free way and not be punished. A parallel to that is that it could also be light. It didn’t have to be tragedy. You could look at [sex] in a fun way. That was a personal thing, to work against the clichés in cinema when I was growing up.

— Radley Metzger, January 8, 2014, "Interview: Radley Metzger, film director of Score (1974)"

Some of the pornographic "Henry Paris" films, including Score (1974), have also been presented in softcore versions. Many of Metzger's films, including Score (1974), The Image (1975), The Opening of Misty Beethoven (1976) and Barbara Broadcast (1977), as well as his earlier softcore films, Camille 2000 (1969) and The Lickerish Quartet (1970), have been released in Blu-ray versions.

With his 1978 feature The Cat and the Canary, Metzger distinguished himself as one of the few pornographic directors to direct a mainstream dramatic film. It starred Honor Blackman, Edward Fox, Dame Wendy Hiller and Carol Lynley.

== Later life ==
In the 1990s, as a result of the passing of his long-time partner, Ava Leighton, due to cancer, Metzger produced several videos on alternative health care, including one on cancer treatment and a five-part video series on homeopathy with Dr. Andrew Weil. According to Metzger: "I felt that in the 1990s, people needed more information on an intelligent approach to health and disease — that they needed to know about alleviating guilt. That was my emphasis."

Later in life, Metzger considered several "Henry Paris"-like film projects, including one titled Solarium, another one based on the book The Surrender by Toni Bentley, and a third one based on his own original script, using Shakespearean dialogue, tentatively titled The Heat of the Midnight Sun. However, all of these film projects were ultimately left unfinished.

According to film reviewer Adam Schartoff of Filmmaker Magazine in April 2017, Metzger was a "truly unique and exquisitely talented director", his films had "strong visuals and narratives ... whimsical, funny, intelligent and always ambitious stories", his treatment of female characters were "way beyond his time". Schartoff and a producing partner, Judith Mizrachy, considered making a documentary overview about Metzger and his films, but the project currently is unfinished.

Film and audio works by Metzger have been added to the permanent collection of the Museum of Modern Art (MoMA) in New York City.

== Death ==
Metzger died of undisclosed causes in New York City on Friday, March 31, 2017, at the age of 88.

== Awards (selected) ==
In 1977, Metzger's film The Opening of Misty Beethoven was the recipient of the first Adult Film Association of America awards for Best Direction (as Henry Paris), Best Film, and Best Actor (Jamie Gillis) and, as well, won the X-Caliber award for Best Direction (as Henry Paris).

In 2001, Metzger's film work was the subject of a retrospective in Boston, Massachusetts.

In 2002, Metzger's film The Opening of Misty Beethoven won Best Classic Release on DVD by the Adult Film Association of America.

In 2010, Metzger was also the recipient of a Lifetime Achievement Award from the Oldenburg International Film Festival, where he served as a judge in 2011.

In 2011, Metzger's film work was the subject of a retrospective at the UCLA Film and Television Archive.

In 2014, Metzger's film work was the subject of a retrospective at the Film Society of Lincoln Center.

== Partial filmography (director) ==
- Dark Odyssey (1961)
- La baie du désir (1964) (a.k.a. The Erotic Touch) (uncredited)
- Dictionary of Sex (1964)
- The Dirty Girls (1965)
- The Alley Cats (1966)
- Carmen, Baby (1967)
- Thérèse and Isabelle (1968)
- Camille 2000 (1969)
- The Lickerish Quartet (1970)
- Little Mother (1973) (a.k.a. Mother)
- Score (1974)
- The Private Afternoons of Pamela Mann (1974) (as Henry Paris)
- Naked Came the Stranger (1975) (as Henry Paris)
- The Image (1975) (a.k.a. L'image; The Punishment of Anne)
- The Opening of Misty Beethoven (1976) (as Henry Paris)
- Barbara Broadcast (1977) (as Henry Paris)
- Maraschino Cherry (1978) (as Henry Paris)
- The Cat and the Canary (1978)
- The Tale of Tiffany Lust (1979) (a.k.a. Body Lust) (uncredited)
- The World of Henry Paris (1981) (as Henry Paris)
- Aphrodesia's Diary (1983) (uncredited)
- The Princess and the Call Girl (1984)
- The Sins of Ilsa (1985) (unreleased)

== See also ==
- Andrew Blake
- Helmut Newton
- Michael Ninn
- Philip Mond
- Tinto Brass
