= Camera angle =

Element of cinematography

The camera angle marks the specific location at which the movie camera or video camera is placed to take a shot. A scene may be shot from several camera angles simultaneously. This will give a different experience and sometimes emotion. The different camera angles will have different effects on the viewer and how they perceive the scene that is shot. There are a few different routes that a camera operator could take to achieve this effect.

== Angles and their impact ==
Types of angles include the following:

- Extreme wide shot
- Very wide shot
- Wide shot
- Medium shot
- Two shot
- Medium close-up
- Close-up
- Extreme close-up

Where the camera is placed in relation to the subject can affect the way the viewer perceives the subject. Some of these many camera angles are the high-angle shot, low-angle shot, bird's-eye view, and worm's-eye view. A viewpoint is the apparent distance and angle from which the camera views and records the subject.

They also include the eye-level shot, over-the-shoulder shot, and point-of-view shot. A high-angle (HA) shot is a shot in which the camera is physically higher than the subject and is looking down upon the subject. The high angle shot can make the subject look small or weak or vulnerable while a low-angle (LA) shot is taken from below the subject and has the power to make the subject look powerful or threatening. A neutral shot or eye-level (EL) shot has little to no psychological effect on the viewer. This shot is when the camera is level or looking straight on with the subject.

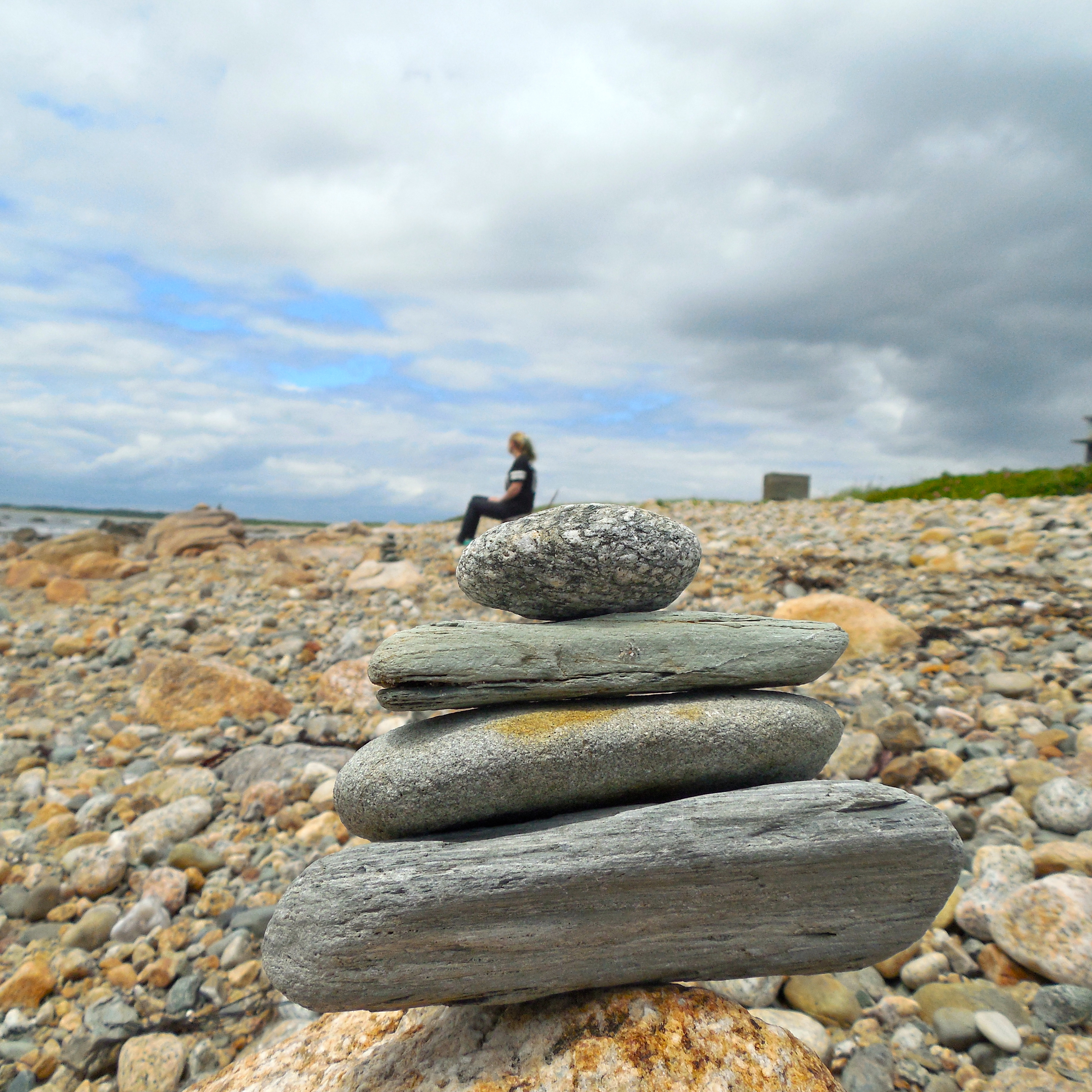
Low point of view camera angle employing a forced perspective technique

=== Point-of-view (POV) ===
A Point-of-view (POV) shot shows the viewer the image through the subject's eye. Some POV shots use hand-held cameras to create the illusion that the viewer is seeing through the subject's eyes.

=== Bird's-eye view ===
A bird’s-eye view shot is taken directly above the scene to establish the landscape and the actors relationship to it.

=== Worm's-eye view ===
A worm's-eye view shot looks up from the ground, and is meant to give the viewer the feeling that they are looking up at the character from way below and it is meant to show the view that a child or a pet would have. When considering the camera angle, one must remember that each shot is its own individual shot, and the camera angle should be taken in context of the scene and film.

=== Dutch angle ===
A dutch angle, also called a canted angle or even simply the tilted angle, is an angle in which the camera itself is tilted to the left or right. The unnatural angle evokes a feeling that the world is out of balance or psychological unrest in the viewer.

== Types of shots ==
There are many different types of shots that can be used from these angles. There are extreme long shots which are extremely far away from the subject and might not even show a person at all.

Extreme long shots are usually done in a high angle so the viewer can look down upon a setting or scene. Extreme longs shots are used mainly to open the scene or narrative and show the viewer the setting. The rest of the shots are most typically done in an eye level or point of view shot although it is possible to do any shot with any angle. There is the long shot which shows the subject even though the setting still dominates the picture frame.

Then, there is the medium long shot which makes the subject and the setting have equal importance and has the two about 50/50 in the frame. Then is the medium shot which emphasizes the character and is about a knees to waist up type shot. Then the medium close up is a shot that has the waist to the chest and up. The next closest shot is the close up which has the shoulders and up or maybe a little tighter on the head.

Finally, there is the extreme close up shot which has one body part usually. This can be an eye, a hand or anything else. These shots can be used with any of the aforementioned camera angles.

== Production techniques ==
During production and post-production, it is necessary to give a unique alphanumeric identity to each camera angle, labeled as "scenes." For example: "Scene 24C." Camera angle letters are often pronounced on the set using either the NATO phonetic alphabet or the older police-style radio alphabet. For example: "Scene 24C" would be pronounced as "Scene 24, Charlie." Some letters are avoided because they look like letters or numbers when written (for example an "S" can look like a "5").

== See also ==
- Anamorphosis
- Curvilinear perspective
- Cutaway drawing
- Desargues's theorem
- Filmmaking
- Optical illusion
- Perspective control
- Perspective (graphical)
- Perspective transform
- Projective geometry
- Reverse perspective
- Trompe-l'œil
- Video production
- Zograscope
