= Preference =

To like one thing more than another

In psychology, economics and philosophy, preference is a technical term usually used in relation to choosing between alternatives. For example, someone prefers A over B if they would rather choose A than B. Preferences are central to decision theory because of this relation to behavior. Some methods such as Ordinal Priority Approach use preference relation for decision-making. As connative states, they are closely related to desires. The difference between the two is that desires are directed at one object while preferences concern a comparison between two alternatives, of which one is preferred to the other.

In insolvency, the term is used to determine which outstanding obligation the insolvent party has to settle first.

== Psychology ==
In psychology, preferences refer to an individual's attitude towards a set of objects, typically reflected in an explicit decision-making process. The term is also used to mean evaluative judgment in the sense of liking or disliking an object, as in Scherer (2005), which is the most typical definition employed in psychology. It does not mean that a preference is necessarily stable over time. Preference can be notably modified by decision-making processes, such as choices, even unconsciously. Consequently, preference can be affected by a person's surroundings and upbringing in terms of geographical location, cultural background, religious beliefs, and education. These factors are found to affect preference as repeated exposure to a certain idea or concept correlates with a positive preference.

== Economics ==
In economics and other social sciences, preference refers to the set of assumptions related to ordering some alternatives, based on the degree of happiness, satisfaction, gratification, morality, enjoyment, or utility they provide. The concept of preferences is used in post-World War II neoclassical economics to provide observable evidence in relation to people's actions. These actions can be described by Rational Choice Theory, where individuals make decisions based on rational preferences which are aligned with their self-interests in order to achieve an optimal outcome.

Consumer preference, or consumers' preference for particular brands over identical products and services, is an important notion in the psychological influence of consumption. Consumer preferences have three properties: completeness, transitivity and non-satiation. For a preference to be rational, it must satisfy the axioms of transitivity and Completeness (statistics). The first axiom of transitivity refers to consistency between preferences, such that if x is preferred to y and y is preferred to z, then x has to be preferred to z. The second axiom of completeness describes that a relationship must exist between two options, such that x must be preferred to y or y must be preferred to x, or is indifferent between them. For example, if I prefer sugar to honey and honey to sweetener then I must prefer sugar to sweetener to satisfy transitivity and I must have a preference between the items to satisfy completeness. Under the axiom of completeness, an individual cannot lack a preference between any two options.

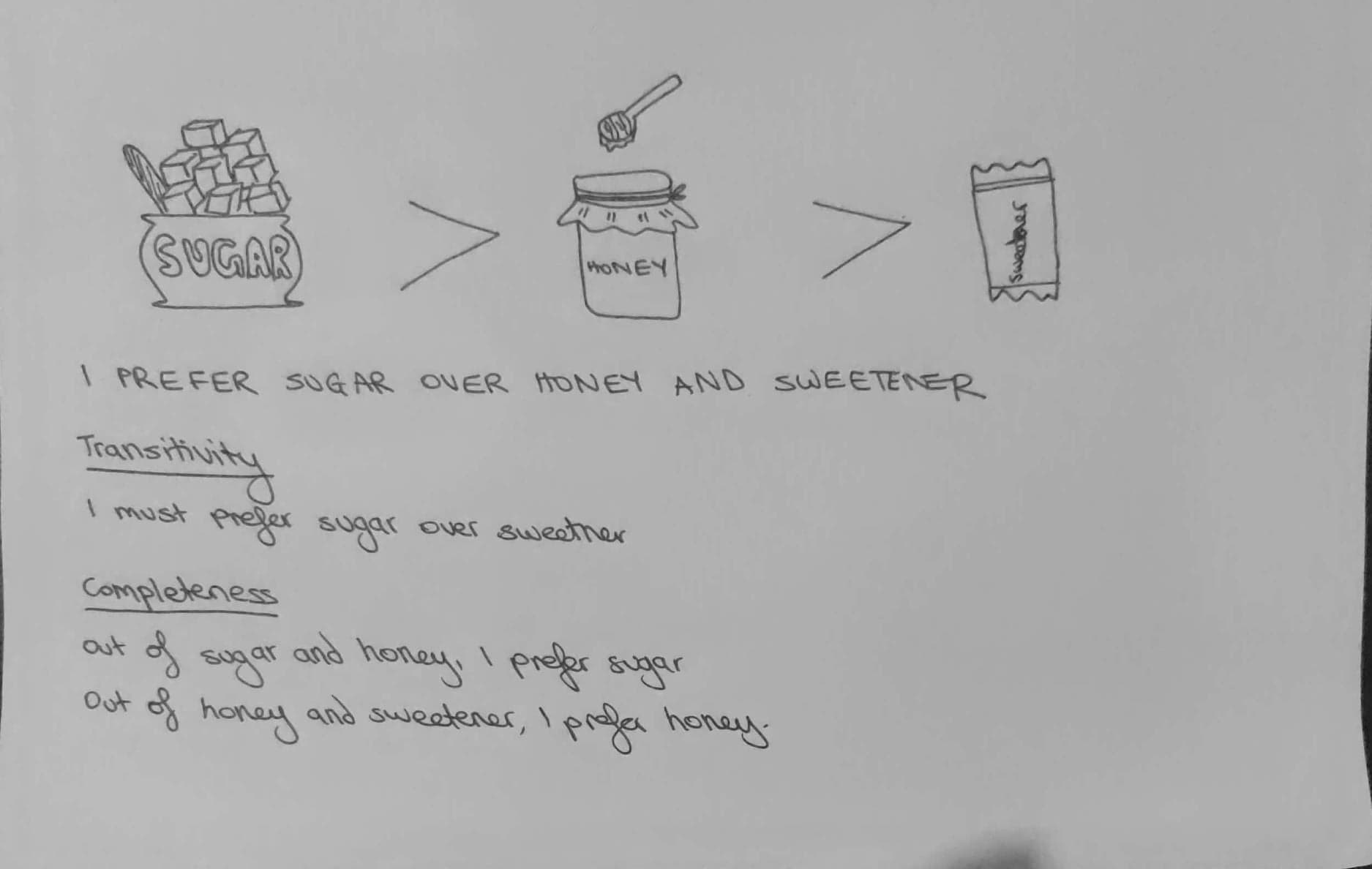
An example of transitive and complete preferences.

If preferences are both transitive and complete, the relationship between preference can be described by a utility function. This is because the axioms allow for preferences to be ordered into one equivalent ordering with no preference cycles. Maximising utility does not imply maximise happiness, rather it is an optimisation of the available options based on an individual's preferences. The so-called Expected Utility Theory (EUT), which was introduced by John von Neumann and Oskar Morgenstern in 1944, explains that so long as an agent's preferences over risky options follow a set of axioms, then he is maximizing the expected value of a utility function. In utility theory, preference relates to decision makers' attitudes towards rewards and hazards. The specific varieties are classified into three categories: 1) risk-averse, that is, equal gains and losses, with investors participating when the loss probability is less than 50%; 2) the risk-taking kind, which is the polar opposite of type 1); 3) Relatively risk-neutral, in the sense that the introduction of risk has no clear association with the decision maker's choice.

The mathematical foundations of most common types of preferences — that are representable by quadratic or additive functions — laid down by Gérard Debreu enabled Andranik Tangian to develop methods for their elicitation. In particular, additive and quadratic preference functions in $n$ variables can be constructed from interviews, where questions are aimed at tracing totally $n$ 2D-indifference curves in $n - 1$ coordinate planes without referring to cardinal utility estimates.

Empirical evidence has shown that the usage of rational preferences (and Rational Choice Theory) does not always accurately predict human behaviour because it makes unrealistic assumptions. In response to this, neoclassical economists argue that it provides a normative model for people to adjust and optimise their actions. Behavioural economics describes an alternative approach to predicting human behaviour by using psychological theory which explores deviations from rational preferences and the standard economic model. It also recognises that rational preferences and choices are limited by heuristics and biases. Heuristics are rules of thumb such as elimination by aspects which are used to make decisions rather than maximising the utility function. Economic biases such as reference points and loss aversion also violate the assumption of rational preferences by causing individuals to act irrationally.

Individual preferences can be represented as an indifference curve given the underlying assumptions. Indifference curves graphically depict all product combinations that yield the same amount of usefulness. Indifference curves allow us to graphically define and rank all possible combinations of two commodities.

The graph's three main points are:

1. If more is better, the indifference curve dips downward.
2. Greater transitivity indicates that the indifference curves do not overlap.
3. A propensity for diversity causes indifference curves to curve inward.

== Risk preference ==
Risk preference is defined as how much risk a person is prepared to accept based on the expected utility or pleasure of the outcome.

Risk tolerance is a critical component of personal financial planning, that is, risk preference.

In psychology, risk preference is occasionally characterised as the proclivity to engage in a behaviour or activity that is advantageous but may involve some potential loss, such as substance abuse or criminal action that may bring significant bodily and mental harm to the individual.

In economics, risk preference refers to a proclivity to engage in behaviours or activities that entail greater variance returns, regardless of whether they be gains or losses, and are frequently associated with monetary rewards involving lotteries.

There are two different traditions of measuring preference for risk, the revealed and stated preference traditions, which coexist in psychology, and to some extent in economics as well.

Risk preference evaluated from stated preferences emerges as a concept with significant temporal stability, but revealed preference measures do not.

== Relation to desires ==
Preferences and desires are two closely related notions: they are both conative states that determine our behavior. The difference between the two is that desires are directed at one object while preferences concern a comparison between two alternatives, of which one is preferred to the other. The focus on preferences instead of desires is very common in the field of decision theory. It has been argued that desire is the more fundamental notion and that preferences are to be defined in terms of desires. For this to work, desire has to be understood as involving a degree or intensity. Given this assumption, a preference can be defined as a comparison of two desires. That Nadia prefers tea over coffee, for example, just means that her desire for tea is stronger than her desire for coffee. One argument for this approach is due to considerations of parsimony: a great number of preferences can be derived from a very small number of desires. One objection to this theory is that our introspective access is much more immediate in cases of preferences than in cases of desires. So it is usually much easier for us to know which of two options we prefer than to know the degree with which we desire a particular object. This consideration has been used to suggest that maybe preference, and not desire, is the more fundamental notion.

== Insolvency ==
In insolvency, the term can be used to describe when a company pays a specific creditor or group of creditors. From doing this, that creditor(s) is made better off, than other creditors. After paying the 'preferred creditor', the company seeks to go into formal insolvency like an administration or liquidation. There must be a desire to make the creditor better off, for them to be a preference. If the preference is proven, legal action can occur. It is a wrongful act of trading. Disqualification is a risk. Preference arises within the context of the principle maintaining that one of the main objectives in the winding up of an insolvent company is to ensure the equal treatment of creditors. The rules on preferences allow paying up their creditors as insolvency looms, but that it must prove that the transaction is a result of ordinary commercial considerations. Also, under the English Insolvency Act 1986, if a creditor was proven to have forced the company to pay, the resulting payment would not be considered a preference since it would not constitute unfairness. It is the decision to give a preference, rather than the giving of the preference pursuant to that decision, which must be influenced by the desire to produce the effect of the preference. For these purposes, therefore, the relevant time is the date of the decision, not the date of giving the preference.

== See also ==
- Motivation
- Ordinal Priority Approach
- Preference-based planning (in artificial intelligence)
- Preference revelation
- Choice
- Pairwise comparison
