= Goodfellas (soundtrack) =

Goodfellas Music from the Motion Picture

Soundtrack album by Various Artists
- Released: October 9, 1990
- Genre: Soundtrack
- Length: 38:01
- Label: Atlantic / WEA

Professional ratings
Review scores
Source	Rating
Allmusic	link

Goodfellas Music from the Motion Picture is the soundtrack for the 1990 film Goodfellas, directed by Martin Scorsese, notable for its use of popular music from the various periods it portrayed. In a similar manner to American Graffiti and Scorsese's earlier Mean Streets, the songs served roughly the same purpose as a composed musical score. While an official soundtrack was released at the same time as the film, it only featured a small fraction of the songs used.

Scorsese chose the songs for Goodfellas only if they commented on the scene or the characters "in an oblique way". The only rule he adhered to with the soundtrack was to only use music which could have been heard at that time, deciding that he could use any song released before the scene in which it played took place.

According to Scorsese, a lot of non-dialogue scenes were shot to playback. For example, he had "Layla" playing on the set while shooting the scene where the dead bodies are discovered in the car and the meat-truck. Sometimes, the lyrics of songs were put between lines of dialogue to comment on the action.

Some of the music Scorsese had written into the script while other songs he discovered during the editing phase. There is no music once Henry is arrested in his driveway by the DEA, until the end credits.

== Track listing ==
Songs on the movie's soundtrack CD:

No.	Title	Writer(s)	Artist(s)	Length
1.	"Rags to Riches"	Richard Adler; Jerry Ross	Tony Bennett	2:51
2.	"Sincerely"	Harvey Fuqua; Alan Freed	The Moonglows	3:08
3.	"Speedoo"	Esther Navarro	The Cadillacs	2:24
4.	"Stardust"	Hoagy Carmichael; Mitchell Parish	Billy Ward and His Dominoes	3:14
5.	"Look in My Eyes"	Richie Barrett	The Chantels	2:20
6.	"Life Is but a Dream"	Hy Weiss; Raoul Cita	The Harptones	2:43
7.	"Remember (Walking in the Sand)"	Shadow Morton	The Shangri-Las	2:18
8.	"Baby I Love You"	Ronnie Shannon	Aretha Franklin	2:38
9.	"Beyond the Sea"	Charles Trenet; Jack Lawrence	Bobby Darin	2:55
10.	"Sunshine of Your Love"	Jack Bruce; Eric Clapton; Pete Brown	Cream	4:13
11.	"Mannish Boy"	Muddy Waters; Mel London; Bo Diddley	Muddy Waters	5:24
12.	"Layla"	Eric Clapton; Jim Gordon	Derek and the Dominos	3:53
Total length:				38:01

== Complete song list ==
Songs used in the movie in chronological order:

- "Rags to Riches" by Tony Bennett – Opening credits, opening narration.
- "Can't We Be Sweethearts" by The Cleftones – Young Henry is parking Cadillacs; Henry gets whipped by his father.
- "Hearts of Stone" by Otis Williams and the Charms – Henry's mailman is threatened.
- "Sincerely" by The Moonglows – The wiseguy get-together (cookout) at Paulie's home.
- "Firenze Sogna" by Giuseppe Di Stefano – New suit; Shooting victim (Wasting aprons).
- "Speedoo" by The Cadillacs – Kid Henry, the sandwich boy; Jimmy Conway is first introduced.
- "Parlami d'amore Mariu" by Giuseppe Di Stefano – Young Henry gets pinched for selling cigarettes.
- "Stardust" by Billy Ward and His Dominoes – Idlewild Airport 1963; First appearance of the grown-up Henry Hill; Truck hijacking.
- "This World We Love In (Il Cielo In Una Stanza)" by Mina – In the Bamboo Lounge; Mobsters are introduced; Air France heist is planned.
- "Playboy" by The Marvelettes – Bamboo Lounge bust-out – Henry and Tommy burn the restaurant.
- "It's Not for Me to Say" by Johnny Mathis – The double date; Karen is introduced, and ignored by Henry.
- "Chariot" by Betty Curtis – Karen is stood-up, and loudly confronts Henry in the street.
- "Then He Kissed Me" by The Crystals – Henry and Karen enter the Copacabana from the rear.
- "Look in My Eyes" by The Chantels – The Air France heist; Paulie gets his cut.
- "Roses Are Red" by Bobby Vinton – Henry and Karen at the beach resort; Receiving champagne from Bobby Vinton at the Copa.
- "Life Is But a Dream" by The Harptones – Henry and Karen's wedding and reception.
- "Leader of the Pack" by The Shangri-Las – The hostess party.
- "Toot, Toot, Tootsie Goodbye" by Al Jolson (clip from The Jazz Singer) – NYPD detectives are searching the Hills' house.
- "Happy Birthday to You" – Sung by family members at Little Jimmy's birthday party during Karen's narration – Mob life montage/no outsiders.
- "Ain't That a Kick in the Head?" by Dean Martin – Narration continues – Mob life montage.
- "He's Sure the Boy I Love" by The Crystals – Billy Batts is introduced at the Suite Lounge; "Shinebox" insult.
- "Atlantis" by Donovan – Billy Batts is beaten down and kicked by Tommy and Jimmy.
- "Pretend You Don't See Her" by Jerry Vale – Friday night at the Copa with the girlfriends; Sunday dinner at Paulie's.
- "Remember (Walking in the Sand)" by The Shangri-Las – Henry with Janice at the Suite before digging up Billy Batts's body.
- "Baby I Love You" by Aretha Franklin – Janice Rossi's apartment; She shows her girlfriends around; Spider is introduced at a poker game.
- "Firenze Sogna" by Giuseppe Di Stefano – (2nd time played) Another poker game; Tommy kills Spider.
- "Beyond the Sea" by Bobby Darin – Prison life/dinner; Henry begins selling drugs.
- "Boulevard of Broken Dreams" Performed by Tony Bennett – Dinner at Paulie's house after Henry is paroled.
- "Gimme Shelter" by The Rolling Stones – Henry cutting cocaine at Sandy's place; Brings in Jimmy and Tommy at the parole office.
- "Wives and Lovers" by Jack Jones – Karen shows off the new house/furniture to Belle; Morrie pitches the Lufthansa heist to Henry.
- "Monkey Man" by The Rolling Stones – The babysitter, Lois Byrd (with baby) is introduced; Henry again at Sandy's place mixing the coke.
- "Frosty the Snowman" by The Ronettes – Henry arrives at the Christmas party; Jimmy chews out Johnny Roastbeef for the Cadillac.
- "Christmas (Baby Please Come Home)" by Darlene Love – Jimmy chews out Frankie Carbone for the mink; Morrie pesters Jimmy for his share of the Lufthansa heist.
- "Bells of St. Marys" by The Drifters – Henry Hill's Christmas tree; The execution of Stacks Edwards.
- "Unchained Melody" by Vito and The Salutations – In the bar, Henry is worried about Stacks; Tommy thinks he's being "made"; Morrie again pesters Jimmy.
- "Danny Boy" – Morrie sings it to Henry, then to himself, as he leaves the bar after his failed attempt to talk to Jimmy.
- "Sunshine of Your Love" by Cream – Jimmy contemplates killing Morrie and other members of his crew.
- "Layla (Piano Exit)" by Derek and The Dominos – Dead bodies are being discovered all over the city; Tommy is executed.
- "Jump into the Fire" by Harry Nilsson – The beginning of the "May 11, 1980 – 6:55 AM" helicopter sequence; Delivering guns to Jimmy.
- "Memo from Turner" by Mick Jagger (incorrectly credited to the Rolling Stones) – Henry leaves Jimmy's with the unwanted guns.
- "Magic Bus" by The Who (Live at Leeds version) – Frantic, intoxicated driving; Henry almost has a car accident.
- "Jump into the Fire" by Harry Nilsson – (2nd time played) Henry drives his brother home from the hospital; Starting dinner; More helicopters.
- "Monkey Man" by The Rolling Stones – (2nd time played) More frantic driving; Henry and Karen hide the guns at Karen's mother's house.
- "What Is Life" by George Harrison – More frantic driving; Pick up guns again; Visit to the cocaine connection; Call from Sandy; Call to Lois; Lois calls from an inside line.
- "Mannish Boy" by Muddy Waters – Last time at Sandy's place, mixing the coke; Dinner at the Hill's with children, Lois, and brother Michael.
- "Jump into the Fire" by Harry Nilsson – (3rd time played) The drum solo of the song is played immediately before Henry is arrested in his driveway.
- "My Way" by Sid Vicious – End credits.
- "Layla (Piano Exit)" by Derek and The Dominos – (2nd time played) second song in the end credits.
