= Doo Wop 50 =

Television program and fundraiser

Doo Wop 50 is a television and DVD special created and produced by TJ Lubinsky. The special was inspired by a 1994 CD box-set of doo wop music which was also a development and production partner WQED in the program and dvd. It aired in December 1999.

Doo Wop 50 was videotaped live at The Benedum Center For The Performing Arts, Pittsburgh, Pennsylvania on May 11 & 12, 1999. It showcased many doo-wop groups that had existed since the 1950s, and was hosted by former Impressions lead and soul soloist Jerry Butler. It was followed by Doo Wop 51 and the American Soundtrack and My Music series as seen on public television. Doo Wop 50 became the highest-producing pledge drive special in the history of PBS at that time, garnering more than $75 million for its member stations.

The American Soundtrack/My Music series has become a mainstay for public television stations, Lubinsky owns the copyright to the special and the American Soundtrack/My Music series.

== Groups on the program ==
=== Part One ===
Herb Reed's Platters

- "Only You"
- "The Great Pretender"

Norman Wright's Dell Vikings

- "Come Go with Me"

The Skyliners

- "This I Swear"
- "Since I Don't Have You"

The Penguins

- "Earth Angel"

Gene Chandler with Pure Gold

- "Duke of Earl"

Johnny Maestro & the Brooklyn Bridge

- "Sixteen Candles"
- "Worst That Could Happen"

Lee Andrews & the Hearts

- "Long Lonely Nights"

The Cleftones

- "Little Girl of Mine"
- "Heart and Soul"

The Capris

- "There's a Moon Out Tonight"

The Marcels

- "Blue Moon"

The Jive Five

- "My True Story"
- "What Time Is It?"

The Legends of Doo Wop

- "Just to Be with You"
- "Oh Rosemarie"
- "Guardian Angel"

Earl Lewis and The Channels

- "That's My Desire"
- "The Closer You Are"

=== Part Two ===
The Cadillacs

- "Zoom"
- "Gloria (Leon René song)"
- "Speedoo"

The Golden Group Memories

- "Unchained Melody"
- "Sorry (I Ran All the Way Home)"

The Chantels

- "Look at My Eyes"

The Chantels featuring Arlene Smith

- "Maybe"

The Moonglows featuring Harvey Fuqua

- "Sincerely"
- "Ten Commandments of Love"

Jerry Butler

- "For Your Precious Love"

The Harptones

- "Sunday Kind of Love"
- "Life Is but a Dream"

The Flamingos

- "I Only Have Eyes for You"
- "Lovers Never Say Goodbye"

The Channels, The Legends of Doo Wop, The Golden Group Memories, The Cadillacs

- "Gloria Medley"

The Spaniels

- "Stormy Weather"
- "Goodnight, Sweetheart, Goodnight"

== See also ==
- Official WQED website for the American Soundtrack series
