= The Valentines (doo-wop band) =

Former American doo-wop group

- Also known as: The Mistletoes, The Dreamers
- Origin: Sugar Hill, Manhattan
- Genres: Doo-wop
- Years active: 1952–1958
- Label: Rama Records
- Past members: Raymond "Pop" Briggs (first tenor); Carl Hogan (second tenor); Mickey Francis (baritone); Ronnie Bright (bass); Richard Barrett (lead vocalist); Donald Razor (second tenor); Eddie Edgehill (second tenor); Dave "Baby" Cortez (first tenor)

The Valentines were an American doo-wop group in the 1950s. They were one of the most highly regarded American doo-wop groups from the mid-1950s.

Although they never had a record on the national hit parades, they were popular in New York and the East Coast in general and had many regional big sellers. The stage performances of the group were sellouts and their harmonizing and choreography in sequence were amongst the most accomplished of their time. Influenced both musically and in their showmanship by The Cadillacs, The Solitaires, and The Flamingos, The Valentines were able to contribute towards stage presentation, vocals, and some unique performances.

The Valentines served as a launching pad for important careers.

== Early days ==
The group first formed in 1952 in the Sugar Hill district of Harlem as a quartet, harmonizing on the corner of 151st Street and Amsterdam Avenue. The original group comprised Raymond "Pop" Briggs (first tenor), Carl Hogan (second tenor), Mickey Francis (baritone), and Ronnie Bright (bass) calling themselves The Mistletoes; sometime afterwards they changed their names to The Dreamers.

== The quintet ==
While performing at a house party in 1954 they met a young singer-songwriter named Richard Barrett from Philadelphia who had sung with a group called The Angels (on Grand). An alternative version given by Phil Groia, in They All Sang on the Corner, states that the group actually met Barrett while he was serenading lovers in a park with his ukulele. Barrett was invited to join the group because they wanted his song "Summer Love", and Barrett's distinctive lead vocals. The original tone of his voice gave the Valentines a sound that is still appreciated today. Now a quintet, The Dreamers adopted the name, The Valentines, taken from the title of Mickey Francis' favorite song "My Funny Valentine". At this point their friend Raoul Cita of The Harptones brought them to Monte Bruce of Bruce Records where they did a "Summer Love" demo. Although DJ and unofficial mayor of Harlem Willie Bryant played the tape on local radio station WOV for a month, Bruce never issued it or recorded the group again. At this time, before the arrival of Alan Freed, New York Rhythm and Blues radio was dominated by Tommy ("Dr Jive") Smalls on WWRL.

The group did not have a contract with Bruce and when they came to the attention of Hy Weiss of Old Town Records he was able to sign them. Donald Razor from The Velvets (on Red Robin) came in to replace Hogan who was proving unreliable. In December 1954, Weiss issued the superb Barrett-penned love song "Tonight Kathleen", backed with a re-cut of "Summer Love". Although popular locally, this ballad did not chart due to Old Town's poor distribution at this early time in their trading, and it has become a very rare record. Following this disappointment the group concentrated on their stage-work and built on their popularity.

In mid-1955, Eddie Edgehill replaced Donald Razor as second tenor and the group moved to George Goldner's Rama label where they issued the chime-harmonized rocker "Lily Maebelle" in September. In all probability Barrett and Briggs wrote the song about Pop Brigg's sister Lil. This recording was punctuated by Jimmy Wright's energetic sax break, which was a common feature of many recordings on Goldner's labels, Rama and Gee. The recording became an East Coast favorite and the group made many appearances on Alan Freed shows at the Academy of Music and Brooklyn Paramount. They also performed at the Apollo, Howard, and Royal Theatres, and with shows hosted by other famous DJs of the time, Hal Jackson and Jocko Henderson. At this point the group began appearing on stage with what was to become their trademark - white jackets with red cloth hearts ("valentines") on the pockets, red shirts and pink bowties.

Their next releases were "I Love You Darling" followed by the holiday ballad "Christmas Prayer". In April 1956 came their biggest hit, "The Woo Woo Train".

Marv Goldberg maintains that George Goldner had the Valentines sing backup on The Wrens' "C'est La Vie", at the "Woo Woo" session, because only Bobby Mansfield and George Magnezid of the Wrens had shown up to record "C'est La Vie" that day. The Valentines were not credited. Music historians Charlie and Pam Horner repeat this claim. If true, that would put seven voices on that song. Mitch Rosalsky disputes this claim. Marv Goldberg's article is based on an interview with Ronnie Bright in 1977. Rosalsky, however, bases his evidence on the memory of The Wrens' Bobby Mansfield in 2000.

The ballads "Twenty Minutes (Before the Hour)" and "Natures Creation" followed, but were not widely appreciated at the time. At the group's final session, Carl Hogan returned to replace Eddie Edgehill, and David Clowney from The Pearls (on Onyx) took Raymond Briggs' place. Another ballad, "Don't Say Goodnight", was cut but had little sales success.

== Disbanding ==
The group decided to disband in 1958 after one final appearance at the Apollo Theater, due to a combination of disillusionment with poor promotion on the part of the Rama label and the desire of Richard Barrett to turn to management and production. Barrett became manager of Frankie Lymon and The Teenagers and discovered The Chantels. He became A&R Director for Goldner's End and Gone labels and recorded acts including The Teenagers, The Chantels, Little Anthony and The Imperials, and later The Three Degrees.

Carl Hogan went on to sing with The Miracles on Fury (not the Smokey Robinson group on End and Tamla) and co-wrote many hits with Richard Barrett. David Clowney became Dave "Baby" Cortez and had the number-one popular hit "The Happy Organ" in 1959, as well as performing with many doo-wop groups such as The Jesters and The Paragons. Bass Ronnie Bright sang with The Cadillacs for a while, and then became a studio vocalist. He was Johnny Cymbal’s "Mr. Bass Man" on the 1963 hit of the same name. He then sang for The Deep River Boys and Carl Gardner's Coasters.

== Discography ==
- 1954 "Tonight Kathleen"/"Summer Love" (Old Town 1009)
- 1955 "Lily Maebelle"/"Falling For You" (Rama 171)
- 1955 "I Love You Darling"/Hand Me Down Love" (Rama 181)
- 1955 "A Christmas Prayer"/"Kiss Me" (Rama 186)
- 1956 "C’est La Vie"/"C’est La Vie" With the Wrens (not credited) (Rama 194)
- 1956 "The Woo Woo Train"/"Why" (Rama 196)
- 1956 "20 Minutes Before the Hour"/"I’ll Never Let You Go" (Rama 201)
- 1956 "Nature's Creation"/"My Story of Love" (Rama 208)
- 1957 "Don’t Say Goodnight"/"I Cried Oh Oh" (Rama 228)

The Jimmy Wright Orchestra played on the Rama sessions.

Most of The Valentines' material can be found on the Murray Hill or Collectables LPs. The Collectables CD from 1991 is the same as the LP and contains all the issued material except "Tonight Kathleen", "Summer Love", "A Christmas Prayer" and "I Cried Oh Oh". Old Town Doo Wop CD Vol. 1 has "Tonight Kathleen" and the Rhino Doo Wop boxed sets contain "Lily Maebelle" (Box 1), "The Woo Woo Train" (Box 2) and "Don’t Say Goodnight" (Box 3). The 2005 Collectables release titled Lily Maebelle contains ten songs by the group.
