= Speedo (disambiguation) =

Speedo may refer to:

- Speedo International Limited, a swimsuit manufacturer
- Swim briefs, sometimes referred to as "Speedos" regardless of the manufacturer
- Bitstream Speedo Fonts, a typeface
- "Speedoo", 1955 song recorded by The Cadillacs, also known as "Speedo"
- Earl Carroll (vocalist) (1937–2012), also known as "Speedo"
- Gary Speed (1969–2011), Welsh footballer and manager, nicknamed "Speedo"
- Ryan Speedo Green (born 1986), American bass-baritone opera singer
- Mackerel scad, a wide-ranging species of scad
- Slang term for the Speed Up round on Wheel of Fortune (American game show)

== See also ==
- Speedometer, the speed gauge in motor vehicles
