= Lenny Welch =

American MOR and pop singer (1938–2025)

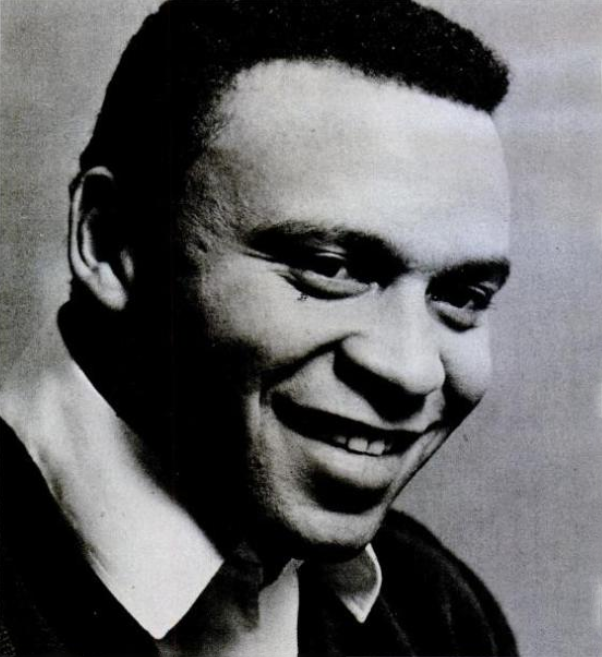
- Welch in 1965

Background information
- Born: Leon Welch; May 31, 1938; New York City, U.S.
- Origin: Asbury Park, New Jersey, U.S.
- Died: April 8, 2025 (aged 86) Kissimmee, Florida, U.S.
- Genres: Pop
- Occupation: Singer
- Instrument: Vocals
- Years active: 1954–2020
- Labels: Decca Records, Cadence Records, Kapp Records, Columbia Records, Mercury Records, Commonwealth United Records, Roulette Records, Atco Records, Mainstream Records, Big Tree Records
- Website: www.lennywelch.com

Leon "Lenny" Welch (May 31, 1938 – April 8, 2025) was an American MOR and pop singer.

== Early life ==
Welch was born on May 31, 1938 in New York City, and raised in Asbury Park, New Jersey, by his godparents, Eva and Robert Richardson. He attended Asbury Park High School. When he was 16 years old, Welch joined a local Asbury Park vocal group called The Mar-Keys (not to be confused with the Stax records studio band The Mar-Keys).

== Career ==
In 1960, Welch signed with Cadence Records. His biggest hit, a cover version of the big band standard "Since I Fell for You," reached number 4 on U.S. Billboard Hot 100 in 1963, selling a million copies. Other hits included covers of “You Don’t Know Me” (1960) and "Ebb Tide" (1964). He released the first single with the vocal version of “A Taste of Honey" in 1962 and performed the theme to the 1967 CBS TV series Coronet Blue. Welch reimagined Neil Sedaka's "Breaking Up is Hard to Do" as a torch song, which became a Top 40 hit in 1970; Sedaka re-recorded the song in Welch's style for a Top 10 hit in 1975.

== Later life and death ==
After Welch's recording career ended, he resumed his education, attending night school after driving a taxicab during the day. He first achieved a high school equivalency degree, then graduated from the College of New Rochelle with a bachelor's degree. He also began singing for commercials, first for Subaru and later for products that included Coca-Cola, M&M's, and Mini-Oreos.

From 1990 to 1991, Welch joined The Royal All Stars (The Doo Wop All Stars), first of the "supergroups" to be formed bringing together singers from different groups to perform. This group consisted of Welch, Vito Balsamo from Vito & the Salutations, Artie Loria from The Earls, Randy Silverman from The Impalas and Eugene Pitt from The Jive Five. They became a mainstay in the "doo wop" circuit and toured relentlessly in the following years. Welch ended his touring career in 2020 because of COVID-19 shutdowns.

Welch died following a long illness in Kissimmee, Florida, on April 8, 2025, at the age of 86.

== Discography ==
=== Studio albums ===
- Since I Fell for You (1963) (US No. 73)
- Two Different Worlds (1965)
- Rags to Riches (1966)
- Lenny (1967)
- It's All About Love (2005)

=== Compilation albums ===
- Anthology (1958-1966) (1996)

=== Singles ===
Year	Titles (A-side, B-side) Both tracks from the same album except where indicated	Chart positions				Album
Year	Titles (A-side, B-side) Both tracks from the same album except where indicated	US Billboard Hot 100	US AC	US Billboard R&B chart	CAN CHUM RPM	Album
1958	"My One Sincere" b/w "Rocket To The Moon"	—	—	—	—	Non-album tracks
1959	"The Blessing Of Love" b/w "The Last Star Of Evening"	—	—	—	—	Non-album tracks
1960	"You Don’t Know Me" b/w "I Need Someone"	45	—	28	37	Since I Fell For You
1960	"Darlin'" b/w "Three-Handed Woman" (Non-album track)	—	—	—	—	Since I Fell For You
1960	"Darlin'" b/w "I'd Like To Know" (Non-album track)	—	—	—	—	Since I Fell For You
1961	"Changa Rock" b/w "Boogie Cha Cha"	—	—	—	—	Non-album tracks
1962	"It's Just Not That Easy" b/w "Mama, Don't You Hit That Boy"	—	—	—	—	Since I Fell For You
1962	"A Taste Of Honey" b/w "The Old Cathedral" (Non-album track)	—	—	—	—	Since I Fell For You
1963	"Since I Fell For You" b/w "Are You Sincere"	4	3	—	19	Since I Fell For You
1964	"Ebb Tide" b/w "Congratulations, Baby" (Non-album track)	25	6	7	14	Since I Fell For You
1964	"If You See My Love" b/w "Father Sebastian"	92	—	43	—	Non-album tracks
1965	"I'm Dreaming Again" b/w "My Fool Of A Heart"	—	—	—	—	Two Different Worlds
1965	"Darling Take Me Back" b/w "Time After Time"	72	23	—	—	Two Different Worlds
1965	"Two Different Worlds" b/w "I Was There"	61	6	—	26	Two Different Worlds
1965	"Run To My Loving Arms" b/w "Coronet Blue"	96	—	—	—	Two Different Worlds
1966	"Rags to Riches" b/w "I Want You To Worry (About Me)"	102	—	—	—	Rags To Riches
1966	"What Now My Love" b/w "You're Gonna Hear From Me"	—	—	—	—	Rags To Riches
1966	"Just One Smile" b/w "Please Help Me I'm Falling"	—	—	—	—	Rags To Riches
1966	"If You Love Me, Really Love Me" b/w "Once Before I Die" (Non-album track)	—	—	—	—	Lenny!
1967	"I'm Over You" b/w "Coronet Blue" (from Two Different Worlds)	—	—	—	—	Lenny!
1967	"Since I Fell For You" b/w "A Taste Of Honey"; Re-release	134	—	—	—	Since I Fell For You
1967	"The Right To Cry" b/w "Until The Real Thing Comes Along"	128	—	—	—	Lenny!
1967	"Love Doesn't Live Here" b/w "Let's Start All Over Again"	—	—	—	—	Lenny!
1968	"Darling Stay With Me" b/w "Wait Awhile Longer"	112	—	—	—	Non-album tracks
1968	"Tennessee Waltz" b/w "He Who Loves"	—	—	—	—	Non-album tracks
1968	"Halfway To Your Arms" b/w "You Can't Run Away (From Your Own True Feelings)"	—	—	—	—	Non-album tracks
1970	"Breaking Up Is Hard To Do" b/w "Get Mommy To Come Back Home"	34	8	27	23	Non-album tracks
1970	"To Be Loved/Glory of Love" b/w "My Heart Won't Let Me"	110	—	—	—	Non-album tracks
1970	"Such A Night" b/w "I'm Sorry"	—	—	—	—	Non-album tracks
1972	"A Sunday Kind Of Love" b/w "I Wish You Could Know Me (Naomi)"	96	21	—	—	Non-album tracks
1973	"Goodnight My Love" b/w "Fancy Meeting You Here, Baby"	—	—	—	—	Non-album tracks
1973	"Since I Don't Have You" b/w "Right In The Next Room"	—	25	92	—	Non-album tracks
1974	"Eyewitness News" b/w "I Need You More (Than Ever Now)"	—	—	71	—	Non-album tracks
1974	"A Hundred Pounds Of Pain" b/w "The Iguana"	—	—	—	—	Non-album tracks
1974	"When There's No Such Thing As Love (It's Over)" b/w "The Minx"	—	—	—	—	Non-album tracks
1977	"Six Million Dollar Woman" b/w "I Thank You Love"	—	—	—	—	Non-album tracks
