= Bronx Walk of Fame =

- Location within New York City Location within New York
- Established: 1997
- Location: Grand Concourse from 138th Street to East 161st Street, The Bronx, New York, U.S.
- Coordinates: 40°49′36″N 73°55′22″W
- Type: Hall of Fame
- Founder: Fernando Ferrer
- Owners: Bronx borough president, Bronx Tourism Council
- Public transit access: New York City Subway (149th Street), (138th and 149th Streets), (138th and 149th Streets), (161st Street), (161st Street)
- Parking: Street parking and nearby private garages
- Website: bronxwalkoffame.com

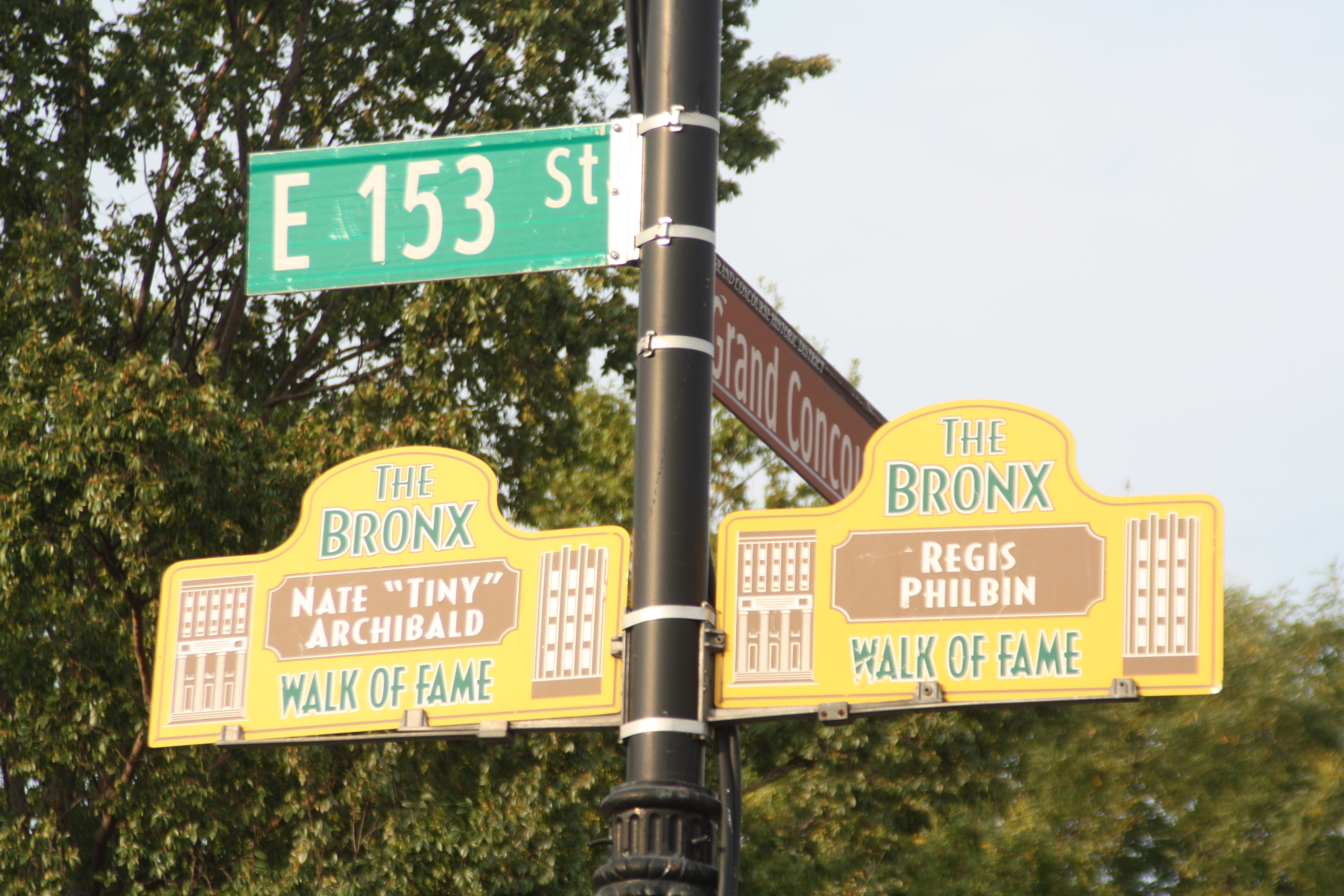
Bronx Walk of Fame signs for Nate Archibald and Regis Philbin at the corner of the Grand Concourse and East 153rd Street. They were two of the original five inductees.

The Bronx Walk of Fame is a 23-block corridor along the Grand Concourse, one of the main boulevards in the Bronx, the northernmost borough of New York City, with street signs honoring people who have lived in the borough and had worthy accomplishments. Individuals selected for honor frequently have been celebrities in artistic fields, but there also have been relative "unknowns" who have quietly made their mark on society, and several groups have also been honored. Elections to the Bronx Walk of Fame are held annually.

== History ==
Fernando Ferrer, borough president of the Bronx from 1987 to 2001, conceived the idea for the Bronx Walk of Fame in 1997 to honor people who had ties to The Bronx and made significant contributions to society.

The initial induction ceremony, on June 1, 1997, coincided with the conclusion of the 25th Bronx Week, an annual spring celebration of street festivals and concerts throughout the Bronx, a parade, and the Bronx Ball, a black-tie gala that includes a ceremony for the inductees. The inductees' names were inscribed on street signs mounted on lampposts on the Grand Concourse from East 161st Street to East 158th Street, in front of the Bronx County Courthouse, each bearing the name of an honoree. The original design included the honoree's name in the center of the sign, the words "The Bronx" above and "Walk of Fame" below, and stylized images of the Bronx County Courthouse on the left and a pizza shop on the right.

In 2007, the signs were replaced with a new design featuring a different typeface, a redrawn courthouse, and the pizza shop replaced by an Art Deco building meant to evoke the architectural style of many of the apartment buildings on the Grand Concourse. As more honorees have been added over the years, the signs have been placed further southward, extending past East 149th Street, beyond which there are much fewer pedestrians, and reaching the southern end of the Grand Concourse at East 138th Street.

In 2019, a five-year project was announced to reconstitute the walk along the Grand Concourse starting at East 149th Street near Hostos Community College and the Bronx General Post Office, extending to 167th Street near the Bronx Museum of the Arts. The new alignment would give an opportunity to group inductees by similar accomplishments, install new plaques, allow more pedestrians to have a better opportunity to see the plaques, and create a digital map.

== Election process ==
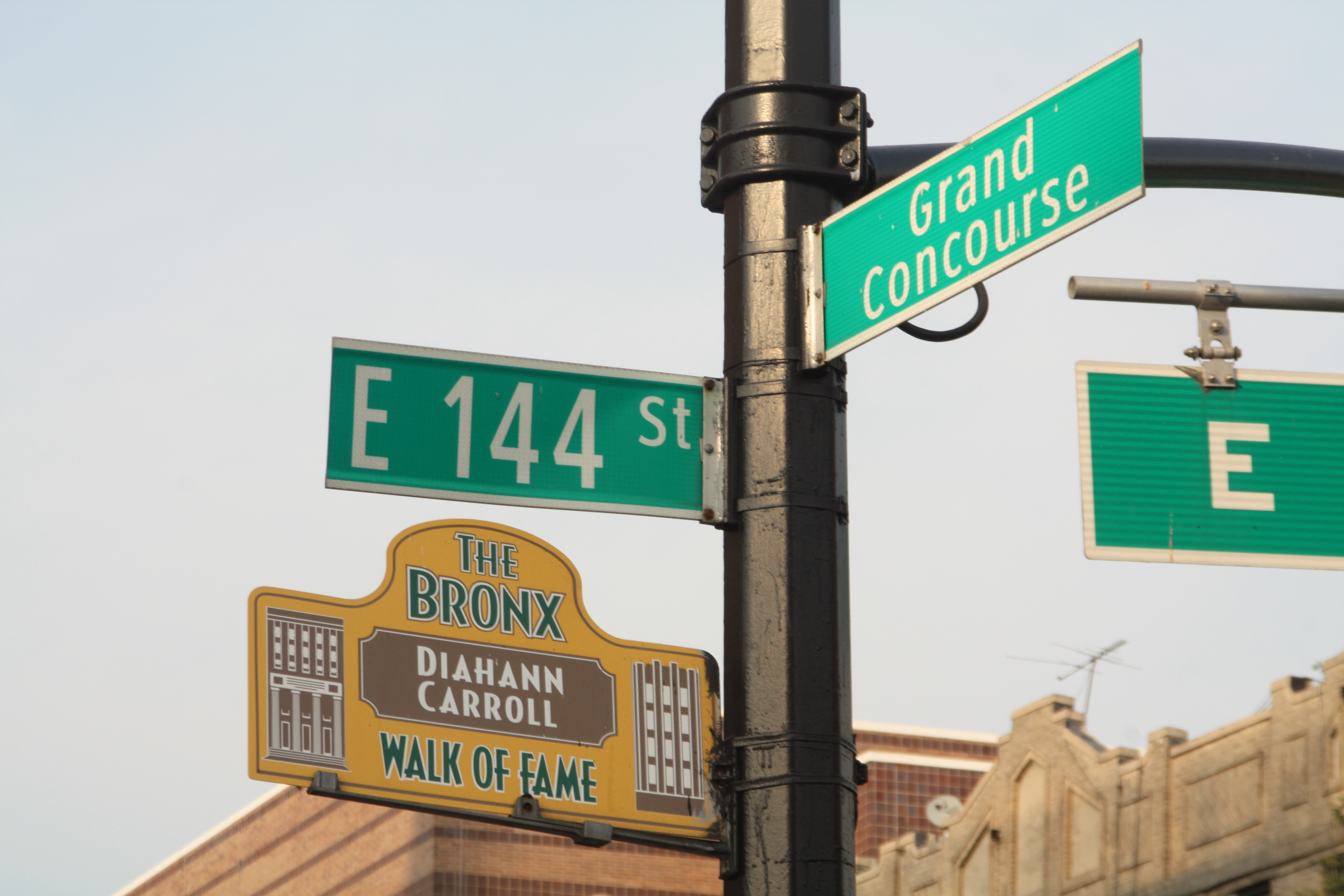
Bronx Walk of Fame sign for Diahann Carroll at the corner of the Grand Concourse and East 144th Street.

Nominations can be made by anybody in the community, and selections are determined by a committee consisting of the Bronx borough president, The Bronx Tourism Council, and The Bronx Overall Economic Development Corporation. Inductees' names are announced prior to Bronx Week. Their names are inscribed on oversized street signs that are unveiled in front of the Bronx County Courthouse located on the Grand Concourse between East 158th and 161st Streets, where they remain on lampposts for one year before being transferred to different locations along the Grand Concourse to make room for the next group of honorees.

The Bronx Walk of Fame is maintained by the Bronx Tourism Council. Since 2012, the number of inductees has been limited to five per year. In 2020, Bronx Week celebrations and the Walk of Fame selections were cancelled because of the COVID-19 epidemic, which hit New York City particularly hard that spring.

== List of honorees ==
The following people have been honored with election.

Year	Name	Field or Talent
1997	John Benitez (born 1957)	drummer, guitarist, songwriter, and music producer
1997	Nate Archibald (born 1948)	professional basketball player; six-time NBA All Star
1997	Regis Philbin (1931–2020)	television host, actor, singer, and producer
1997	Renée Taylor (born 1933)	actress, screenwriter, playwright, and director
1997	Robert Klein (born 1942)	comedian and actor
1998	Angela Bofill (born 1954)	singer and songwriter
1998	Garry Marshall (1934–2016)	film producer, director, screenwriter, actor, and comedian
1998	Red Buttons (1918–2006)	comedian and actor
1998	Rita Moreno (born 1931)	actress, dancer, and singer
1999	Esai Morales (born 1962)	actor
1999	Felipe López (born 1974)	professional basketball player
1999	Hal Linden (born 1931)	actor
1999	Joe Franklin (1926–2015)	radio and television host
2000	Dave Valentin (1952–2017)	musician
2000	Dolores Hope (1909–2011)	singer
2000	*Guy Williams (1924–1989)	actor and model
2000	Marvin Scott (born 1938)	newscaster and anchorman
2000	Neil deGrasse Tyson (born 1958)	astronomer
2000	Sam Garnes (born 1974)	professional football player
2000	Yomo Toro (1933–2012)	musician
2001	Burt Young (1940-2023)	actor
2001	Colin Powell (1937-2021)	United States Army general, secretary of state, and diplomat
2001	Diahann Carroll (1935–2019)	actress, singer, model
2001	E.L. Doctorow (1931–2015)	author
2001	Ed Kranepool (1944-2024)	major league baseball player
2001	Jim Ryan (born 1939)	news reporter and anchorman
2001	Johnny Pacheco (1935-2021)	musician, arranger, composer, music producer, and bandleader
2001	KRS-One (born 1965)	rapper
2001	Lyn Brown	newscaster
2001	Ace Frehley (1951-2025)	musician and songwriter
2001	*Stanley Kubrick (1928–1999)	film director, producer, and screenwriter
2002	Cathy Moriarty-Gentile (born 1960)	actress and singer
2002	Danny Aiello (1933–2019)	actor
2002	Gabe Pressman (1924–2017)	television journalist
2002	*Rosetta LeNoire (1911–2002)	actress, producer, and casting agent
2002	Ray Barretto (1928–2006)	musician and bandleader
2002	The Chantels	pop music group whose original members were Arlene Smith, Sonia Goring Wilson, Renée Minus White, Jackie Landry Jackson, and Lois Harris
2003	Daniel Libeskind (born 1946)	architect
2003	Kool DJ Red Alert (born 1956)	disc jockey
2003	Jake LaMotta (1922–2017)	professional boxer; world middleweight champion
2003	Jimmy Sabater (1936–2012)	musician
2003	Joey Kramer (born 1950)	musician; drummer for Aerosmith
2003	Liz Torres (born 1947)	actress, singer, and comedienne
2003	Michael Kay (born 1961)	sportscaster
2003	Valerie Simpson (born 1946)	singer, songwriter, and music producer
2004	*Bobby Darin (1936–1973)	singer, songwriter, and actor
2004	Grandmaster Flash and the Furious Five	hip hop group
2004	John Patrick Shanley (born 1950)	screenwriter, director, and playwright
2004	Shelley Morrison (1936–2019)	actress
2004	Sonia Manzano (born 1950)	actress, screenwriter, author, singer, and songwriter
2004	Willie Colón (1950-2026)	musician
2005	Army Archerd (1922–2019)	newspaper columnist
2005	*Charlie Palmieri (1927–1988)	musician and bandleader
2005	Daniel Schorr (1916–2010)	journalist
2005	Dominic Chianese (born 1931)	actor, singer, and musician
2005	Ed Pinckney (born 1963)	professional basketball player
2005	Eddie Palmieri (1936–2025)	musician and bandleader
2005	Joseíto Mateo (1920–2018)	musician, songwriter, and singer
2005	Kurtis Blow (born 1959)	rapper
2005	The Chiffons	pop music group whose members were Judy Craig, Patricia Bennett, Barbara Lee, and Sylvia Peterson
2006	Art Donovan (1924–2013)	professional football player
2006	Bobby Sanabria (born 1957)	musician
2006	La India (born 1969)	singer and songwriter
2006	Manny Azenberg (born 1934)	theatre producer
2006	Mary Higgins Clark (1927–2020)	author
2006	Tony Guida (born 1941)	newscaster and anchorman
2006	Afrika Bambaataa (1957-2026)	rapper
2007	Aventura	singing group whose members are Romeo Santos, Henry Santos, Lenny Santos, and Max Santos
2007	Budd Friedman (born 1932)	founder of the Improv comedy clubs
2007	Dion DiMucci (born 1939)	singer and songwriter
2007	Doris Roberts (1925–2016)	actress
2007	*Luther Vandross (1951–2005)	singer, songwriter, and record producer
2008	Adam Rodriguez (born 1975)	actor
2008	Ruth Westheimer (1928-2024)	born Karola Siegel, known as "Dr. Ruth", German-American sex therapist, talk show host, author, professor, Holocaust survivor, and former Haganah sniper.
2008	Grandmaster Caz (born 1960)	rapper and disc jockey
2008	Larry Chance and the Earls	singing group
2008	Rock Steady Crew	break dancers
2009	Charles Fox (born 1940)	composer
2009	Grand Wizzard Theodore (born 1963)	disc jockey
2009	Judy Reyes (born 1967)	actress
2009	Melissa Manchester (born 1951)	singer, songwriter, and actress
2009	Tony Orlando (born 1941)	singer, songwriter, and music producer
2010	Ed Lewis (born 1940)	founder of Essence magazine
2010	Herman Badillo (1928–2014)	United States congressman, Bronx borough president
2010	Jerry Vale (1930–2014)	singer
2010	Joanie Madden & Cherish the Ladies	music group
2011	Charles Latibeaudiere	television producer
2011	Chazz Palminteri (born 1952)	actor
2011	Irene Cara (1959–2022)	singer, songwriter, and actress
2011	Joy Bryant (born 1974)	actress
2012	Fat Joe (born 1970)	rapper
2012	Sol Negrin (1929–2017)	cinematographer
2012	Tyson Beckford (born 1970)	model, actor
2012	Valerie Capers (born 1935)	musician and composer
2013	Ellen Barkin (born 1954)	actress
2013	Miguel Angel Amadeo (born 1934)	musician and composer
2013	Robert Abrams (born 1938)	New York State attorney general, Bronx borough president
2014	David Zayas (born 1962)	actor
2014	Priscilla Lopez (born 1948)	actress and dancer
2014	Rachel Ticotin (born 1958)	actress
2014	Willie Colon (born 1983)	professional football player
2014	Swizz Beatz (born 1978)	rapper and record producer
2015	*Alfredo Thiebaud (1940–2014)	local businessman
2015	Dolph Schayes (1928–2015)	professional basketball player, 12-time National Basketball Association All-Star
2015	Malik Yoba (born 1967)	actor
2015	Stacey Dash (born 1966 or 1967)	actress
2016	Arlene Alda (born 1933)	musician, author, and photographer
2016	Eduardo Vilaro (born 1964)	dancer and choreographer
2016	Peter Sohn (born 1997)	animator, director, and voice actor
2016	Vincent Pastore (born 1946)	actor
2017	Manny Villafaña (born 1940)	medical device inventor
2017	Funkmaster Flex (born 1968)	disc jockey, rapper, record producer, actor, and radio host
2017	Prince Royce (born 1989)	singer and songwriter
2017	Selenis Leyva (born 1972)	actress
2018	Tarana Burke (born 1973)	activist who started the Me Too movement
2018	Slick Rick (born 1965)	rapper and record producer
2018	Maggie Siff (born 1974)	actress
2019	Regina Spektor (born 1980)	singer, songwriter, and pianist
2019	Iran Barkley (born 1960)	professional boxer
2019	Carolyn Porco (born 1953)	astronomer
2020	no inductees, elections cancelled because of the COVID-19 epidemic	
2021	Kid Capri (born 1967)	disc jockey, writer, producer, actor
2021	Sal Abbatiello (born 1952)	music business executive
2021	Joe Conzo Jr.	photographer
2022	Eif Rivera	artist, illustrator, television director
2022	Luis Antonio Ramos (born 1973)	actor
2022	Remy Ma (born 1980)	rapper
2023	Sunny Hostin (born 1968)	lawyer, journalist, and television host
2023	Juliet Papa	radio journalist
2023	God-Is Rivera	technology executive
2023	SWV	R&B vocal trio whose members are Cheryl (Coko) Gamble, Tamara (Taj) Johnson, and Leanne (Lelee) Lyons.
2024	Andrea Navedo (born 1969)	actress
2024	Antwan "Amadeus" Thompson	music producer
2024	Ozzie Virgil, Sr. (1932-2024)	major league baseball player
2024	Paloma Izquierdo-Hernandez	health care executive
2025	Devon Rodriguez (born 1996)	artist, painter
2025	Damian Priest (born 1982)	professional wrestler
2025	Kemba Walker (born 1990)	National Basketball Association basketball player
2025	Judy Torres (born 1968)	singer, musician
2025	Gary Axelbank (born about 1960)	journalist, TV personality, disc jockey
2026	Lenny Santiago	music industry executive
2026	Darlene Rodriguez (born 1970)	journalist
2026	Darrin Henson (born 1972)	choreographer, dancer, actor
2026	Roberto Escanio "Fanum" (born 1997)	streamer, influencer

* Posthumous honoree
