= Since I Fell for You =

Jazz and pop standard

Single by Lenny Welch

from the album Since I Fell for You
- B-side: "Are You Sincere"
- Released: October 1963
- Genre: Pop
- Length: 2:53
- Label: Cadence
- Songwriter: Buddy Johnson

Lenny Welch singles chronology
"A Taste of Honey" (1962)	"Since I Fell for You" (1963)	"Ebb Tide" (1964)

"Since I Fell for You" is a blues ballad composed by Buddy Johnson in 1945 that was first popularized by his sister, Ella Johnson, with Buddy Johnson and His Orchestra.

A version by Annie Laurie with Paul Gayten and His Trio in 1947 led to its eventual establishment as a jazz and pop standard. The song peaked at number three on the Billboard Race Records chart and number twenty on the pop chart.

== Lenny Welch recording ==
"Since I Fell for You" achieved its highest profile via a 1963 recording by Lenny Welch. While a student at Asbury Park High School in New Jersey, Welch had served as vocalist with a doo-wop group who performed locally, their gigs including "Since I Fell for You", which Welch knew from its 1954 recording by the Harptones.

In 1960, Welch had scored a strong regional hit with his Cadence Records label debut: "You Don't Know Me": although six follow-up single releases failed to garner significant attention, Cadence president Archie Bleyer retained faith in Welch, who would recall Bleyer saying: "If you ever think of a song you've sung, even with the [doo-wop] group back in New Jersey, tell me about it." After Welch mentioned "Since I Fell for You", Bleyer purchased the sheet music for the song: hearing Bleyer play the song from the sheet music Welch was at first surprised to hear the intro preceding the first verse, which had been omitted in the version by the Harptones or any other act Welch had heard sing the song: the intro would be a highlight of Welch's eventually recorded version.

After an unsatisfactory rehearsal phase it appeared that the idea of Welch remaking "Since I Fell for You" would be abandoned: however within a few weeks Welch suggested taking another shot at the song (Lenny Welch quote:) "Archie said: 'Come on, let's try it again'. We went back to the piano and suddenly it just seemed to work. Archie said: 'We're going to record it'."

Recorded in an August 13, 1963, session at Bell Sound Studios, Welch's "Since I Fell for You" had, within eight weeks of its recording, reached prosperity by means of the hit parades of several California markets, already being Top Ten in San Francisco at the time of its debut - at number 99 - on the Billboard Hot 100 dated October 26, 1963. Welch would recall that his single "breaking out" first in California, then across the U.S., only charting in his hometown of New York City after reaching the Top Ten of the Billboard Hot 100 dated December 14, 1963.

On the Hot 100 dated December 28, 1963, "Since I Fell for You" reached its chart peak of number 4, where it remained for two weeks. It also reached number three on the Easy Listening chart. "Since I Fell for You" would serve as the title cut for Welch's January 1964 debut album release, which also included his previous hit "You Don't Know Me", plus nine other tracks recorded for Cadence prior to 1963. In Canada it reached number 19.

Welch's "Since I Fell for You" had an unsuccessful January 23, 1967, re-release on Columbia Records, with Welch's 1962 recording of "A Taste of Honey" serving as B-side.

== Charting recordings ==
"Since I Fell for You" has been charted by many artists, including:

- Laura Lee (US no. 76, 1972)
- Charlie Rich (US No. 71; AC No. 11; Country No. 10, 1976)
- Hodges, James & Smith (US No. 15 dance chart, 1977)
- Con Hunley (US Country No. 20, 1979)
- Al Jarreau (US AC No. 10; Canada AC No. 3, 1987)
- Ruth Brown (SK-13 US 1969)
