= Time Will Tell =

Time Will Tell may refer to:

- Time Will Tell (Fifth Angel album), 1989
- Time Will Tell (game show), an American game show which aired on the DuMont Television Network in 1954
- Time Will Tell (Hebe Tien album), 2020
- "Time Will Tell" (Hikaru Utada song), a 1998 song by Hikaru Utada
- Time Will Tell (Millie album), 1970
- Time Will Tell (Paul Bley album), 1994
- Time Will Tell (Robert Cray album), 2003
- Time Will Tell (The Browning EP), 2011
- Time Will Tell (talk show), a Russian talk show that premiered in 2014
- "Time Will Tell", a 2001 episode of the television series Alias
- "Time Will Tell", a song by The Good Listeners, featured in the 2006 film The Devil Wears Prada
- "Time Will Tell", a 2011 song by Dave Hause from the album Resolutions
- "Time Will Tell", a 2013 song by Gregory Alan Isakov from the album The Weatherman
- "Time Will Tell", a 1978 song by Bob Marley and the Wailers, from the album Kaya
- "Time Will Tell", a 1992 song by the Black Crowes from The Southern Harmony and Musical Companion, cover of the Bob Marley song

== See also ==
- Only Time Will Tell (disambiguation)
