= My Boy Lollipop (album) =

Studio album by Millie Small
- Released: July 1964 (North America)
- Genres: Pop, Ska
- Label: Smash (North America)
- Producer: Chris Blackwell

Millie Small chronology
My Boy Lollipop (1964)	Time Will Tell (1970)

Singles from My Boy Lollipop
- 1. "My Boy Lollipop" Released: April 7, 1964; 2. "Sweet William" Released: July 11, 1964; 3. "Don't You Know" Released: November 23, 1964

My Boy Lollipop was the first album for Jamaican singer Millie Small and her only album for Smash Records. The title track has been credited by NME with sparking the popularity of reggae and ska, as well as opening doors for other genres of Jamaican music on the global stage.

The album peaked at No. 132 on the Billboard 200 on Aug. 29, 1964. The album spawned two hits on the Billboard Hot 100 that same year: "My Boy Lollipop," peaked at No. 2 on the on July 4th, and “Sweet William” peaked at No. 40 on Sept. 5th. The single "Don't You Know" did not chart.

== Cover art ==
On the front and back of the album, Millie is called "the Blue Beat Girl". Ernest Ranglin is credited for the accompaniment and direction.

The back of the album cover contains an essay about Millie that includes information about her early life in Jamaica. It claims that a talent contest led to a recording career and hit singles in Jamaica, which led to her discovery by British record producer Chris Blackwell. According to the essay, Blackwell then brought her to London to promote her talent and a new type of Jamaican music called "Ska." The essay also mistakenly says that she was born on October 8, 1948; she was actually born on October 6, 1947. The essay's conclusion tells of the success of her 1964 hit "My Boy Lollipop" in the US and how it made her one of the most sought-after performers by producers of television and stage, and adds that Millie had also finished a movie role.

== Track listing ==
Side 1
No.	Title	Writer(s)	Length
1.	"My Boy Lollipop"	Johnny Roberts, Robert Spencer	2:01
2.	"Oh, Henry"	Millie Small, Johnny Edwards	1:55
3.	"Sugar Dandy"	Derrick Harriott	2:00
4.	"Since You've Been Gone"	Neil Sedaka, Howard Greenfield	2:30
5.	"He's Mine"	Zola Taylor	2:00
6.	"What Am I Living For"	Fred Jay, Art Harris	2:45

Side 2
No.	Title	Writer(s)	Length
1.	"Sweet William"	Buddy Kaye, Philip Springer	1:45
2.	"Bluey Louey"	Mike Bradley	1:50
3.	"Don't You Know"	Millie Small, Tony Thomas	1:52
4.	"Tom Hark"		1:40
5.	"Until You're Mine"	Harry Robinson	2:15
6.	"I'm in Love Again"	Fats Domino	1:55

== Charts ==
Album - Billboard (United States)

Year	Chart	Position
1964	Billboard Top LPs	132

Singles - Billboard (United States)

Year	Single	Chart	Position
1964	"My Boy Lollipop"	The Billboard Hot 100	2
1964	"My Boy Lollipop"	UK Singles Chart	2
1964	"Sweet William"	The Billboard Hot 100	40
1964	"Sweet William"	UK Singles Chart	30
