= Time Will Tell (Millie album) =

Time Will Tell is a 1970 album by Jamaican singer Millie (best known as the singer of the 1964 hit “My Boy Lollipop”), reissued in 2004 on CD by Trojan Records with additional tracks.

Most of the original tracks are love songs, but the album also includes a cover version of Nick Drake's "Mayfair." Among the extra tracks are 1962-1963 ska duets with Roy Panton, duets with Jackie Edwards and solo tracks from the mid-1960s which have been described as being in more of a R&B style, and ska tracks from the later 1960s. The production was by Eddie Wolfram with the backing band of Symarip. Robert Kirby was credited for the instrumental arrangements.

== Track listing ==
1. "Melting Pot"
2. "My Love And I"
3. "Mayfair"
4. "Poor Little Willie"
5. "Give Me Tomorrow"
6. "White Boys"
7. "Enoch Power"
8. "Going To The Circus"
9. "Come And Hold Me Tight"
10. "Sunday Morning"
11. "I Couldn't Take My Love Away From You"
12. "No Good"
13. "Time Will Tell"
14. "We'll Meet" (*)
15. "You're The Only One" (*)
16. "Oh Merna" (*)
17. "Marie" (*)
18. "The Vow" (*)
19. "My Desire" (*)
20. "That's How Strong My Love Is" (*)
21. "My Street" (*)
22. "A Mixed Up, Fickle, Moody, Self-Centred, Spoiled Kind Of Boy" (*)
23. "Peaches And Cream" (*)
24. "Ooh Ooh" (*)
25. "You Better Forget" (*)
26. "Three Nights A Week" (*)
27. "I've Been Around" (*)
28. "Honey Hush" (*)

NB. (*) indicates the extra track(s) included on the album's re-issue.
