= Ronnie Bright =

- Born: Ronald David Bright; October 18, 1938; New York City, New York, U.S.
- Died: November 26, 2015 (aged 77)
- Genres: Doo-wop; R&B
- Occupation: Singer
- Years active: 1950s–2015
- Formerly of: The Cadillacs; The Coasters; The Valentines; The Deep River Boys

Ronald David Bright (October 18, 1938 – November 26, 2015) was an American R&B and doo-wop singer of the 1950s, 1960s and 1970s. He was born in New York City.

== Biography ==
Bright was the bass vocalist for doo-wop groups the Valentines, the Cadillacs, the Deep River Boys, and the Coasters. He did session work for artists such as Barry Mann, Jackie Wilson, Peter Gabriel, and Johnny Cymbal. His most recognizable vocals are from Johnny Cymbal's 1963 hit song "Mr. Bass Man." He sang with the Valentines (the group was previously called the Dreamers) from 1954 to 1957, briefly with the Cadillacs in 1960, and the Deep River Boys in the late 1960s. In 1965, Bright released a record for Coed Records as Ronnie and the Schoolmates. He joined the Coasters in April 1968, replacing Dub Jones, and left the group in 2009. He died on November 26, 2015, at the age of 77.

== Discography ==
=== Group singles and recordings ===
- "Summer Love"/"For You" (Bruce) (1954) (unreleased) (The Dreamers)
- "Tonight Kathleen"/"Summer Love" (Old Town #1009) (1954) (The Valentines)
- "Lily Maebelle"/"Falling for You" (Rama #171) (1955) (The Valentines)
- "I Love You Darling"/"Hand Me Down Love" (Rama #181) (1955) (The Valentines)
- "Christmas Prayer"/"Kiss Me" (Rama #186) (1955) (The Valentines)
- "Why"/"The Woo Woo Train" (Rama #196) (1956) (The Valentines)
- "Twenty Minutes Before the Hour"/"I'll Never Let You Go" (Rama #201) (1956) (The Valentines)
- "Nature's Creation"/"My Story of Love" (Rama #208) (1956) (The Valentines)
- "Don't Say Goodnight"/"I Cried Oh, Oh" (Rama #228) (1957) (The Valentines)
- "Tell Me Today"/"It's Love" (Josie #876) (1960) (Speedo & The Cadillacs)
- "Who Put the Bomp" (ABC Paramount #10237) (1961) (Barry Mann)
- "Baby Workout" (Brunswick #55239) (1963) (Jackie Wilson)
- "Mr. Bass Man" (Kapp #503) (1963) (Johnny Cymbal)
- "Just Born (To Be Your Baby)"/"Don't Don't Don't Dropout" (Coed #605) (1965) (Ronnie & The Schoolmates)
- "Act Right"/"The World Is Changing" (Turntable #504) (1969) (The Coasters)
- "Good Lovin'" (King) (1971) (unreleased) (The Coasters)
- "Cool Jerk" (King #6389) (1971) (The Coasters)
- "Mustang Sally" (King) (1971) (The Coasters)
- "The In Crowd" (King) (1971) (The Coasters)
- "On Broadway" (King) (1971) (The Coasters)
- "Hush Don't Talk About It"/"The World Keeps On Turning" (Wicked #8103) (1976) (Carl Gardner & The Coasters)
- "Check Mr. Popeye" (lead vocals for the Coasters on Southside Johnny's album This Time Is for Real on Epic #34668) (1977)
- "In Your Eyes" (backing vocals from Peter Gabriel's Geffen album So) (1986)
- "Just Born (To Be Your Baby)"/"Don't Don't Don't Dropout" (Collectables #1144) (reissue) (Ronnie & the Schoolmates)
