= Only Time Will Tell =

Only Time Will Tell may refer to:

- Only Time Will Tell (Sandeé album), 1991
- Only Time Will Tell (Ian Gomm and Jeb Loy Nichols album), 2010
- "Only Time Will Tell" (song), a 1982 song by Asia
- "Only Time Will Tell", a song by John Cale from Sabotage/Live
- "Only Time Will Tell", a song by Ill Bill from The Hour of Reprisal
- "Only Time Will Tell", a song by Jimmy Buffett from Banana Wind
- "Only Time Will Tell", a song by Mike Oldfield from The Songs of Distant Earth
- "Only Time Will Tell", a song by Nelson
- "Only Time Will Tell", a song by Saga from Wildest Dreams
- "Only Time Will Tell (novel), a 2011 novel by Jeffrey Archer

== See also ==
- Time Will Tell (disambiguation)
