= Crazy Elephant =

American pop band

- Origin: United States
- Genres: Bubblegum pop
- Years active: 1967–1970
- Label: Bell
- Past members: Robert Spencer; Kenny Cohen; Bob Avery; Larry Laufer; Hal King; Ronnie Bretone

Crazy Elephant was an American pop band noted for their 1969 hit single, "Gimme Gimme Good Lovin'".

== History ==
Crazy Elephant was a studio concoction, the Marzano-Calvert Studio Band, created by Jerry Kasenetz and Jeffry Katz of Super K Productions, promoted in Cash Box magazine as allegedly being a group of Welsh coal miners:

Kasenetz-Katz discovered their latest hitmaking group, the Crazy Elephant (whom they consider the ultimate in underground acts) in a Welsh coal mine. As everyone can plainly see by looking at the charts, they rose to overnight fame. 'We come up on the elevator,' said the group's lead singer. Nevile Crisken, London nightclub owner, read an article in The Mining News, the country's leading underground newspaper, about a group of miners who hadn't been in the sun in four years. Working in the lowermost depths of the mine, they spent their spare time playing in a rock and roll band. 'We had lots of rocks down there too,' grins the group's drummer. McSteve hopped the first train to Wales, located the mine and descended 18,372,065 feet beneath the surface of the earth and signed the group to a long-term management pact.

Former Cadillacs member Robert Spencer was widely utilized on lead vocals, though future 10cc member Kevin Godley took lead vocals on "There Ain't No Umbopo", recorded at Strawberry Studios in Stockport, England, and released on the Bell label in May 1970. A touring group was formed later for promotional purposes. The bassist on "Gimme Gimme Good Lovin'" was Norman Marzano, part of the Marzano-Calvert studio group. The song was covered by Detroit band Adrenalin featuring vocalist David Larson in 1979 and later by Helix.

Crazy Elephant's "Gimme Gimme Good Lovin'" (b/w "The Dark Part of My Mind") was a transatlantic one-hit wonder, making number 12 on both the U.S. Billboard Hot 100 chart and the UK Singles Chart. Several follow-up singles, including "Gimme Some More" (b/w "My Baby (Honey Pie)") and "Sunshine Red Wine" (b/w "Pam"), failed to chart.

== Members ==
- Robert Spencer (vocals)
- Kenny Cohen (flute, saxophone, vocals), who later performed with The Eagles, Santana, Rod Stewart and B. B. King
- Bob Avery (drums), who also played with The Music Explosion
- Larry Laufer (keyboards, vocals)
- Hal King (vocals)
- Ronnie Bretone (bass)

== Discography ==
=== Singles ===
Year	Title	Peak chart positions		Record Label	B-side	Album
Year	Title	US	UK	Record Label	B-side	Album
1967	"The Right Girl" (as The Livin' End)	—	—	Spontaneous	"Your Cheatin' Heart"	
1969	"Gimme Gimme Good Lovin'"	—	—	Bell	"Hips and Lips"	Crazy Elephant
1969	"Gimme Gimme Good Lovin'"	12	12	Bell	"Dark Part of My Mind"	Crazy Elephant
1969	"Sunshine, Red Wine"	104	—	Bell	"Pam"	Crazy Elephant
1969	"Gimme Some More"	116	—	Bell	"My Baby (Honey Pie)"	
1969	"There's a Better Day a Comin' (Na, Na, Na, Na)"	—	—	Bell	"Space Buggy"	
1970	"There Ain't No Umbopo"	—	—	Bell	"Landrover"	

=== Albums ===
Year	Album	Record label
1969	Crazy Elephant	Bell

== See also ==
- List of 1960s one-hit wonders in the United States
- Doctor Father
