= Jackie Landry Jackson =

American musician (1941–1997)

Jackie Landry Jackson

Jackie Landry Jackson (May 22, 1941 – December 23, 1997) was a member of the Chantels, the second nationally successful black female pop music group. She died of breast cancer in 1997.

Jacqulyn Jackson was born in the Bronx. She and Arlene Smith, Lois Harris, Sonia Goring, and Rene Minus, who had been friends since they were children, performed in the local church choir at the Saint Anthony Padua School, and eventually formed the Chantels, one of the earliest successful black girl groups.

After her initial singing career ended, she became a Court Reporter for Bronx Criminal Court. She rarely spoke about her experiences with the Chantels while employed in the court system. When oldies and rock and roll revivals came into vogue, she revisited her singing career.

Jackson was buried in Saint Raymond's Cemetery in the Bronx.
