= My True Story (song) =

Single by The Jive Five
- B-side: "When I Was Single"
- Released: 1961
- Genre: Doo-wop
- Length: 2:30
- Label: Beltone
- Songwriters: Eugene Pitt, Oscar Waltzer, Joe Rene
- Producer: Joe Rene

"My True Story" is a 1961 single recorded by The Jive Five and co-written by the group's lead singer Eugene Pitt, along with Oscar Waltzer and Joe Rene.

== Chart performance ==
The single was the biggest hit for the group on both the R&B and pop charts. "My True Story" made it to number three on the Billboard Hot 100 and was number one on the R&B Sides chart for three weeks.
