= The Doo Wop All Stars =

- Origin: United States
- Genres: Doo-wop, R&B
- Years active: 1992–present

The Doo Wop Royal All Stars was formed in 1992 as one of the first "supergroups" in to the doo wop music genre, combining members from other groups. "It's a show within a show," remarked longtime WCBS FM deejay Bobby Jay. The group remains active today, with various members and led by Daniel Loria, son of founding member Art Loria. It originally performed and recorded as "The Royal All Stars", and has also been known as "Golden Group Memories".

== Original lineup ==
The original lineup included:

- Artie Loria
- Vito Balsamo
- Randy Silverman
- Eugene Pitt
- Lenny Welch

== History ==
This original lineup recorded a live album "Live at the Taj – Royally Yours" while performing at a celebration for the chief running officer of the Trump Taj Mahal Hotel & Casino in Atlantic City, New Jersey. It was to be released from Dazzle Records sometime in late 2012–2013. in 1993, Lenny Welch left the group and headed for the West Coast to pursue his ambitions in the acting field and also reconcentrate on his solo efforts. He was replaced by BJ Jones, who was a member of such groups as The Dubs, The Drifters and The Five Satins. Taking over for Jones was Jimmy Merchant: an original member of Frankie Lymon & the Teenagers. Merchant, along with Pitt, Loria, Silverman, Balsamo and Daniel Loria spent the years 1992–1998 touring and performing all over the country in major markets, major venues and the cruise line circuits. They have several recordings still not released, but were expected in 2012–1013. As "The Royal All Stars", they were a regular in the then active Pittsburgh doo wop scene (performed at the famous "PORKSTOCK" at Three Rivers Stadium in honor of legendary jock Porky Chadwick). They also performed in Las Vegas, California, and Ohio many times. This lineup performed their last show in 1998 at Windows on the World atop the World Trade Towers.

1998 saw the group split into two factions, with Silverman and Balsamo going on as "Golden Group Memories", and Pitt along with the Lorias' continued as "The Doo Wop All Stars". The year 2000 saw a new lineup of "The Doo Wop All Stars" that included Artie Loria, Eugene Pitt, Harold Gill (from the Continentals / The Drifters), Maurice Unthank (from The Teenagers/ Jive Five). This incarnation of the group saw the next 7 years of active performances and recordings. In 2003 they recorded "It's Christmas" on It Doesn't Matter Music label. It was credited to "Pitt-Knick", a name play on Eugene Pitt and the groups long lasting relationship recording many of the famous "NIC NIC NIC " bumper commercials with the TV network Nickelodeon in the beginning stages of the new network. In 2001, they recorded "We Will Never Fall" as a tribute to the heroes and victims of 9/11.

In 2007, Pitt's health issues caused the group to cut down on their touring, and eventually Pitt was replaced by Freddie Scott. After Scott died after a brief illness, The Doo Wop All Stars continued on with Artie Loria, Danny Loria and Harold Gilly.

Art Loria was killed in a home accident on October 23, 2010. Gill is currently performing with The Continentals when not with "The Doo Wop All Stars". Lenny Welch continued to perform as a solo artist and occasionally acted in bit parts. Welch died on April 8, 2025. Danny Loria, now manages the name "Doo Wop All Stars" and is currently working on releasing years of shelved recordings. He and Gill also have plans to re-engage steady performing in 2012 with a list of engagements. Balsamo performs with various local cover bands. Sillverman has retired due to illness. The group's remaining original member Eugene Pitt died June 28, 2018, in Newberry, South Carolina.

== Sources ==
- Video quote from Bobby Jay on opening remarks on group's promotional video
- Porky Chadwick – station playlist 2002
- Vocal Group Hall of Fame; Sharon, Pa.; membership roster
- Doo Wop 50 liner notes
- Dave Raymer – doo wop historian – Notes on Doo Wop Groups and Biographies
- Billboard Archive – Musical Acts – song placements
- The Rolling Stone Book of "History of Rock and Roll"
- Interview with group Manager Daniel Loria – Alpine Entertainment 2012
- 9/11 Hero's Tribute Foundation
- WCBS FM 101.1 Radio (NY) Group Interview
