= Look in My Eyes =

Single by The Chantels

from the album On Tour
- B-side: "Glad to Be Back"
- Released: June 1961
- Recorded: 1961
- Genre: R&B
- Length: 2:23
- Label: Carlton
- Songwriter: Richard Barrett

The Chantels singles chronology
"How Could You Call It Off" (1960)	"Look in My Eyes" (1961)	"Well I Told You" (1961)

"Look in My Eyes" is a song written by Richie Barrett and performed by the American R&B female group The Chantels. It peaked at #14 on the Billboard Hot 100 and at #6 on the Hot R&B Sides in 1961.

== Weekly charts ==
Chart (1961)	Peak position
Canada (CHUM Chart)	15
US Billboard Hot 100	14
US Hot R&B Sides (Billboard)	6
