= Vito & the Salutations =

1960s doo-wop group

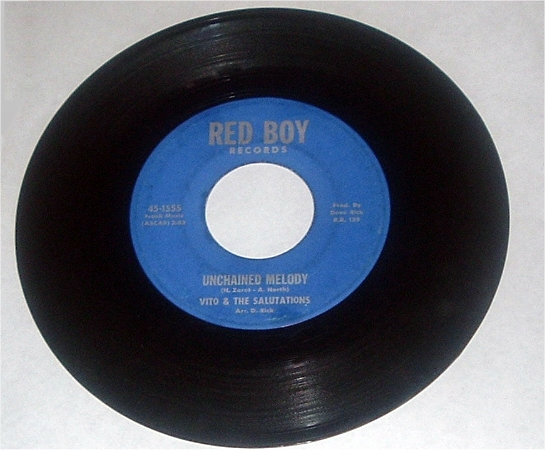
Unchained Melody on the Red Boy label (originally released on Herald)

Vito & the Salutations is an Italian/Irish/Jewish-American New York City doo-wop group from the 1960s. They began performing their four-part harmonies while still in high school, getting practice by singing in subways and at railroad stations. But they never expected anything to come of it, until one of the band members was introduced to someone at a local record company, and the band was asked to make some recordings. Their first popular record, "Gloria," was a regional hit. But Vito & the Salutations became best known for a surprise million-selling hit a year later, in the summer of 1963: they took "Unchained Melody," a 1955 hit ballad by Al Hibbler that they heard on the car radio, as they drove to perform at a concert, and transformed it into an up-tempo, doo-wop song. "Unchained Melody" reached number 66 on the Cash Box hit parade, and it made the top ten in many cities: for example, in New York City, the song reached #3 on top-40 powerhouse WABC. The record was originally released on Herald (H-583). The original group consisted of: Barry Solomon, Bob DiPaolo, Bobby Mitchel and Vito Balsamo (a friend of Bob DiPaolo's younger brother John.) That group broke up after their success with their song Gloria. Another group was formed by their manager Dave Rick. That second group consisted of: Frankie Fox (bass baritone), Sheldon Buchansky (second tenor), Raymond JP Russell (first tenor) and Vito Balsamo (lead, baritone, and falsetto). Balsamo came from an immigrant family: his parents were from Palermo, Italy and he grew up in Brooklyn, listening to opera. But he fell in love with rock and roll, much to the dismay of his parents. Vito joined a group and recorded his first song when he was only fifteen. The B side of "Unchained Melody" was "Hey, Hey, Baby," a tune composed by Murray Kanner, Frankie Fox and Dave Rick. Vito & the Salutations also performed their version of "Unchained Melody" on American Bandstand.

The group existed from 1961–1967, with a reunion concert performed at Hunter College in 1971, only Frankie and Sheldon Buchansky were the original members of this group in this performance. Featured lead singer was Vito Balsamo, who also performed with the DelVons and The Kelloggs. In the early 1990s, Balsamo participated in a doo-wop nostalgia tour, performing as Vito Balsamo and the Cavaliers: this band included some former members of J. Frank Wilson and the Cavaliers (whose big hit was "Last Kiss" in 1964). From (1990-1991)-(1996-1999) Balsamo recorded and toured continuously with The Doo Wop All Stars whose members included Eugene Pitt (Jive Five), Artie Loria (Belmonts/Earls), Randy Silver (Impalas) and Lenny Welch. Vito still performs on occasional nostalgia tours, such as in The Golden Group Memories, which was seen on PBS in 1999 and 2000. Other lead singers were bass baritone Frankie Fox and falsettos Ray Russell and Randy Siver, who joined the group after Ray Russell moved on to become a producer, writer and director with James Duffy of Britton records; later, Frank Hidalgo and Eddie Parducci shared the lead with Vito in the group or on leave from the group. Over the years there have been many substitutes and replacements: Jack Mercury, Alan Messinger, Madie Seigal, Vinny Cognato, Johnny Monforte and Randy Silverman along with Frank and Vito recorded a single in 1967, "Bring Back Yesterday" b/w "I Want You to Be My Baby", on Boom Records. In the early '70s Sheldon Buchansky returned to form a new Salutations with Vito Eddie Parducci, Jimmy Spinelli, Frankie Graziano and others. Meanwhile, Vito Balsamo lost the right to use the name "Vito & the Salutations" in a court case in 1984, as a new band that included several former members took over the name. By 1986, after several appeals, Vito began using "Vito Balsamo and his Group," when he performed. And sometimes, when he toured, he was listed in newspapers as or "Vito Balsamo, formerly of the Salutations."

The group's unique version of "Unchained Melody" has been included in several movies, most notably the 1990 film Goodfellas. It also can be heard in the Sci-Fi Dine-In restaurant at Disney's Hollywood Studios at Walt Disney World.
