= Arlene Smith =

Arlene Smith (October 5, 1941 – July 29, 2026) was an American singer and songwriter who was the lead vocalist of the doo-wop girl group the Chantels.

== Early life and education ==
Smith was born on October 5, 1941, in the Bronx, New York City, to Ray and Iola Smith. She attended St. Anthony of Padua School in the Bronx, where she sang in the school choir with her future bandmates. After leaving the Chantels, Smith studied music theory and composition for a period at the Juilliard School. She later earned a master's degree in education, following her period of study at Juilliard.

== Career ==
In the early 1950s, Smith formed a vocal group with fellow choir members Sonia Goring, Lois Harris, Renée Minus and Jackie Landry. The group took the name the Chantels from St. Frances de Chantal, a nearby Catholic school. In 1957, Richard Barrett of the Valentines introduced the group to George Goldner, who released its records on his End Records label.

Smith wrote the group's first single, "He's Gone", which was released in August 1957 and reached number 71 on the Billboard pop chart. The Chantels recorded "Maybe" in a Manhattan church basement in October 1957, with Smith singing the lead vocal. End Records released "Maybe" in December 1957, and the single reached number 15 on the Billboard pop chart and number 2 on the R&B chart. "Maybe" became the Chantels' biggest hit, and the single sold more than one million copies.

Smith's name was initially left off the songwriting credit for "Maybe", which listed Barrett and Goldner as its writers. In 1958, the Chantels had further chart singles with "Every Night (I Pray)" and "I Love You So". The Chantels' first album, We Are the Chantels, was released on the End Records label in 1958. Smith left the Chantels in 1959 to pursue a solo career, and the remaining members continued to perform without her.

In 1961, Smith released the solo single "Love, Love, Love", which was produced by Phil Spector and did not chart. Smith later taught music to elementary school students in the Bronx, including at P.S. 157 in Morrisania, until her retirement. From the early 1970s until 2012, Smith toured with a new lineup of the Chantels. During the 1990s, Smith also appeared with the original members of the Chantels in a series of reunion performances.

Smith died of a heart attack at a hospital in the Bronx on July 29, 2026, at the age of 84.

== Awards and honors ==
In 2002, Smith and the other members of the Chantels were inducted into the Vocal Group Hall of Fame. Rolling Stone magazine ranked "Maybe" at number 199 on its list of the 500 Greatest Songs of All Time. In April 2019, a section of Prospect Avenue in Morrisania was co-named in honor of the Chantels, with Smith among the group members recognized.
