= Deep River Boys =

American gospel music group

The Deep River Boys
- Origin: Hampton, Virginia, United States
- Genres: Gospel
- Past members: Harry Douglass; Vernon Gardner; George Lawson; Jimmy Lundy; Edward Ware; Cameron Williams; Rhett Butler; Ray Durant; Carter Wilson; Charlie Ford; Ronnie Bright; Eddie Whaley Jr. Albert Benjamin Bishop

The Deep River Boys were an American gospel music group active from the mid-1930s and into the 1980s. The group performed spirituals, gospel, and R&B.

== Members ==
The original group consisted of Harry Douglass (baritone), Vernon Gardner (first tenor), George Lawson (second tenor) and Edward Ware (bass). George Lawson was replaced by Willie James (Jimmy) Lundy in 1950, who became first tenor, with Vernon Gardner switching to second tenor. Other personnel changes took place during the group's long history, although Douglass remained as a constant throughout.

== Musical career ==
The group began at Hampton Institute, now known as Hampton University in Hampton, Virginia. Initial success came about through their winning a talent competition on the radio which, in turn, led to further radio and stage appearances. During World War II, they toured extensively for the USO entertaining US troops abroad. In 1952, their song "Recess in Heaven" became their first hit. They also toured with Bill "Bojangles" Robinson.

In 1950, they left for Canada where they had a long engagement in Montreal. Upon return, they appeared on TV on The Ed Sullivan Show and The Milton Berle Show. They then left for another long engagement in Philadelphia. Early that year, they recorded "Solid as a Rock" with the Count Basie Orchestra. In July, they also recorded a version of "Tuxedo Junction" with Erskine Hawkins, the composer of the tune. Then, they left for England where they embarked upon a 10-week engagement at the London Palladium. Whilst there they received a citation naming them as the "Most popular entertainers of American troops in England".

Despite their success in England and in Canada, their records were not selling well in the US, so they left their former record company, RCA, and signed for a smaller company, Beacon Records. However, even with the promotional efforts of Joe Davis, the owner of Beacon, their record sales were still disappointing, so they re-signed with RCA; despite this in 1954, they were back with Beacon. They also performed with Count Basie, Fats Waller, Charlie Christian and Thelma Carpenter. In December 1956, they had a hit on the UK Singles Chart with "That's Right", which reached number 29.

In Europe, they were especially popular in countries such as Sweden and Norway from the 1950s and upwards, appearing on numerous TV shows, even releasing several hit singles performing songs in Swedish and Norwegian. In the winter of 1956, they were photographed by The Newcastle Journal with Rev. Eric L. Robinson, then minister of Central Methodist Church, Newcastle-on-Tyne, England. They returned to the northeast at least once more, in October 1958, and participated in a special noon-time church service, introducing Northumbrians to American gospel music. As late as the 1970s, they recorded a Norwegian-language version of the Norwegian hit song "Ratiti". The group continued to tour into the early 1980s.

The last surviving early member of the group, Jimmy Lundy, lived in Portsmouth, Virginia and died in October 2007, in Maryview Hospital in Portsmouth, Virginia.

Ronnie Bright was the bass of the Deep River Boys from 1964 until 1968. After leaving the group, he joined the Coasters. He died in 2015.

Eddie Whaley Jr. (the son of Eddie Whaley of the comedy duo Scott and Whaley), the last surviving member of the Deep River Boys, was tenor from 1969 until 1971. He was born in Brighton, England, had a role as a child in the film Black Narcissus, and now lives in Florida.

== Awards and honors ==
In 2019, their 1941 single "They Look Like Men of War" was selected by the Library of Congress for preservation in the National Recording Registry for being "culturally, historically, or aesthetically significant".
