= My Boy Lollipop =

1956 song performed by Barbie Gaye

"My Boy Lollypop"

Single by Barbie Gaye
- B-side: "Say You Understand"
- Released: 1956
- Venue: New York City, U.S.
- Genre: Rhythm and blues, novelty
- Length: 2:18
- Label: Darl
- Songwriters: Robert Spencer, Barbie Gaye (Co-credited to Johnny Roberts)
- Producer: Leroy Kirkland

Barbie Gaye singles chronology
| "My Boy Lollypop" (1956) | "Rock and Roll Baby" (1957) |

"My Boy Lollipop" (originally "My Girl Lollypop") is a song written in the mid-1950s by Robert Spencer of the doo-wop group the Cadillacs, and usually credited to Spencer, Morris Levy, and Johnny Roberts. It was first recorded in 1956 by American singer Barbie Gaye under the title "My Boy Lollypop". A later version recorded by Jamaican singer Millie Small in 1964, with very similar rhythm, became an international hit that time and is one of the first songs to introduce ska music.

== Barbie Gaye original version ==
The original song "My Girl Lollypop" was written by Robert Spencer of the doo-wop group the Cadillacs. Notorious record company executive Morris Levy agreed to purchase the song from Spencer. Although not involved in writing the song, Levy and alleged gangster Johnny Roberts listed themselves as the song's authors. In an effort to avoid sharing any royalties with Spencer, Levy removed Spencer's name from the original writing credits. Levy even claimed that Robert Spencer was his pseudonym.

The song caught the attention of one of Levy's partners, the later convicted mobster and music mogul Gaetano Vastola, aka "Corky". Vastola had recently discovered 14-year-old singer Barbie Gaye (born Barbara Gaffney) after hearing her sing on a street corner in Coney Island, Brooklyn. Vastola was so impressed that he immediately took her to meet New York radio DJ Alan Freed. Gaye sang a few songs for them and Freed was equally impressed. Vastola became Gaye's manager and within days, he acquired the sheet music and lyrics for "My Girl Lollypop" from Levy. He gave them to Gaye, with no specific instructions except to change the gender of the song's subject and be ready to perform it by the following week. Gaye changed the song's title to "My Boy Lollypop" and rewrote the song accordingly. She added non-lyrical utterances such as "whoa" and "uh oh", chose the notes for the lyrics, shortened and lengthened notes, decided which lyrics to repeat ("I love ya, I love ya, I love ya so") and added the word "dandy" to describe the subject.

When it came time to record, Gaye cut school and took the subway to a recording studio in Midtown Manhattan. Gaye met the three members of the session band, guitarist Leroy Kirkland, saxophonist Al Sears and drummer Panama Francis. The band leader, Kirkland, asked Gaye to sing the song for them. After listening to her, they improvised music to match her vocals. They decided to record the song in a relatively new style of R&B called shuffle. The four musicians, including the white teenage girl, went into the studio and recorded the song in one take. Barbie Gaye was paid $200 for her writing contributions to "My Boy Lollypop" and her studio recording.

Barbie Gaye's recording was released as a single by Darl Records in late 1956. It was heavily played by Alan Freed, and listener requests made the song No. 25 on Freed's Top 25 on WINS, New York in November 1956. The record sold in sufficient quantities locally to gain her a place in Freed's annual Christmas show at the New York Paramount in December 1956, when she opened for Little Richard. The following year, Gaye toured with Richard and Fats Domino. The singer and songwriter Ellie Greenwich, then a teenager living on Long Island, was so taken by the record that she named herself Ellie Gaye when she embarked on her recording career. Gaye's recording of "My Boy Lollypop" was popular in New York City, and a few other Northeastern cities. In the late 1950s, Chris Blackwell, founder of Island Records, sold copies of the song to the Jamaican Sound Systems, where it became a popular song among sound system patrons, despite the fact that its singer was not of African descent. Her manager, Gaetano Vastola, routinely counterfeited his artists' music to keep all the profits, so the record's sales are difficult to determine.

== Millie Small version ==
"My Boy Lollipop"

Single by Millie Small

from the album My Boy Lollipop
- B-side: "Something's Gotta Be Done"
- Released: February or March 1964 (UK)
- Genre: Ska
- Length: 2:01
- Label: Fontana, Island, Smash
- Songwriters: Robert Spencer; Johnny Roberts
- Producer: Chris Blackwell

Millie Small singles chronology
| "Don't You Know" (1963) | "My Boy Lollipop" (1964) | "Sweet William" (1964) |

Audio
- "My Boy Lollipop" on YouTube

In a 2010 interview, Island Records' founder, Chris Blackwell, told how he came to use "My Boy Lollipop" for Millie Small's fourth recording single:

I would go to New York now and again and buy records and sell them to the sound system guys in Jamaica. One of these records was the original version of 'My Boy Lollipop'. But I'd make a copy of each one on a reel-to-reel tape, it was before cassettes, and when I brought Millie over to England I sat down trying to work out if we can find a song for her and I found this tape which had the original version of 'My Boy Lollipop' and I said, 'that's the song we should do', so it was really really lucky that I found the tape.

Blackwell had purchased the original record in 1959 and found the copy in his archives in 1963. He went on to produce Small's remake, changing the spelling of the song's title to read "Lollipop" instead of "Lollypop". It was recorded in a rhythmically similar shuffle/ska/bluebeat-style, and in 1964, it became her breakthrough blockbuster hit in the United Kingdom, reaching No. 2, kept from reaching top spot by "Juliet" by the Four Pennies. The song also went to No. 1 in Ireland and No. 2 in the United States (on the Smash Record label, behind "I Get Around" by the Beach Boys). Considered the first commercially successful international ska song, Small's version of "My Boy Lollipop" sold over 7 million copies worldwide and helped to launch Island Records into mainstream popular music. It remains one of the best-selling reggae/ska hits of all time and made Small an international star at the age of 16.

The record's arrangement is credited to Ernest Ranglin, who also plays guitar on the recording. Ranglin stated, with Small's Jamaican-style vocals, he sought to develop the version into a ska tune. The saxophone solo from the original version was replaced by a harmonica solo. It is unclear who played the harmonica – urban legend credited Rod Stewart for many years, but he has denied it. Instead, it was almost certainly either Pete Hogman or Jimmy Powell, both of the Five Dimensions. Pete Hogman and Five Dimensions guitarist Kenny White both maintain it was Pete Hogman, while Jimmy Powell asserts that it was he who played this solo. In an interview with journalist Tom Graves, in the August 2016 issue of Goldmine magazine, Small insisted that it was Stewart who played the harmonica solo. Mike Wells, drummer with Cliff Adams & the Twilights, was hired by Harry Robinson (1932–1996) (Lord Rockingham's XI) and paid £7 10 shillings for the session after recording over the weekend at IBC Studios in Portland Place.

British reggae DJ David Rodigan has stated that watching Millie Small perform the song on the Ready Steady Go! TV show as a school boy initiated his lifelong passion for Jamaican music. The song featured in the 2012 Summer Olympics opening ceremony in London. It has also featured several times in the British TV series, Heartbeat.

== Chart history ==
=== Weekly charts ===
| Chart (1964) | Peak position |
|---|---|
| Argentina | 7 |
| Australia (Kent Music Report) | 2 |
| Belgium (Ultratop 50 Flanders) | 7 |
| Belgium (Ultratop 50 Wallonia) | 36 |
| Brazil | 1 |
| Canada CHUM Chart | 1 |
| Canada RPM Top Singles | 2 |
| Denmark | 5 |
| Finland (Suomen virallinen lista) | 3 |
| France (IFOP) | 93 |
| Germany (Official German Charts) | 5 |
| Ireland (IRMA) | 1 |
| Italy (Musica e dischi) | 48 |
| Netherlands (Single Top 100) | 8 |
| New Zealand (Lever Hit Parade) | 2 |
| Norway (VG-lista) | 2 |
| Singapore | 1 |
| South Africa | 1 |
| Sweden (Kvällstoppen) | 1 |
| Switzerland (Musikmarkt) | 7 |
| UK Singles Chart | 2 |
| U.S. Billboard Hot 100 | 2 |
| U.S. Cash Box Top 100 | 4 |
| West Germany (GfK) | 6 |

| Chart (1974) | Peak position |
|---|---|
| Australia (Kent Music Report) | 95 |

| Chart (1987) | Peak position |
|---|---|
| UK Singles Chart | 46 |

=== Year-end charts ===
| Chart (1964) | Rank |
|---|---|
| UK | 24 |
| U.S. Billboard Hot 100 | 46 |
| U.S. Cash Box | 71 |

== Cover versions and other uses ==
- Schlager singer Heidi Bachert recorded a cover version, under the same title but with German lyrics, which entered the West German top 20 on August 15, 1964, remaining there for 17 weeks, with No. 5 as top position. The song was remade in 1974 by Maggie Mae reaching No. 17 on the German chart.
- Mexican actress Renata Flores, early in her show business career, scored a hit in Spanish as a rock singer with her version, titled "Mi Novio Esquimal".
- A cover version by American singer Donna Hightower was recorded in French as "C'est Toi Mon Idole" in 1964 and spent time on both the Canadian and French charts.
- A cover version by Bad Manners, re-titled "My Girl Lollipop (My Boy Lollipop)", was a UK top 10 hit in July 1982.
- UK singer Lulu released a version of the song on the Jive label in 1986 which reached No. 86 on the UK Singles Chart.
- Australian singer Serena released a version in 1990. The song peaked at number 83 on the ARIA Charts.
- Czech singer Yvonne Přenosilová sang a cover called "Boty proti lásce" in Czech language. This song was famous in sociallistic Czechoslovakia.
