= The Cadillacs =

American rock and roll and doo-wop group

- Also known as: The Carnations, The Four Cadillacs, Earl Carroll and the Cadillacs, Jesse Powell and the Caddys
- Origin: Harlem, New York, United States
- Genres: Rock and roll; doo-wop
- Years active: 1953–1962, 1979-2011
- Label: Josie Records (1953–1963)
- Past members: Earl "Speedo" Carroll; Bobby Phillips; Lavern Drake; Gus Willingham; James "Poppa" Clark; Earl Wade; Charles Brooks; J. R. Bailey; Roland Martinez; Bobby Spencer; Kirk Davis; Ronnie Bright; Milton Love; Reggie Barnes; Curtis Williams; Ray Brewster; Irving Lee Gail; Leroy Binns; Johnny Brown; Antonio Van Vallen; Patty Capotorto; Clifford Stafford: Stephen Brown

The Cadillacs were an American rock and roll and doo-wop group from Harlem, New York, active from 1953 to 1962. The group was noted for their 1955 hit "Speedoo", written by Esther Navarro, which was instrumental in attracting white audiences to black rock and roll performers.

== History ==
The group came together as The Carnations in 1953, with the members Earl Carroll (lead vocalist), Bobby Phillips, Lavern Drake (bass vocalist), and Gus Willingham. As the group moved into the recording studios, James "Poppa" Clark was added as a fifth member, and the name "The Cadillacs" was given to them. The group's first recording came in July 1954, with Josie Records #765, featuring "Gloria" and "I Wonder Why."

In 1955, Willingham and Clark left the group and were replaced by Earl Wade and Charles Brooks. At this time, the group first began to experiment with choreography, suggested by manager Esther Navarro. Later that year came the group's biggest hit, "Speedoo", Carroll's nickname. Lavern Drake left the group in 1956 and was replaced by J. R. Bailey.

That same year the Cadillacs released a doo-wop version of "Rudolph the Red-Nosed Reindeer" that peaked at No. 11 on Billboard magazine's Rhythm & Blues Records chart.

In 1957, differences in opinion caused the group to split. One group was initially known as The Four Cadillacs, with current bass J. R. Bailey, former bass Lavern Drake, and new members Roland Martinez and Bobby Spencer. The previous year, Bobby Spencer had written the "My Boy Lollipop" pop song shuffle for Barbie Gaye, which was played by Alan Freed and secured Barbie Gaye a spot in his 1956 Christmas Show opening for Little Richard. In 1964, an Ernest Ranglin produced ska version of the song became a multi-million seller for Jamaican teenager Millie Small and made producer Chris Blackwell rich, leading to further development of his Island Records label.

The other four current members - Carroll, Wade, Brooks, and Phillips - continued recording separately, later as Earl Carroll and the Cadillacs. Bailey's group also included former group saxophonist Jesse "Tex" Powell, and recorded in early 1958 as Jesse Powell and the Caddys. Both groups recorded simultaneously on Josie Records. Later in 1958, the groups combined back into one. Carroll's backup vocalists, Wade, Brooks, and Phillips, all decided to retire and Carroll joined Bailey, Drake, Martinez and Spencer. Carroll's lead spot had been given to Spencer and Bailey, and he left shortly thereafter, creating a new group, Speedo and the Pearls, which recorded briefly in 1959. In 1959, the Cadillacs were also featured in the movie Go Johnny, Go.

The group split and re-formed in 1960, with Carroll, Martinez, Kirk Davis, and bass Ronnie Bright. Later the group was Carroll, Martinez, the returning Bobby Spencer, Milton Love, and Reggie Barnes. Martinez, Love and Barnes were all members of The Solitares at one time.

In 1961, the group began to resemble The Coasters in their music. The lineup shifted again, now with Carroll, Martinez, Curtis Williams, Ray Brewster, and Irving Lee Gail. Carroll was out by 1962 to enter the group they'd been emulating, The Coasters, with Carl Gardner, Billy Guy, and Will "Dub" Jones. 1963 also ended the group's run on Josie Records.

Brewster and Martinez brought in former members Bobby Spencer and J. R. Bailey and continued to record through 1963. The group split, with Bailey joining The Jive Five. Brewster brought in former Cadillac/Solitare Milton Love with Solitares Bobby Baylor and Fred Barksdale. This group recorded briefly in 1964. Spencer became lead vocalist, with Joey Levine (Ohio Express, Reunion) as backing vocalist, for Crazy Elephant, a bubblegum music group, in 1969.

The Cadillacs were back in 1970 with J. R. Bailey, Bobby Spencer, original member Bobby Phillips (who had retired from Speedo's group during the split), and new member Leroy Binns, of The Charts. Stephen Brown later replaced Phillips. The group split into the mid-1970s.

In 1979, Earl Carroll, Earl Wade, Bobby Phillips, and Johnny Brown came together for two Subaru commercials in which they sang, "Cadillac drives Subaru," as part of the automaker's "car names" campaign.

Stephen Brown had joined Cleveland Still's Dubs In the Mid-80s.

Stephen Brown died on January 20, 1989.

Carroll had remained with the Coasters during this time, and left in the 1979 to permanently re-form the Cadillacs with Phillips, Johnny Brown, Gary K. Lewis, and musical director Eddie Jones.

Johnny Brown died in 2004.

Phillips died on March 6, 2011.

Earl "Speedoo" Carroll died on November 25, 2012.

== Awards and recognition ==
The Cadillacs were inducted into The Vocal Group Hall of Fame in 2004.National Rhythm & Blues Hall of Fame in 2025

== Discography ==
=== Singles ===
Year	Titles (A-side, B-side) Both sides from same album except where indicated	Chart positions		Album
Year	Titles (A-side, B-side) Both sides from same album except where indicated	US	US R&B	Album
1954	"Don't Be Mad with My Heart" b/w "Why"			The Crazy Cadillacs
1954	"Zoom-Boom-Zing" b/w "Carelessly"			The Crazy Cadillacs
1954	"Gloria" b/w "Wonder Why" (from The Fabulous Cadillacs)			The Crazy Cadillacs
1954	"Wishing Well" b/w "I Want to Know About Love" (from For Collectors Only)			The Fabulous Cadillacs
1955	"No Chance" b/w "Sympathy"			The Fabulous Cadillacs
1955	"Down the Road" b/w "Window Lady" (from The Crazy Cadillacs)			The Fabulous Cadillacs
1955	"Speedoo" b/w "Let Me Explain" (from The Crazy Cadillacs)	17	3	The Fabulous Cadillacs
1956	"Zoom" b/w "You Are"			The Fabulous Cadillacs
1956	"Betty My Love" b/w "Woe Is Me" (from The Fabulous Cadillacs)			The Crazy Cadillacs
1956	"The Girl I Love" b/w "That's All I Need"			The Fabulous Cadillacs
1956	"Rudolph the Red-Nosed Reindeer" b/w "Shock-A-Doo" (from The Crazy Cadillacs)		11	For Collectors Only
1957	"Sugar Sugar" b/w "About That Gal Named Lou" (from For Collectors Only)			The Fabulous Cadillacs
1957	"My Girl Friend" b/w "Broken Heart"			The Crazy Cadillacs
1957	"Lucy" b/w "Hurry Home"			The Cadillacs Meet the Orioles
1957	"Buzz-Buzz-Buzz" b/w "Yea Yea Baby" (from For Collectors Only)			The Cadillacs Meet the Orioles
1958	"Speedo Is Back" b/w "A'Looka Here"			For Collectors Only
1958	"Holy Smoke Baby" b/w "I Want to Know"			For Collectors Only
1958	"Peek-A-Boo" b/w "Oh, Oh Lolita" (from For Collectors Only)	28	20	Twisting with the Cadillacs
1959	"Jay Walker" b/w "Copy Cat"			For Collectors Only
1959	"Please Mr. Johnson" b/w "Cool It Fool"			For Collectors Only
1959	"Romeo" b/w "Always My Darling" (non-album track)	105		Twisting with the Cadillacs
1959	"Bad Dan McGoon" b/w "Dumbell" (non-album track)			For Collectors Only
1960	"The Boogie Man" b/w "That's Why"			Non-album tracks
1960	"I'm Willing" b/w "Thrill Me So"			Non-album tracks
1961	"What You Bet" b/w "You Are to Blame"		30	Non-album tracks
1962	"White Gardenia" b/w "Groovy Groovy Love"			Non-album tracks
1963	"Fool" b/w "The Right Kind of Lovin'"			Non-album tracks
1963	"I Saw You" b/w "La Bomba"			Non-album tracks
1963	"I'll Never Let You Go: b/w "Wayward Wanderer"			Non-album tracks
1965	"Let's Get Together" b/w "She's My Connection"			Non-album tracks
1970	"Deep in the Heart of the Ghetto"—Part 1 b/w Part 2			Non-album tracks
