= Speedoo =

Single by The Cadillacs

from the album The Fabulous Cadillacs
- B-side: "Let Me Explain"
- Released: October 1955
- Genre: Rock and roll; doo-wop
- Length: 2:27
- Label: Josie
- Songwriter: Esther Navarro

The Cadillacs singles chronology
"Down the Road" (1955)	"Speedoo" (1955)	"Zoom" (1956)

"Speedoo" is a song written by Esther Navarro and performed by The Cadillacs featuring the Jesse Powell Orchestra. It reached number 3 on the U.S. R&B chart and number 17 on the U.S. pop chart in 1955. The song was featured on their 1957 album, The Fabulous Cadillacs. The lead vocal was by Earl Carroll.

Lyrically, the song tells of Mister Earl who acquired the nickname "Speedoo" because, when it comes to his pursuit of pretty girls, "he don't believe in wastin' time" and "he don't never take it slow".

The song was included in Robert Christgau's "Basic Record Library" of 1950s and 1960s recordings, published in Christgau's Record Guide: Rock Albums of the Seventies (1981).

== Other versions ==
- Steve Lawrence released a version of the song as the B-side to his 1955 single "The Chicken and the Hawk (Up Up and Away)".
- The Tokens released a version of the song on their 1966 album, I Hear Trumpets Blow.
- Fred Weinberg released a version of the song on his 1970 album, The Weinberg Method of Non-Synthetic Electronic Rock.
- The Youngbloods released a version of the song on their 1972 album, High on a Ridgetop.
- Brinsley Schwarz released a version of the song on their 1973 album, Please Don't Ever Change.
- Ruben and the Jets released a version of the song on their 1973 album, Con Safos.
- Ry Cooder released a version of the song on his 1980 album, Borderline.
- The Persuasions released a version of the song as part of a medley on the 2011 Frank Zappa and The Mothers of Invention album, Carnegie Hall.

== In popular culture ==
- The song was featured on the soundtrack of the 1990 film Goodfellas.
- The song was performed by The Cadillacs in the beginning of the 1998 miniseries The Temptations.
- The song was featured on the 2001 episode "Employee of the Month" of the show The Sopranos.
- The song was featured on the 2007 episode "Cadillac" of the satellite radio show Theme Time Radio Hour.
- The song's opening lyrics were referenced in the song "Was a Sunny Day" by Paul Simon, on his 1973 album, "There Goes Rhymin' Simon. In the song, Simon sings, "Her name was Lorelei/She was his only girl/She called him Speedoo, but his Christian name was Mr. Earl." Simon has often professed his affection for doo-wop music, and has acknowledged its influence on his songwriting ("I like doo-wop. I stick it in all the time," he said in a 2011 interview).
- Song was also included in the 2010 video game Mafia 2.
