= The Jive Five =

American doo-wop and R&B group (1954–2010s)

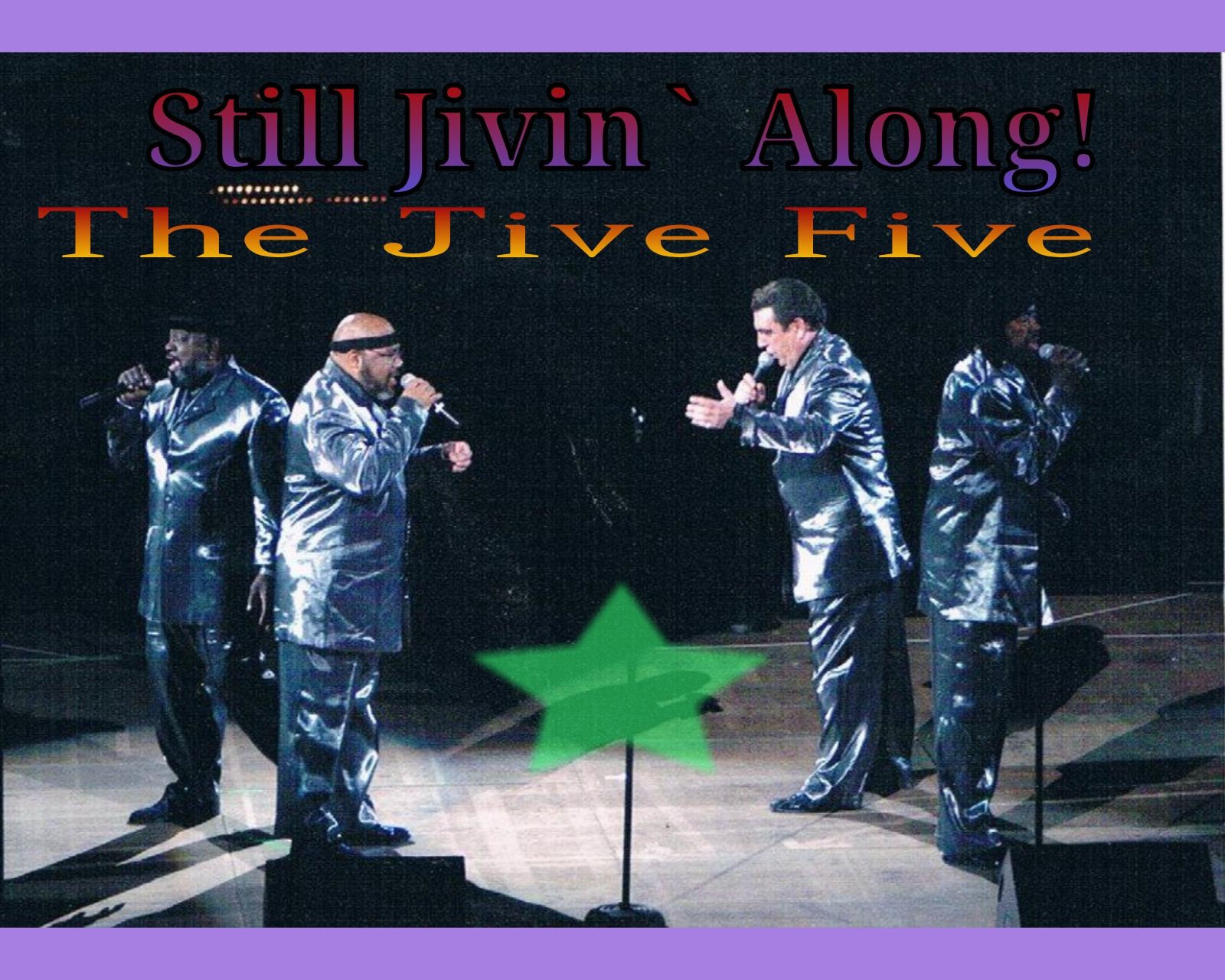
- Promotional poster for the Jive Five, performing at Meadowlands Arena in 2003

Background information
- Origin: Brooklyn, New York, U.S.
- Genres: Doo-wop; R&B
- Years active: 1954–2010s
- Labels: Bel-Tone; United Artists; Decca
- Past members: Eugene Pitt; Jerome Hanna; Richard Harris; Thurmond Prophet; Norman Johnson; Andre Coles; Casey Spencer; Beatrice Best; Richard Fisher; Webster Harris; Frank Pitt; Herbert Pitt; Maurice Unthank; Art Loria; Danny Loria; Harold Gilly

The Jive Five were an American doo-wop group. They are best known for their 1961 hit single "My True Story" and their work on ID jingles for the Nickelodeon network in the late 1980s, which would be reused until 1992.

Their classic doo-wop recordings of "My True Story" (1961) and "Beggin' You Please" (1962) were among the best (and last) of the modern doo-wop era, which lasted roughly from 1954 to 1962. The doo-wop era, including the so called "girl groups", was preempted by the British Invasion, which began in early 1964.

== Career ==
The group formed in Brooklyn, New York, in 1954 as "The Genies", with Eugene Pitt, Jerome Hanna, Richard Harris, Thurmond Prophet (also known as Billy Prophet), and Norman Johnson. The group, by then renamed "The Jive Five", found chart success in 1961 with "My True Story" on Bel-Tone Records, which reached No. 3 on the Billboard Hot 100 and topped the Hot R&B Singles chart for three weeks.

The group reorganized following the death of Hanna in 1962, with Pitt, Johnson, Hanna's replacement Andre Coles, Casey Spencer, and Beatrice Best. They recorded "What Time is It", "Never, Never", and "These Golden Rings" for Bel-Tone, before switching to United Artists Records, where they had a hit with "I'm a Happy Man". In 1970, the group moved to Decca Records and recorded as "The Jyve Fyve", with Pitt, Spencer, Richard Fisher, and Richard Harris's brother Webster. They had a minor hit with this name, "I Want You to Be My Baby", on Decca.

The group was constantly active on the oldies circuit. In 1983, Eugene hired his brothers, Frank and Herbert Pitt, and in 1985 Casey Spencer rejoined the touring act. They performed along with Beatrice Best. In the '90s, Maurice Unthank performed as keyboard player.

In 1984, Eugene and the Jive Five were introduced to New York cable TV branding consultants Fred Seibert and Alan Goodman (and their company Fred/Alan Inc.) by their latest producer, Ambient Sound's Marty Pekar. Together with Fred/Alan producer Tom Pomposello, they embarked on an almost ten-year relationship, creating and singing the a cappella signature sound of the American kids' television network Nickelodeon, one of the first popular "network" specialized cable television channels. They used the group to write and record some of the station's advertising jingles Pomposello later recruited the Jive Five to work on HBO Family's network branding in 1999.

The group performed on the PBS special Doo Wop 50. The line-up was Pitt, Spencer, Richard Harris, Best, and a fifth member. Between 2000 and 2006, the line-up was led by Pitt on lead vocals, Beatrice Best, Artie Loria (formerly of The Belmonts and Earls), Danny Loria and Harold Gilly. Maurice Unthank took over as bandleader. The group released a single in 2016 entitled "It's Christmas", written by Pitt and the Lorias. It was credited to "Eugene Pitt and the Jive Five".

Pitt, as one of the founding members with Artie and Danny Loria, was active performing and recording with The Doo Wop All Stars between 1990 and 2006. The group recorded a tribute song to the September 11 attacks victims and heroes, named "We Will Never Fall". It was a Jive Five release in 2001 that was credited to the group "Voices for America".

In June 2010, the group consisted of the then 72-year-old Eugene Pitt, first tenor Frank Pitt, second tenor Casey Spencer, baritone Beatrice Best, and bass Herbert Pitt.

== Deaths ==
Norman Johnson died in 1970. Jerome Hanna died in 1962 from pneumonia. Webster Harris died in 2003. Maurice Unthank died on July 21, 2008. Artie Loria died on October 23, 2010. Beatrice Best died on September 15, 2014, at the age of 81. Founding member Eugene Pitt (born on November 6, 1937) died on June 29, 2018, at the age of 80. Casey Spencer died on October 27, 2025, at the age of 84.

== Singles ==
Year	Title	Chart positions		
Year	Title	US	US R&B	CAN
1961	"My True Story"	3	1	—
1961	"Never, Never"	74	—	—
1962	"These Golden Rings"	—	27	—
1962	"Hully Gully Callin' Time"	105	—	—
1962	"What Time Is It?"	67	—	—
1963	"Rain"	128	—	—
1965	"I'm a Happy Man"	26	36	12
1965	"A Bench in the Park"	106	—	—
1967	"Crying Like a Baby"	127	—	—
1968	"Sugar (Don't Take Away My Candy)"	119	34	—
2006	"It's Christmas"	157	119	—
