= The Harptones =

American doo-wop group

- Origin: New York City, U.S.
- Genres: Doo-wop; pop
- Years active: 1953–2014

The Harptones are an American doo-wop group which formed in Manhattan, New York in 1953.

The group never had a top forty pop hit, or a record on the US Billboard R&B chart, yet they are known for both their lead singer Willie Winfield and their pianist/arranger, Raoul Cita. The Harptones recorded for Coed Records and other labels. The Harptones may have been the first doo-wop group to have a full-time arranger among their members, and Cita knew how to work to Winfield's strengths. Their best-known recordings include "A Sunday Kind of Love" (1953), "Why Should I Love You?" (1954), "Life is But a Dream" (1955), "The Shrine of St. Cecilia" (1956), and "What Will I Tell My Heart" (1961).

In 1956, they recorded some songs for the film Rockin' the Blues: "Mambo Boogie", "Ou Wee Baby", and "High Flying Baby".

The song "Life is But a Dream" was featured in the 1990 film GoodFellas; it appears on the film's soundtrack album.

== Members ==
=== 1951–1954 ===
- Willie Winfield (lead)
- Billy Brown (bass)
- Claudie "Nicky" Clark (first tenor)
- William Dempsey (second tenor)
- William "Dicey" Galloway (baritone)
- Raoul Cita (piano; baritone)

=== Early 1955 ===
- Willie Winfield (lead)
- Billy Brown (bass)
- Claudie "Nicky" Clark (first tenor)
- William Dempsey (second tenor)
- Freddy Taylor (baritone)
- Raoul Cita (piano; baritone)

Dicey Galloway was drafted in November 1954.

=== Late 1955 ===
- Willie Winfield (tenor)
- Billy Brown (bass)
- Claudie "Nicky" Clark
- William Dempsey (second tenor)
- Bernard "Jimmy" Beckum (baritone)
- Raoul Cita (piano; baritone)

=== Early 1956 ===
- Willie Winfield (tenor)
- Bobby Spencer
- William Dempsey (second tenor)
- Bernard "Jimmy" Beckum (baritone)
- Raoul Cita (piano; baritone)

=== 1956 movie Rockin' The Blues ===
- Willie Winfield (tenor)
- Freddy Taylor
- Billy Brown
- William Dempsey (second tenor)
- Raoul Cita (piano; baritone)

=== Early 1957 ===
- Willie Winfield (tenor)
- Billy Brown
- William Dempsey (second tenor)
- William "Dicey" Galloway
- Toni Williams
- Raoul Cita (piano; baritone)

Billy Brown died of a drug overdose in spring 1957.

=== Late 1958 ===
- Willie Winfield (tenor)
- William Dempsey (second tenor)
- William "Dicey" Galloway
- Toni Williams
- Curtis Cherebin

Dicey Galloway left in October and was replaced by Milton Love of The Solitares for a short time, before splitting. Galloway died on July 18, 2017, in Houghs Neck in Quincy, Massachusetts at age 84 after suffering from multiple illnesses.

=== 1959–1963 ===
- Willie Winfield
- Nicky Clark
- William Dempsey
- Curtis Cherebin
- Raoul Cita

Nicky Clark left after a few months, to be replaced by Wilbur "Yonkie" Paul, who was in turn replaced by Hank "Pompi" Jernigan.

=== Early 1964 ===
- Willie Winfield
- Nicky Clark
- William Dempsey
- Jimmy Beckum
- Raoul Cita

=== Late 1964 ===
- Nicky Clark
- William Dempsey
- Curtis Cherebin
- Hank "Pompi" Jernigan
- Raoul Cita

Nicky Clark died In July 1978, at the age of 43.

=== 1970–1972 ===
- Willie Winfield
- Curtis Cherebin
- Jimmy Beckum
- William Dempsey
- Raoul Cita

=== 1972–mid-1990s ===
- Willie Winfield
- Marlowe Murray
- Linda Champion
- Raoul Cita

=== Mid 1990s–1999 ===
- Willie Winfield
- Marlowe Murray
- Linda Champion
- William Dempsey
- Raoul Cita

The line-up appeared on Doo Wop 50. Linda Champion left due to health problems around 2000.

=== 2000–2008 ===
- Willie Winfield
- Marlowe Murray
- Vicki Burgess
- William Dempsey
- Raoul Cita

=== 2008–2014 ===
- Willie Winfield
- Don Cruz
- Vicki Burgess
- William Dempsey
- Raoul Cita
- Tommie Shider

== Legacy ==
Billy Brown died of a drug overdose in 1957.

Marlowe Murray died on December 11, 2008, from cancer, at the age of 73.

Raoul J. Cita died on December 13, 2014, from liver and stomach cancer, at the age of 86.

Willie Winfield died from a heart attack on July 27, 2021, aged 91.

William Dempsey is the only original surviving member of The Harptones.

== Awards and recognition ==
The Harptones were featured more times than any other group in the United in Group Harmony Association's official top 500 vocal group recordings list, compiled 1996–2000. They were inducted into The Vocal Group Hall of Fame in 2002.
