= Earl Carroll (vocalist) =

- Also known as: Speedo
- Born: November 2, 1937
- Died: November 25, 2012 (aged 75) New York City, New York, U.S.
- Genre: Doo-wop
- Occupation: Vocalist
- Years active: 1950s–2000s

Earl "Speedo" Carroll (November 2, 1937 – November 25, 2012) was the lead vocalist of the doo-wop group The Cadillacs. The group's biggest hit was "Speedoo", which with a minor spelling change became Carroll's subsequent nickname. It was released in 1955. He joined The Coasters in 1961, leaving the group in the early 1980s to permanently reform The Cadillacs.

In 1982, Earl took a job as a custodian at the PS 87 elementary school in New York City and worked there until retiring in 2005. A popular figure with the students, he was chosen to be the subject of a children's book, That's Our Custodian, by Ann Morris (Brookfield, Connecticut: Millbrook Press). The publicity helped him to revive his career. He became a mainstay of the PBS series honoring doo wop, hosted by Jerry Butler and continued performing until the early 2010s when deteriorating health forced him to retire.

== Death ==
Carroll died on November 25, 2012, of complications from a stroke and diabetes.
