= The Chantels =

American band

- Origin: The Bronx, New York, United States
- Genres: Pop, doo wop, rock and roll
- Years active: 1957–1970, 1999–present
- Members: Sonia Goring Wilson; Renée Minus White; Lois Harris Powell; *Naomi White Randolph
- Past members: Arlene Smith; Jackie Landry Jackson; Annette Smith; Sandra Dawn; Helen Liebowitz Powell; Yvonne Fair; Ami Ortiz; Olive Joseph; Ghanniyya Green; Alice Marie Collins

The Chantels are a pop music group and are the third African-American girl group to enjoy nationwide success in the United States, preceded by The Teen Queens and The Bobbettes. The group was established in the early 1950s by students attending St. Anthony of Padua Church and school in the Bronx.

The original five members consisted of Arlene Smith (lead, October 5, 1941 – July 29, 2026), Sonia Goring Wilson (born Millicent Goring, 1940), Renée Minus White (born 1943), Jackie Landry Jackson (May 22, 1941 – December 23, 1997), and Lois Harris (born 1940). They derived their name from that of Jane Frances de Chantal.

They are considered to be among the first girl groups.

== Career ==
In 1957 the Chantels, then in high school, had been singing as a group for several years. Unlike some Black groups whose influences were based in gospel, the quintet was influenced by classical music and Latin hymns. Lead singer Arlene Smith had received classical training and performed at Carnegie Hall at age 12. She provided both lyrics and music. The girls were discovered by Richard Barrett, lead singer of the Valentines, and by the summer of 1957 they were signed to End Records, owned by George Goldner. Their first single was "He's Gone" (Pop No. 71) in August 1957, written by Arlene Smith. Released in December 1957, their second single, "Maybe," was a hit (No. 15 Billboard Hot 100; No. 2 R&B chart) in January 1958. It sold over a million copies and was awarded a gold disc. The following releases were less successful but End did release an album originally titled We Are the Chantels. The original cover had a photo of the group. That album was soon withdrawn and repackaged with a picture of two white teenagers picking out a song; the title was shortened to The Chantels.

The group was dropped by End in 1959, and Arlene Smith embarked upon a solo career. Harris left to pursue a college education. That year Chantels singles led by Richard Barrett were released on the End subsidiary label, Gone. In 1960 Annette Smith (no relation to Arlene) replaced Arlene Smith. As a quartet, the group moved to Carlton Records, where they had their second hit with "Look in My Eyes" (No. 14 pop, No. 6 R&B). Other releases on Carlton did not do as well. One song was "Well I Told You," a response to the Ray Charles song "Hit the Road, Jack," which stalled at No. 29 pop. A Carlton album was released in 1962 titled The Chantels on Tour but featured no live recordings and only seven tracks were recorded by the actual group. The other three tracks were by Gus Backus, Chris Montez and Little Anthony & the Imperials. To cash in on "Look in My Eyes", End threw together an album titled There's Our Song Again, a compilation of previously recorded material.

The Chantels switched record labels a few more times. Although personnel changed throughout the 1960s, the constants in the group were Jackie Landry, Sonia Goring and Renee Minus. This line-up, plus Arlene Smith, recorded a one-off single for RCA in 1970. Smith fronted a new group called Chantels in the 1970s which featured up-and-coming disco diva Carol Douglas and former Gems vocalist Louise Bethune (who would also become a 1970s performing member of the Crystals). Smith continued to perform solo. In 1995 the remaining original Chantels reformed as well and hired Noemi (Ami) Ortiz as their lead singer. On the PBS special Doo Wop 50, Smith reunited with the surviving original members of the Chantels and dedicated "Maybe" to Jackie Landry, who died in 1997.

The Chantels were inducted into the Vocal Group Hall of Fame in 2002. In 2001 and 2009 they made the final ballot for induction into the Rock and Roll Hall of Fame, but without enough votes for induction.

== Discography ==
=== Albums ===
- We Are the Chantels (End Records, 1958)
- There's Our Song Again (End Records, 1961)
- The Chantels on Tour (Carlton Records, 1962)

=== Singles ===
Year	Titles (A-side, B-side) Both sides from same album except where indicated	Peak chart positions			Album
Year	Titles (A-side, B-side) Both sides from same album except where indicated	US	US R&B	CAN CHUM	Album
1957	"He's Gone" b/w "The Plea"	71	—	—	We Are the Chantels
1958	"Maybe" b/w "Come My Little Baby"	15	2	1	We Are the Chantels
1958	"Every Night (I Pray)" b/w "Whoever You Are"	40	16	16	We Are the Chantels
1958	"I Love You So" b/w "How Could You Call It Off" (Non-album track)	42	12	—	We Are the Chantels
1958	"If You Try" b/w "Congratulations"	—	—	—	We Are the Chantels
1958	"Prayee" b/w "Sure of Love" (from We Are the Chantels)	—	—	—	Non-album tracks
1959	"I Can't Take It" b/w "Never Let Go" (from There's Our Song Again)	—	—	—	Non-album tracks
1959	"Summer's Love" b/w "All Is Forgiven"	93	29	—	Non-album tracks
1959	"Goodbye to Love" b/w "I'm Confessin' (That I Love You)"	—	—	—	There's Our Song Again
1960	"How Could You Call It Off" b/w "Whoever You Are" (from We Are the Chantels)	—	—	—	Non-album track
1961	"Look in My Eyes" b/w "Glad to Be Back"	14	6	15	On Tour
1961	"I'm the Girl" b/w "There's Our Song Again"	—	—	—	There's Our Song Again
1961	"Well I Told You" b/w "Still"	29	—	—	On Tour
1962	"Here It Comes Again" b/w "Summertime"	—	—	—	On Tour
1963	"Eternally" b/w "Swamp Water"	77	—	—	Non-album tracks
1966	"There's No Forgetting You" b/w "Take Me as I Am"	—	—	—	Non-album tracks
1966	"You're Welcome to My Heart" b/w "Soul of a Soldier"	—	—	—	Non-album tracks
1966	"Indian Giver" b/w "It's Just Me"	—	—	—	Non-album tracks
1969	"Maybe" b/w "He's Gone"	—	—	—	We Are The Chantels
1970	"Love Makes All the Difference in the World" b/w "I'm Gonna Win Him Back"	—	—	—	Non-album tracks
"—" denotes releases that did not chart or were not released in that territory.

== Bibliography ==
- Clemente, John (2000). Girl Groups -- Fabulous Females That Rocked The World, Iola, Wisconsin, Krause Publications. p. 276. ISBN 0-87341-816-6.
- Clemente, John (2013). Girl Groups -- Fabulous Females Who Rocked The World, Bloomington, Indiana, Authorhouse Publications. p. 623. ISBN 978-1-4772-7633-4 (sc); ISBN 978-1-4772-8128-4 (e).
