= Millie Small =

Jamaican singer (1947–2020)

Millie Small CD
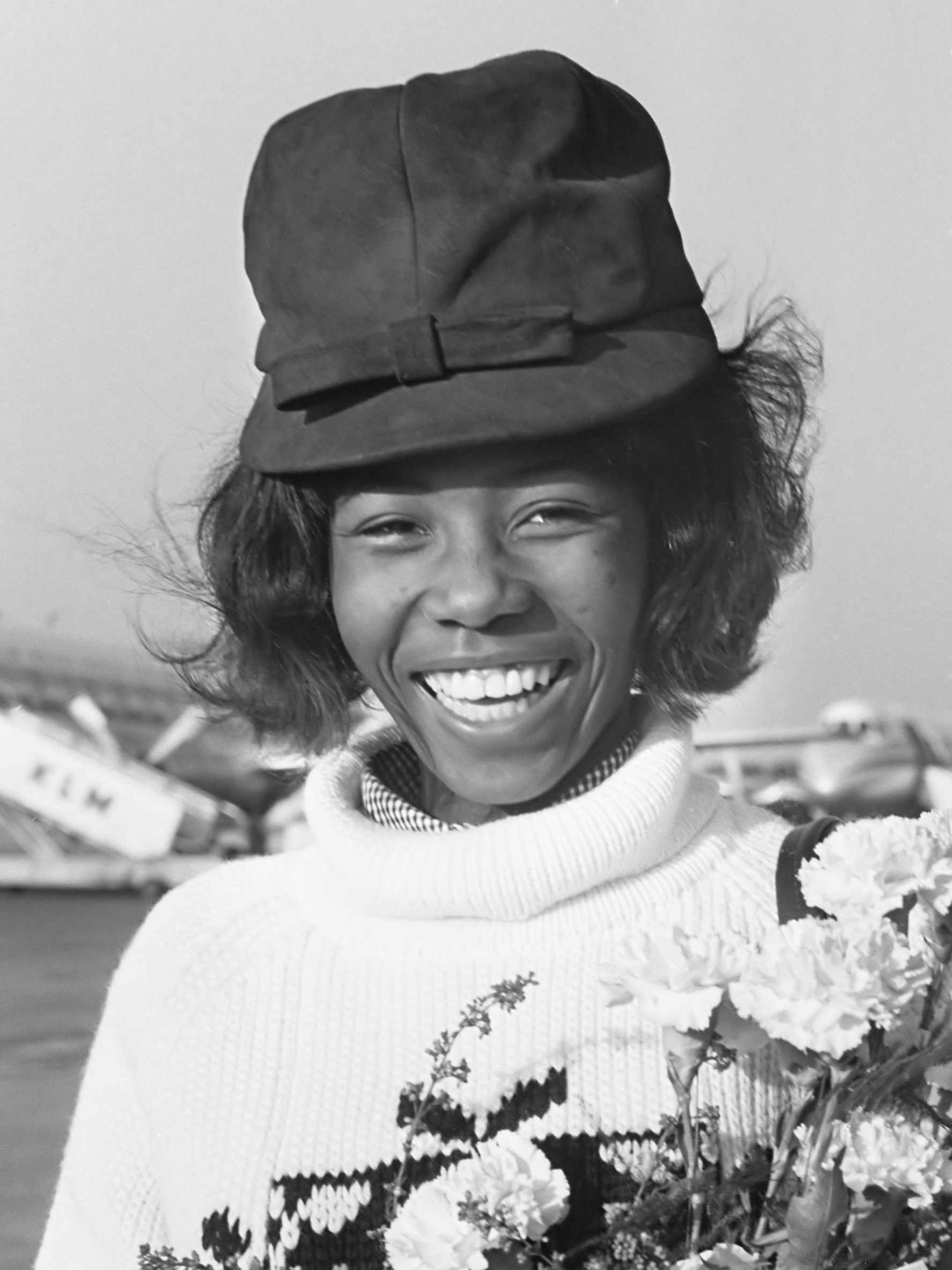
- Small arriving at Schiphol Airport from Jamaica in 1964

Background information
- Also known as: Millie, Little Millie Small, Millie Small
- Born: Millicent Dolly May Small; 6 October 1947; Clarendon, Colony of Jamaica
- Died: 5 May 2020 (aged 72) London, England
- Genres: Ska; reggae
- Occupation: Singer
- Years active: 1962–1972
- Labels: Studio One; Fontana; Island; Trojan

Millicent Dolly May Small CD (6 October 1947 – 5 May 2020) was a Jamaican singer who is best known for her international hit "My Boy Lollipop" (1964). The song reached number two in both the UK and US charts and sold over seven million copies worldwide. It was also the first major hit for Island Records and helped to achieve the label its mainstream success. She was the Caribbean's first international recording star and its most successful female performer.

== Early life and career ==
Millicent Dolly May Small was born on 6 October 1947 in Clarendon, Jamaica, the daughter of a sugar plantation overseer. She was one of 13 siblings, with seven brothers and five sisters. Like many Jamaican singers of the era, her career began by winning the Vere Johns Opportunity Hour talent contest at the age of twelve. Wishing to pursue a career as a singer, she moved to live with relatives in Love Lane in Kingston. She auditioned for Studio One record producer Coxsone Dodd, who was struck by the similarity of her voice to that of Shirley Goodman of the American duo Shirley and Lee. He paired her with singer Owen Gray, and they made several records together, including "Sugar Plum", which became a local hit.

When Gray resumed his solo career, Small began recording with another singer, Samuel Augustus "Roy" Panton. Working with producer Roy Robinson, the duo of Roy & Millie had a run of local hits, including "We'll Meet". They had further successes working with Dodd, as well with producer Lindon Pottinger, including the local hit "Marie" in 1963; and then with Prince Buster. Her popularity brought her to the attention of Anglo-Jamaican entrepreneur Chris Blackwell, who was convinced of her wider international potential, and became her manager and legal guardian. In late 1963 he took her to Forest Hill, London, where she was given intensive training in dancing and diction.

== International success ==
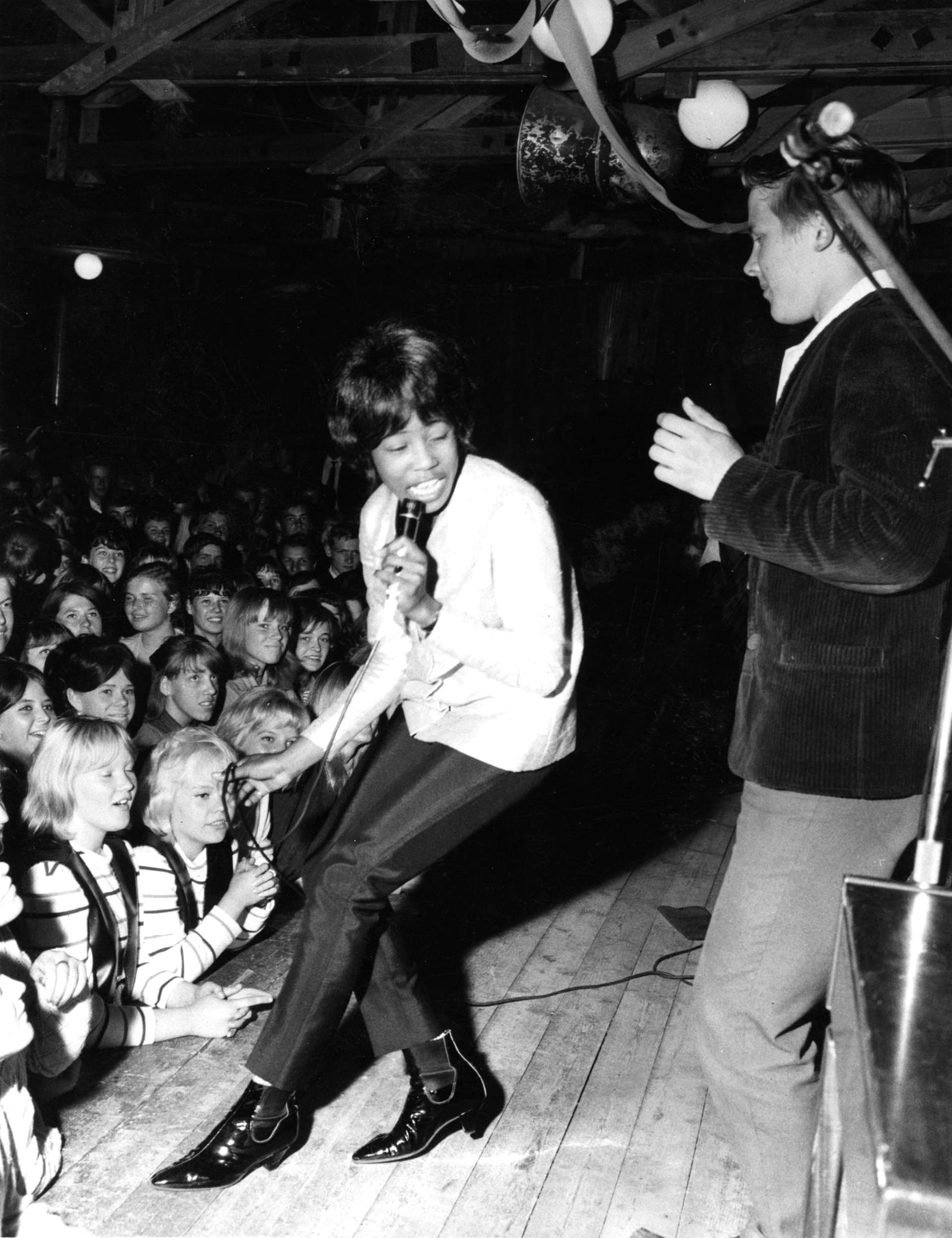
Millie Small performing in Helsinki, Finland in December 1964

Her first recording in London, "Don't You Know", made little impact when released by Fontana Records in late 1963, but for her next recording Blackwell recruited guitarist and arranger Ernest Ranglin to oversee the session. Ranglin and his musicians adopted the newly-popular ska style, and his rearrangement of "My Boy Lollipop", a song originally released in the US by teenager Barbie Gaye in late 1956, became immediately successful. Released in March 1964, Small's version (on which she was credited simply as "Millie") was a massive hit. She appeared on British TV shows including Top of the Pops, and the single reached number two in the UK Singles Chart, in the US Billboard Hot 100, and in Canada. It also topped the chart in Australia. Initially it sold over 600,000 copies in the United Kingdom. Including singles sales, album usage, and compilation inclusions, the song has since sold more than seven million copies worldwide and made Small an international star at the age of 17.

"My Boy Lollipop" was doubly significant in British pop history. It was the first major hit for Island Records (although it was actually released on the Fontana label because Chris Blackwell, Island's owner, did not want to overextend its then-meagre resources; in the US, the record appeared on the Smash Records subsidiary of Mercury Records). Small was the first artist to have a hit that was recorded in the bluebeat style, a music genre that was a direct ancestor of reggae. She was billed as "The Blue Beat Girl" on the single's label in the US.

She toured in Britain and appeared frequently on British television, before collapsing from exhaustion and food poisoning; she was also involved in a traffic accident. Although her next single, "Sweet William", was less successful, reaching number 30 in the UK, number 40 in the US, and number 22 in Canada, she had become an international celebrity. She was given a gold disc in New York, and was driven in an open-top car on her return to Kingston where she performed in several major shows, on one occasion topping the bill over Otis Redding, Patti LaBelle, and Inez and Charlie Foxx. She also performed in a Ska Spectacular show at the 1964 New York World's Fair.

Her first album, More Millie, contained a varied selection of songs arranged by Ranglin. In the US it was issued as My Boy Lollipop, with a slightly different selection of tracks. Her early Jamaican recordings were also reissued to take advantage of her popularity. She appeared on the 1964 Beatles TV special Around the Beatles. On 28 December 1964 she also appeared in ITV's Play of the Week episode "The Rise and Fall of Nellie Brown", playing the role of Selina Brown. The play features a number of songs composed by Dolores Claman and performed by Small.

In early 1965, she featured in a Ready, Steady, Go! special, Millie in Jamaica, and soon afterwards she embarked on a world tour, with concerts in New Zealand, Australia, Hong Kong, Singapore, Japan, the US, Brazil and Argentina. On 6 March 1965, Small appeared on the Australian television programme Bandstand. This was as part of a concert at the Sidney Myer Music Bowl in Kings Domain, Melbourne, part of the Moomba Festival. She performed "My Boy Lollipop", "What Am I Living For", and "See You Later, Alligator".

She recorded several duets with Jackie Edwards in 1965, as well as solo material, but sales were disappointing. She also released her second LP record, Millie Sings Fats Domino, but it failed to reach the charts. Her eighth single in Britain, a version of Wynonie Harris' "Bloodshot Eyes", was her last UK chart success, reaching number 48 in late 1965, but she continued to tour successfully in Australia and Africa. After returning to Britain she made further recordings with Jackie Edwards, including the album Pledging My Love, and also appeared on the compilation album Ska at the Jamaica Playboy Club, singing on one track with the then-unknown Jimmy Cliff. However, her popularity in Britain appeared to dwindle as she spent more time touring abroad. In 1968, after two albums of The Best of Jackie & Millie, her recording contracts with Island and Fontana ended.

The emergence of reggae in the United Kingdom in 1969 prompted a return to recording for Small, with the single "My Love and I", on which she was backed by the band Symarip. She then recorded for the Trojan label, her first single combining a version of Nick Drake's "Mayfair" with her own song, the politically-inspired and defiant "Enoch Power", which faced a radio ban but re-established her profile among the British Caribbean community. However, after a short period with President Records, she ended her recording career soon afterwards.

Small continued to tour and perform in Jamaica, but in 1971 decided to move to Singapore to live. She returned to Britain in 1973, to coincide with the release of another compilation album, Lollipop Reggae. Thereafter, she largely stayed out of the public eye, even when "My Boy Lollipop" was reissued and re-charted in the UK in 1987 at number 46 to celebrate Island Records' 25th anniversary.

== Later life ==
In 1987, during a rare interview with Thames News, it was revealed that Small was penniless and had taken to living in a hostel with her toddler daughter Jaelee. In November 1987, she made a rare public appearance in Jamaica to receive the Medal of Appreciation from Prime Minister Edward Seaga. In 2006, she was said to be making new recordings after some years spent writing, painting, and raising her daughter.

On 6 August 2011, the 49th anniversary of Jamaica's independence, the Governor-General made Small a Commander in the Order of Distinction for her contribution to the Jamaican music industry. The award was accepted on her behalf by Seaga. In July 2012, she again stated that she had been recording again and planned to perform in Jamaica for the first time in over 40 years.

After nearly forty years away from the limelight and refusing most interview requests, Small granted U.S. journalist Tom Graves the first ever in-depth interview in the August 2016 edition of Goldmine. Previous interviews were typically short and based on press releases. In the interview she discusses fully her early career and the full impact of "My Boy Lollipop". She also insisted, against the denials of Rod Stewart, that it was Stewart who played harmonica on "My Boy Lollipop". She said she remembered the sessions well and recalls Stewart being asked to play. Small also said in 2016 that she had not received any royalties for the single.

== Personal life ==
She had a brief relationship with Peter Asher of the 1960s duo Peter & Gordon. In her August 2016 interview with U.S. journalist Tom Graves, she said the relationship had been platonic.

She lived in Singapore from 1971 to 1973 before returning to the United Kingdom, where she lived for the remainder of her life. In 1984, she had a daughter, Jaelee, who studied art and music and is a singer-songwriter.

== Death ==
Small died on 5 May 2020 in London, from a stroke, aged 72. News of her death was first announced to the Jamaica Observer by Island Records founder Chris Blackwell, who last met Small some 12 years before her death. He remembered her as "a very special sweet person" with a "great sense of humour". Blackwell also credited her for popularising ska on an international level from 1964 as "it was her first hit record".

== Discography ==
=== Albums ===
- My Boy Lollipop (1964, UK: Fontana, US: Smash)
- More Millie (1964, UK: Fontana)
- The Most Of Millie (And The Boys) (1964, Jamaica: WIRL (West Indies Records Limited)
- Sings Fats Domino (1965, UK: Fontana, 1966, Canada: Stone Records)
- The Best of Millie Small (1967, UK: Island Records)
- Time Will Tell (1970/2004, Trojan)
- My Boy Lollipop and 31 Other Songs (1994, DE: Combo Records)

=== Singles ===
Year	Single	Label
1963	"Don't You Know" / "Until You're Mine"	Fontana
1964	"My Boy Lollipop" / "Something's Gotta Be Done"	Fontana
1964	"Sweet William" / "Oh, Henry"	Fontana
1964	"I Love the Way You Love" / "Bring It On Home to Me"	Fontana
1965	"I've Fallen in Love with a Snowman" / "What Am I Living For"	Fontana
1965	"See You Later, Alligator" / "Chilly Kisses"	Fontana
1965	"My Street" / "It's Too Late"	Fontana
1965	"Bloodshot Eyes" / "Tongue Tied"	Fontana
1966	"My Street" / "Mixed Up, Fickle, Lonely, Self-Centred, Spoiled Kind of Boy"	Brit./Atco
1966	"Killer Joe" / "Carry Go Bring Come"	Fontana
1967	"You Better Forget" / "I Am in Love"	Island
1967	"Chicken Feed" / "Wings of a Dove"	Fontana
1968	"When I Dance with You" / "Hey Mr. Love"	Fontana
1969	"My Love and I" / "Tell Me All About Yourself"	Pyramid
1969	"Readin' Writin' Arithmetic" / "I Want You Never to Stop"	Decca
1970	"Mayfair" / "Enoch Power"	Trojan

== See also ==
- Caribbean music in the United Kingdom
- List of performers on Top of the Pops
- List of reggae musicians
- List of ska musicians
- List of stage names
- Music of Jamaica
