= Down in Mexico =

Single by The Coasters

from the album The Coasters
- B-side: "Turtle Dovin'"
- Released: 1956
- Genre: Doo-wop
- Length: 3:15
- Label: Atco
- Songwriter: Jerry Leiber, Mike Stoller

The Coasters singles chronology
| "Down in Mexico" (1956) | "One Kiss Led to Another" (1956) |

"Down in Mexico" is the debut single by the American vocal group the Coasters, released in 1956. The song was written by Jerry Leiber and Mike Stoller and appears on the 1957 compilation album The Coasters. It reached No. 8 on the Billboard R&B chart in 1956.

== Personnel ==
Credits adapted from The Coasters LP liner notes:

The Coasters

- Carl Gardner – lead tenor vocal
- Billy Guy – baritone vocal
- Bobby Nunn – bass vocal
- Leon Hughes – tenor vocal
- Adolph Jacobs – guitar

Credits adapted from The Coasters: The Complete Singles As & Bs 1954-62 CD liner notes:

Additional musicians

- Mike Stoller – piano
- Gil Bernal – saxophone
- Barney Kessel – guitar
- Ralph Hamilton – bass
- Jesse Sailes – drums
- Chico Guerrero – congas
