= Framed (Leiber and Stoller song) =

1954 rap song

Framed is a song written by Jerry Leiber and Mike Stoller. It was originally recorded by The Robins in August 1954, in Los Angeles and released on Leiber and Stoller's label Spark Records in October of that year as the B side of Loop De Loop Mambo. Jerry Leiber talks about the song, saying, "Another rap took the form of a police drama. We called it "Framed" and gave it a subtext that, despite the humor, refers to the legal brutality that impacted the black community".

== Personnel ==
- Billy Richards, Roy Richards, Ty Tyrell, Bobby Nunn, Carl Gardner, vocals
- Mike Stoller, piano
- Gil Bernal, saxophone
- Barney Kessell, guitar
- Ralph Hamilton, bass
- Jesse Sailes, drums

In 1955, the Robins disagreed over whether to remain on the West Coast or sign with Atlantic Records and move to the East Coast. This led to a split within the group. Music producers and songwriters Jerry Leiber and Mike Stoller took former Robins members Nunn and Carl Gardner, recruited singers Leon Hughes and Billy Guy, and formed the Coasters. The founding Richards brothers and Tyrell continued to record as the Robins until 1961.

== Other versions ==
The song has been covered by Ritchie Valens (1958), Lowell George and The Factory (with some lyrics changed, 1969), Jerry Reed 'KO-KO JOE' (1970), the Sensational Alex Harvey Band (1972) and Cheech & Chong (with some lyrics changed, 1976). In 1977, Canadian rocker, lead singer of The Guess Who, Burton Cummings released a wonderful cover on his album My Own Way to Rock.
