= Young Blood (The Coasters song) =

1957 single by The Coasters

Single by The Coasters
- B-side: "Searchin'"
- Released: March 1957
- Recorded: February 15, 1957
- Genre: Rhythm and blues
- Length: 2:15
- Label: Atco 6087
- Songwriters: Jerry Leiber and Mike Stoller, Doc Pomus
- Producer: Jerry Leiber and Mike Stoller

The Coasters singles chronology
"One Kiss Led to Another" (1956)	"Young Blood" (1957)	"Idol with the Golden Head" (1957)

"Young Blood" is a song written by Doc Pomus along with the songwriting team Jerry Leiber and Mike Stoller that first became a hit by The Coasters in 1957.

== Structure ==
Musically, the song follows a minor blues structure, built mostly around three chords (i7, iv7, V7) except for the bridge (IV, VI, III, V). The lyrical theme is one typical of early rock and roll: boy meets girl, then meets girl's father, who does not approve of boy; so the boy departs, but cannot stop thinking about the girl, declaring "You're the one, you're the one, you're the one."

== The Coasters version ==
"Young Blood" was originally recorded by The Coasters and released as a single together with "Searchin'" in March 1957 by Atco Records (#6087). This song is compared to the cleaner cut song "Standing on the Corner" from the musical The Most Happy Fella. Their version can also be heard on The Very Best of the Coasters album. It topped Billboard's R&B chart and reached #8 on the Billboard Hot 100.

The Coasters' version is ranked #414 on Rolling Stone's list of the 500 Greatest Songs of All Time, the group's only song on the list.

The song was included in the musical revue Smokey Joe's Cafe.

=== Charts ===
==== Weekly charts ====
Chart (1957)	Peak position
US Billboard Hot 100	8
US R&B (Billboard)	1
US Cash Box Top 100	15

==== Year-end charts ====
Chart (1957)	Rank
US Billboard Hot 100	70

=== Personnel ===
- Mike Stoller, piano
- Gil Bernal, saxophone
- Barney Kessell, guitar
- probably Adolph Jacobs, guitar
- Ralph Hamilton, bass
- Jesse Sailes, drums
- A.L. "Abe" Stoller, drums
- Joe Olivera, congas
- possibly Chico Guerrero, congas

== The Beatles version ==
"Young Blood"

Song by the Beatles

from the album Live at the BBC
- Released: November 30, 1994
- Recorded: June 1, 1963
- Genre: Rock and roll, R&B
- Length: 1:56
- Label: Apple
- Songwriter: Leiber/Stoller/Pomus
- Producer: Terry Henebery

The Beatles played "Young Blood" in their Cavern Club repertoire. It is one of twelve songs recorded by them in July 1962 on a tape, which was re-purchased by Paul McCartney at a Sotheby's auction in 1985.

A previously unreleased version performed by The Beatles (for the BBC radio show Pop Go the Beatles broadcast on June 11, 1963) is included on their album Live at the BBC, released in 1994. It was recorded at the BBC Paris Studio, London on June 1, 1963, and George Harrison is the lead vocalist on this recording; the tempo is moderately fast, considerably faster than in the original.

=== Personnel ===
- George Harrison – lead vocals, lead guitar
- John Lennon – backing vocals, rhythm guitar
- Paul McCartney – backing vocals, bass guitar
- Ringo Starr – drums

Personnel per The Beatles Bible

== Bad Company version ==
"Young Blood"

Single by Bad Company

from the album Run with the Pack
- B-side: "Do Right by Your Woman"
- Released: March 1976
- Recorded: 1975
- Genre: Rock
- Length: 2:37
- Label: Swan Song
- Songwriter: Leiber/Stoller/Pomus
- Producer: Bad Company

Bad Company singles chronology
"Feel Like Makin' Love" (1975)	"Young Blood" (1976)	"Honey Child" (1976)

Bad Company recorded the song on their 1976 LP Run with the Pack. It was released as a single, reaching the Top 20 in the United States and the Top 10 in Canada.

Cash Box called it "a straight ahead rock-out version of a great song." Record World said that "The group recaptures the flippant attitude of the original with Paul Rodgers providing the dynamic tension."

=== Charts ===
==== Weekly charts ====
Chart (1976)	Peak position
Canada Top Singles (RPM)	9
US Billboard Hot 100	20
US Cash Box Top 100	22

==== Year-end charts ====
Chart (1976)	Rank
Canada (RPM)	102
US (Joel Whitburn's Pop Annual)	136

== Other cover versions ==
"Young Blood" has been covered by several other artists, including a live performance by Leon Russell at the 1971 Concert for Bangla Desh, who was accompanied by a stageful of world-class musicians including George Harrison, Eric Clapton and Ringo Starr; another performance was included in Russell's three disk set Leon Live; a 1983 version by Beach Boys guitarist Carl Wilson that served as the title track to Youngblood (his second solo album); and a version by Bruce Willis in The Return of Bruno (1987). The Grateful Dead are known to have soundchecked the song. "Young Blood" was performed by Flash Cadillac and the Continental Kids (as "Johnny Fish and the Fins") in a Season Two episode of Happy Days. The song appeared on Jerry Lee Lewis's 1995 album of the same name. For the 1995 Doc Pomus tribute album Till The Night Is Gone - A Tribute To Doc Pomus released by Rhino Records, The Band also recorded a cover, which later appeared on the re-release of their 1996 album High on the Hog.

The song was sung by season 10 American Idol contestant Scotty McCreery during the Leiber & Stoller week of the competition.
