= Beach Boys' Party! Uncovered and Unplugged =

Compilation album and remix album by The Beach Boys
- Released: November 20, 2015
- Recorded: August 23–September 26, 1965
- Studio: United Western Recorders
- Genre: Folk rock, rock and roll
- Length: 147:00
- Label: Capitol
- Producer: Mark Linett; Brian Wilson (original recordings)

The Beach Boys chronology
Live in Sacramento 1964 (2014)	Beach Boys' Party! Uncovered and Unplugged (2015)	Live in Chicago 1965 (2015)

Beach Boys' Party! Uncovered and Unplugged is a compilation and remix album released by Capitol Records on November 20, 2015. It is an 81-track expansion of Beach Boys' Party!, presenting it without informal chatter overdubs followed by a selection of outtakes collected from the album's original five recording sessions.

== Background ==
Cover versions which did not feature on the original album include renditions of "One Kiss Led to Another", "You've Lost That Lovin' Feelin'", "Hang On Sloopy", "Twist and Shout", "The Diary", "Laugh at Me", "Ticket to Ride", "Blowin' in the Wind", "Riot in Cell Block Number 9", "Satisfaction", "Smokey Joe's Cafe", "Long Tall Sally", and "Heart and Soul". "Ruby Baby" was also not included on the original album but was released on the 1993 box set Good Vibrations: Thirty Years of The Beach Boys.

== Reception ==
Professional ratings
Review scores
Source	Rating
PopMatters	8/10 stars

PopMatters stated: "Most of these [tracks] would only be of interest to the Beach Boys’ special fans, but the new cleaned-up versions of the dozen original cuts are worthy of everyone's attention. ... [they] may not be a revelation to long time Beach Boys fans who always sensed the quality of the recordings, but it is a lot more pleasurable than the padded party noises ever conveyed."

== Track listing ==
=== Disc one ===
The Album
No.	Title	Writer(s)	Lead vocal(s)	Length
1.	"Hully Gully"	Fred Smith, Cliff Goldsmith	Mike Love	2:22
2.	"I Should Have Known Better"	Lennon–McCartney	Carl Wilson, Al Jardine	1:40
3.	"Tell Me Why"	Lennon–McCartney	C. Wilson, Jardine	1:47
4.	"Papa-Oom-Mow-Mow"	Carl White, Al Frazier, Sonny Harris, Turner Wilson Jr.	Brian Wilson	2:18
5.	"Mountain of Love"	Harold Dorman	Love	2:51
6.	"You've Got to Hide Your Love Away"	Lennon–McCartney	Dennis Wilson	2:25
7.	"Devoted to You"	Boudleaux Bryant	B. Wilson, Love	2:20
8.	"Alley Oop"	Dallas Frazier	Love	2:55
9.	"There's No Other (Like My Baby)"	Phil Spector, Leroy Bates	B. Wilson	2:57
10.	"I Get Around" / "Little Deuce Coupe"	Brian Wilson, Mike Love, Roger Christian	Love	3:20
11.	"The Times They Are a-Changin'"	Bob Dylan	Jardine	2:25
12.	"Barbara Ann"	Fred Fassert	B. Wilson, Dean Torrence	3:26

Session #1 – 8/23/65
No.	Title	Writer(s)	Lead vocal(s)	Length
13.	"Let's Get This Party Rolling"			1:58
14.	"I Should Have Known Better" (Take 1)	Lennon–McCartney	C. Wilson, Jardine	1:43
15.	"Ruby Baby" (Take 1)	Jerry Leiber, Mike Stoller	B. Wilson	2:14
16.	"(I Can't Get No) Satisfaction" (Take 1)	Mick Jagger, Keith Richards	B. Wilson, C. Wilson, D. Wilson, Jardine, Love	2:15
17.	"Hully Gully" (Take 1)	Smith, Goldsmith	Love	2:08
18.	"Blowin' in the Wind"	Dylan	Jardine	3:04
19.	"Dialog: 'The Sunrays'"			1:29

Session #2 – 9/8/65
No.	Title	Writer(s)	Length
20.	"Ruby Baby #2"	Leiber, Stoller	2:16
21.	"Dialog: 'The Masked Phantom'"		1:10
22.	"Hully Gully #2"	Smith, Goldsmith	3:25
23.	"Dialog: 'Carl, Go Get Your Bass'"		2:00
24.	"Hully Gully #3"	Smith, Goldsmith	2:11
25.	"(I Can't Get No) Satisfaction #2"	Jagger, Richards	2:03
26.	"Dialog: 'That's A Bad Guitar'"		0:28
27.	"Ruby Baby #3"	Leiber, Stoller	2:04
28.	"Dialog: 'What's The Matter Carl?'"		0:23
29.	"Ruby Baby #4"	Leiber, Stoller	2:44
30.	"Dialog: 'Carl's Tires'"		0:23
31.	"I Should Have Known Better #2"	Lennon–McCartney	0:46
32.	"I Should Have Known Better #3"	Lennon–McCartney	1:29
33.	"Dialog: 'Wasn't That Great Folks?'"		0:25
34.	"Tell Me Why #1"	Lennon–McCartney	0:59
35.	"Don't Worry Baby"	B. Wilson, Christian	0:44
36.	"You've Got To Hide Your Love Away #1"	Lennon–McCartney	2:20
37.	"Little Deuce Coupe #1"	B. Wilson, Love	1:55
38.	"California Girls"	B. Wilson, Love	2:56

=== Disc two ===
Session #2 – 9/8/65 (Continued)
No.	Title	Length
1.	"She Belongs To Me / The Artist (Laugh At Me) #1"
2.	"Fooling Around: Hang On Sloopy / You've Lost That Lovin' Feelin' / Twist And Shout"
3.	"Riot In Cell Block No.9 #1"
4.	"Fooling Around: The Diary"
5.	"Dialog: 'I Think We Better Do This Next Week'"

Session #3 – 9/14/65
No.	Title	Length
6.	"Dialog: 'Let's Cook Now And Eat Later'"
7.	"Tell Me Why #2"
8.	"I Should Have Known Better #4"
9.	"Dialog: 'What I Want To Do'"
10.	"Dialog: 'Are We Still In The Party?'"
11.	"Mountain Of Love #1"
12.	"Dialog: 'Where s Denny?'"
13.	"Devoted To You #1"
14.	"Dialog: 'What Are You Doing Now'"
15.	"You've Got To Hide Your Love Away #2"
16.	"Dialog: 'This Phony Party' / Ticket To Ride"
17.	"Alley Oop #1"
18.	"Alley Oop #2"
19.	"Dialog: 'Tune It Like This'"
20.	"There's No Other (Like My Baby) #1"
21.	"There's No Other (Like My Baby) #2"
22.	"Dialog: 'Do The Splits'"
23.	"Devoted To You #2"
24.	"Devoted To You #3"

Session #4 – 9/15/65
No.	Title	Length
25.	"You've Got To Hide Your Love Away #3"
26.	"I Get Around"
27.	"Little Deuce Coupe #2"
28.	"Mountain Of Love #2"
29.	"Ticket To Ride #2"
30.	"Riot In Cell Block No.9 #2"
31.	"The Artist (Laugh At Me) #2"
32.	"One Kiss Led to Another"

Session #5 – 9/26/65
No.	Title	Length
33.	"You've Got To Hide Your Love Away #4"
34.	"You've Got To Hide Your Love Away #5"
35.	"Dialog: 'What Did You Stop Us For Chuck?'"
36.	"The Times They Are A-Changin'"
37.	"Fooling Around: Heart And Soul / Long Tall Sally"
38.	"Fooling Around: The Boy from New York City"
39.	"Smokey Joe's Café"
40.	"Dialog: 'I Got One More'"
41.	"Barbara Ann #1"
42.	"Barbara Ann #2"
43.	"Barbara Ann #3"

== Personnel ==
Credits from band archivist Craig Slowinski.

The Beach Boys

- Al Jardine – vocals, 6 and 12 string guitars, ashtray
- Bruce Johnston – vocals, electric bass
- Mike Love – vocals
- Brian Wilson – vocals, bass, piano, bongos
- Carl Wilson – vocals, 6 and 12 string guitars, bass
- Dennis Wilson – vocals, bongos, castanet, harmonica

Additional musicians

- Hal Blaine – bongos
- Ray Avery – bongos
- Steve Korthof – bongos, tambourine
- Ron Swallow – tambourine
- Terry Melcher – tambourine
- Marilyn Wilson – vocals
- Billy Hinsche – harmonica on "Mountain of Love"
- Dean Torrence – co-lead vocal on "Barbara Ann"
