= Leon Hughes =

American musician (1930–2023)

- Born: May 6, 1930; Dallas, Texas, U.S.
- Died: March 1, 2023 (aged 92); Los Angeles, California, U.S.
- Occupation: Singer
- Known for: The Coasters

Leon Hughes Sr. (May 6, 1930 – March 1, 2023) was an American rhythm and blues singer. He was the last surviving original member of The Coasters.

== Biography ==
Leon Hughes was an original member of The Coasters (Bobby Nunn, Carl Gardner, and Billy Guy). He recorded with the original group line-up until 1958. His tenor voice is heard on many of the group's hits, including "Down in Mexico", "Searchin", and "Young Blood". The group's national debut happened in 1957, when the group appeared on NBC-TV's The Tonight Show. Both of these hits were National Top 10 Hits and the Top R&B Hits of 1957. He also appeared on Dick Clark's popular new national show American Bandstand. He had been working at a car wash when Bobby Nunn had recommended him as second tenor for The Coasters. He was replaced after 1957 by Cornell Gunter. Leon's career with the Original Coasters can be seen on the group's timeline at the Rock and Roll Hall of Fame Museum.

Leon's career has given him opportunities to travel the world & to appear at many prominent venues. Some of them include the Famous Apollo Theatre, The Historic Howard Theatre, The Kennedy Center, Carnegie Hall, Madison Square Garden, Radio City Music Hall and Disneyland. He has appeared with legendary artists of the Rock and Roll Era. Some of these artists include: Chuck Berry, Little Richard, The Platters, The Drifters, Bill Haley and the Comets, The Shirelles and many more.

The Coasters legendary recordings continue to entertain millions worldwide. Many of their songs are featured in the popular award-winning music revue Smokey Joe's Cafe. Their hits are also featured in major motion pictures such as Home Alone and recently in the soundtrack of Quentin Tarantino's Death Proof.

With Carl Gardner's death on June 12, 2011, Leon Hughes was the last surviving member of the original Coasters.

Leon has received numerous accolades for his 67 years in entertainment. He received the Rhythm and Blues Pioneer Award in 1994.

In 2014, Leon Hughes was honored and inducted into the Doo Wop Music Hall Of Fame in Hollywood California. Leon was given a Recognition of his over 60 years in entertainment by The Mayor of Los Angeles, Eric Garcetti. In addition, he was also given a Certificate of Recognition for his outstanding contributions in entertainment from the U. S. Congress. This honor was presented to him by U.S. Congress Representative Maxine Waters (D, CA.) at the Doo Wop Music Hall Of Fame event on April 6, 2014.

Hughes died at his home in Watts, Los Angeles, on March 1, 2023, at the age of 92.

== Other music groups ==
Leon was an original member of the Lamplighters during 1952–53 (together with Mathew Nelson and Willie Ray Rockwell). Hughes left the Lamplighters before they recorded with new lead Al Frazier. Before joining The Coasters, Leon had been a member of doo wop groups The Hollywood Flames. In 1956, he recorded with The Celebritys which included his brother Elder O'Neal. That same year, he also recorded on his own label Leoneal Records with The Signals which included his sister Shirley Hughes and brothers Elder O'Neal and Bernard McCants. Leon also recorded a single as "Leoneal and Janet" (backup vocals by The Signals).

After leaving The Coasters, he teamed with Bobby Nunn to record as The Dukes in 1959 for Flip Records. "Looking For You" b/w "Groceries, Sir" (Flip #343), and "I Love You" b/w "Leap Year Cha Cha" (Flip #344) were the singles released.

In the 1970s, he recorded with several Coasters groups. In 1975, he recorded with "The Coasters Two Plus Two" for Chelan Records. The record "Searchin' 75" b/w "Young Blood" stated that these recordings were from the album called "Reunion." In 1976, he recorded an album with "The World Famous Coasters" which included Will "Dub" Jones. This album was released on American International Records (In Europe on DJM). In 1998, a CD called "Leon Hughes: One Of The First Original Coasters" was released on Oldie CD, and a VHS tape called "The Coasters: Tribute To Their Greatest Hits" was released. Hughes still performed with a Coasters group, sometimes as "Leon Hughes and his Original Coasters." He also has done some performances with a Hollywood Flames group.

== Discography ==
=== Various group singles and recordings ===
- This Is My Plea/Juanita (Caroline #2301) (1956) (The Celebritys)
- We Made Romance/Absent Minded (Caroline #2302) (1956) (The Celebritys)
- Juanita/Show Me The Way (Leoneal #1483) (1956) (The Signals)
- No One/What Is This Thing (Leoneal #02) (1956) (Leoneal & Janet)
- Leap Year Cha Cha (Leoneal) (unreleased) (1956) (The Signals)
- Down In Mexico/Turtle Dovin (Atco #6064) (1956) (The Coasters)
- One Kiss Led to Another/Brazil (Atco #6073) (1956) (The Coasters)
- Searchin/Young Blood (Atco #6087) (1957) (The Coasters)
- Looking For You/Groceries, Sir (Flip #343) (1959) (The Dukes)
- I Love You/Leap Year Cha Cha (Flip #344) (1959) (The Dukes)
- Searchin ’75/Young Blood (Chelan #2000) (1975) (The Coasters Two Plus Two)
- If I Had A Hammer/If I Had A Hammer (Disco Version) (AI #1122) (1976) ("World Famous" Coasters – also issued as The Coasters)
- So Fine / Baby What You Want Me To Do (AceHi #M-101) (ca 1977) (The World Famous Coasters)
- My Best Friend (2012) (Leon Hughes)
