= One Kiss Led to Another =

Single by The Coasters

from the album The Coasters
- B-side: "Brazil"
- Released: July 28, 1956
- Genre: R&B
- Length: 2:35
- Label: Atco
- Songwriter(s): Jerry Leiber, Mike Stoller
- Producer(s): Jerry Leiber, Mike Stoller

The Coasters singles chronology
"Down in Mexico" (1956)	"One Kiss Led to Another" (1956)	"Searchin'" (1957)

"One Kiss Led to Another" is a song written by Jerry Leiber and Mike Stoller and performed by The Coasters. The song reached #11 on the R&B chart and #73 on the Billboard Hot 100 in 1956. The song appeared on their 1957 album, The Coasters.

The song was produced by Jerry Leiber and Mike Stoller.

== Personnel ==
- Mike Stoller, piano
- Gil Bernal, saxophone
- Barney Kessell, guitar
- probably Adolph Jacobs, guitar
- Ralph Hamilton, bass
- Jesse Sailes, drums
- Chico Guerrero, congas

== Covers ==
The Beach Boys recorded the song in September 1965 as an outtake for their album Beach Boys' Party!, with lead vocals by Mike Love.

The New York City group Hackamore Brick appropriated a (modified) version of this song's title for the title of their lone album on the Kama Sutra label, One Kiss Leads to Another, released in 1970. The phrase also appears in the lyrics to the album's second track, "Oh! Those Sweet Bananas".
