= Grady Chapman =

American singer (1929–2011)

Grady Chapman (October 1, 1929 – January 4, 2011) was best known as the American lead singer of doo wop group The Robins.

== Biography ==
Born in Greenville, South Carolina, Chapman joined The Robins in 1952, singing alongside Bobby Nunn, Billy Richards, Roy Richards, Ty Terrell, and later Carl Gardner. During that time, the Robins recorded for RCA, and later Jerry Leiber and Mike Stoller's Los Angeles–based "Spark" label. In 1955, when Leiber and Stoller took Robins members Nunn and Gardner east to form the Coasters, the Robins recruited H. B. Barnum, and continued recording for the Whippet label. In 1958, he wrote "Sweet Pea" (Class Records #232) for Bob and Earl. Chapman would later become a member of one of the Coasters' many spin-off groups, The Coasters Mark II, which included Bobby Nunn, Bobby Sheen, and Billy Richards, Jr. In 1977, along with Billy Guy and Jerome Evans, he sang on "Paid The Price" on Michelle Phillips' album Victim Of Romance. Chapman would also substitute for Carl Gardner a few times in the 1990s and 2000s with The Coasters. He still performed as Grady Chapman & The Robins with various back-up musicians, until his death, from congestive heart failure, on January 4, 2011.

== Discography ==
=== Singles ===
- I Need You So/Don't Blooper (Money #204) (1955) (as Grady Chapman And The Suedes)
- My Love Will Never Change/Smiling Gondolier (Zephyr #016) (1957)
- Say You Will Be Mine/Starlight, Starbright (Knight #2003) (1958)
- Garden Of Memories/Tell Me That You Care (Imperial #5591) (1959)
- Come Away/Let's Talk About Us (Imperial #5611) (1959)
- Sweet Thing/I Know What I Want (Mercury #71632) (1960)
- Ambush/My Life Would Be Worth Living (Mercury #71698) (1960)
- I'll Never Question Your Love/This, That, ‘N The Other (Mercury #71771) (1961)

=== Albums ===
- The Robins: Rock ‘N’ Roll With The Robins (Whippet #WLP-703) (1957)
- Let's Talk About Us (Hydra #BCK-27145) (2012)

== Other media ==
- In 2006, he appeared on the TV show Joey in the episode entitled "Joey And The Party For Alex" playing Pip #1
- His recording "Since I First Met You" from 1957 with The Robins is included in the films Pulp Fiction and American Strays.
- "Out Of The Picture" from 1956 by The Robins (with Chapman) appears in a Hewlett-Packard printer commercial.
