= Kent Harris =

American songwriter and record producer (1930–2019)

- Born: October 15, 1930; Oklahoma City, Oklahoma, U.S.
- Origin: San Diego, California
- Died: April 9, 2019 (aged 88)
- Occupations: Record producer, songwriter

Kent Levaughn Harris (October 15, 1930 – April 9, 2019) was an American songwriter and record producer, who is best known as the writer of novelty tunes such as "Shoppin' for Clothes" (a hit for The Coasters, featured on Broadway’s Musical Smokey Joe’s Cafe) credited to Harris, Leiber and Stoller), and "Cops and Robbers" (a hit for Bo Diddley, The Rolling Stones, George Thorogood, and Wayne Fontana) . He recorded under various pseudonyms including Ducky Drake and Boogaloo and his Gallant Crew.

== Biography ==
Kent Harris was born in Oklahoma City, Oklahoma and was raised in San Diego, California. He first recorded in 1954 as Ducky Drake for Trend Records, singing the B-side of his sister Dimples Harris' record "Hey Mr. Jelly." The B-side was called "1992." He would then change his stage name to Boogaloo. Harris originally recorded the song later known as "Shoppin' For Clothes" for Crest Records, as "Clothes Line (Wrap It Up)." It was released in 1956 as by Boogaloo and His Gallant Crew. Following the relative failure of his two Crest singles, Harris abandoned his recording ambitions in favor of a career behind the scenes. He is listed with 97 songs in the BMI songwriters' database. Harris saw a number of his songs recorded by artists on Atlantic, Capitol, RCA and Columbia. The Coasters' hit version, produced by and co-credited to Leiber and Stoller, was released in 1960. The B-side of this record, "Cops And Robbers," later became a hit for Bo Diddley in 1957. His previous release for the label in 1955 was "Big Fat Lie" b/w "Talk About A Party."

His sisters Marcene, Beverly, and Betty Harris recorded together as The Harris Sisters. Marcene "Dimples" Harris (April 18, 1933 – July 22, 1976) also had a single released in 1956 on Crest Records called "This I Do Believe" b/w "If You'll Be True" (Crest #1030) under the name Dimples Harris. Dimples also recorded for Savoy Records in 1951 as the Dimples Harris Trio. In 1960, Harris formed his own label, Romark Records, and eventually went into record retailing, running the Target record store in L.A. One record "Che Bongo Blues" b/w "Call Me Daddy" was released on Regent #1045. Two other recordings "I Do Believe" and "Good Timing Papa" were not released. Dimples also released some records as Marcene Harris such as "A Song To You" b/w "I Know How It Feels" (Romark #118), "Work It Out" b/w "Children Of Georgia" (Romark), "Hang On To What You Got" (Octave #8270), and "I Just Don't Understand" b/w "Guess Who" (Valiant #727, released in 1965). Dimples married Harold "Hack" Jackson. Betty was married to comedian Redd Foxx. Beverly also filled in for Zola Taylor singing with The Platters. Dimples died in 1976.

Harris produced records for several artists in the 1960s and 1970s. He produced "Stick Shift" b/w "Cruising" by The Duals in 1961 and "So Far Away" b/w "Monkey Hips And Rice" by Hank Jacobs in 1963, both records were released on Sue Records. He also produced records for Adolph Jacobs, Jimmy Ellis, and The Mighty Hannibal on his own label, Romark Records. He produced some jazz recordings for Adolph Jacobs in the 1970s. Jacobs was a former member of The Coasters in the 1950s. Harris co-produced a record with Obie Jessie (better known as Young Jessie) in 1972 on Stone Dogg Records called "Who's The Blame" b/w "Beautiful Day My Brother" by Obie Jessie and The Seeds Of Freedom.

Other songs written by Harris include "Fat Sally" by The Sevilles (from 1961), "Lover Supreme" by Prentice Moreland, "I'll Come Back To You" by Dorothy Berry, "Tell Her For Me" by Jimmy Norman, "Oh! My Aching Back" by H. B. Barnum (all from 1962), and "The Big Rip Off" by The Coasters (from 1976).

Harris managed soul singer Ty Karim (born Veatrice Thomas, 1947–1983) and produced many of her records. Ty Karim died in 1983 from breast cancer. Their daughter Karime Harris is also a singer with the funk group the Killer Meters. UK's Kent Records (a subsidiary of Ace Records) released Ty Karim's complete known recordings entitled The Complete Ty Karim: Los Angeles' Soul Goddess in 2008.

== Discography ==
=== Singles ===
- "Hey Mr. Jelly" / "1992" (Trend #2500) (1954) (Side A is by Dimples Harris) (Side B is by Harris as Ducky Drake)
- "Saint Of Sinner" / "Long Lean Lanky Juke Box" (Trend #2501) (Side A is by Harris as Ducky Drake - matrix #45-T-141-5) (Side B is by Dimples Harris - matrix #45-T-142-6)
- "Big Fat Lie" / "Talk About A Party" (Crest #1014) (1955) (as Boogaloo and His Gallant Crew)
- "Clothes Line (Wrap It Up)" / "Cops And Robbers" (Crest #1030) (1956) (as Boogaloo and His Gallant Crew)

=== Various artists compilations ===
- Talk About A Party: Crest Records Story (Rockstar) (2004)
- The Best Of Crest Records (Crest #1000)
- Timeless Discoveries Kent Harris Presents: Reaching Back (2010)
- Kent Harris' R&B Family (2012)
- Romark Records - Kent Harris' Soul Sides (2013)
- Catch Action: The Sophisticated Boogie Funk of Sheridan House Records (2014)
