= Shoppin' for Clothes =

Single by the Coasters
- B-side: "The Snake and the Book Worm"
- Released: September 1960
- Recorded: July 29, 1960
- Studio: Atlantic, New York City
- Genre: Novelty R&B
- Length: 2:57
- Label: Atco
- Songwriters: Elmo Glick a.k.a. Leiber and Stoller (original); Kent Harris (credited on later issues)
- Producers: Jerry Leiber; Mike Stoller

The Coasters singles chronology
"Wake Me, Shake Me" (1960)	"Shoppin' for Clothes" (1960)	"Wait a Minute" (1961)

"Shoppin' for Clothes" is a novelty R&B song in the talking blues style, recorded by American vocal group the Coasters in 1960. Originally credited to Elmo Glick, a songwriting pseudonym of Jerry Leiber and Mike Stoller, who also produced the track, it was partly based on the 1956 song "Clothes Line (Wrap It Up)", written by Kent Harris and recorded by him as Boogaloo and his Gallant Crew. Harris later received a co-writing credit on "Shoppin' for Clothes."

== Background and recording ==
Jerry Leiber conceived the idea for the recording when Billy Guy of the Coasters told him about a song he had heard on the radio, about a man shopping for clothes. Guy had remembered some of the lyrics, but not the song title or singer. Leiber failed to track down the original recording, and created some new lyrics on the same theme, incorporating the lines that Guy had remembered.

Both songs had the same introductory lines:

I was shoppin’ for a suit the other day
And walked into the department store
Stepped on the elevator and told the girl, "Dry goods floor"
When I got off, a salesman come up to me
He said, "Now, what can I do for you"
I said, "Well, go in there and show me all them sport clothes
Like you s’pposed to"

The song continues with the singer being shown various expensive, stylish suits while demonstrating his deep knowledge of men's fashions of 1960, eventually selecting several and then telling the merchant to "go get that paper so I can sign on the dotted line", but subsequently being told, "I’m sorry my man, but your credit didn’t go through”, and taunting him with "That’s a suit you’ll never own." The hapless shopper laments "It's a shame and me with a good job, sweeping up every day!".

Stoller wrote and arranged the music, at a slower tempo than Harris' earlier song, and the group recorded the track on July 29, 1960, at Atlantic Studios in New York City. In reciting the dialogue, Guy took the part of the shopper and bass singer Will "Dub" Jones was the salesman. Other musicians were group members Carl Gardner and Cornell Gunter, with Stoller (piano), King Curtis (tenor sax), Sonny Forriest and Phil Spector (guitars), Wendell Marshall (bass), and Gary Chester (drums).

Writer Matt Powell said that "Guy’s ... vocal performance as the hapless customer is a subtle, nuanced, self-deprecating hipster tour de force", and "King Curtis’ sly, playful, warm and flirty sax lines accentuate Stoller's minimalist, stuttering groove bed". Phil Hardy called the track "the coolest—and blackest—sounding of [the Coasters'] Atlantic recordings."

== Release and legacy ==
Released by Atco Records in September 1960, the record reached no higher than number 83 on the Billboard Hot 100. After Harris' publishing company, American Music, alleged copyright infringement, an out-of-court settlement gave Harris sole writing credit. Some later copies of the record were titled "Clothes Line (Wrap It Up)" (Harris' original title), with a writing credit given to Harris. Adding to the confusion, some 1961 copies with the "Clothes Line" title are mispressed, and actually play the song "Silver Dollar", performed by Barry Darvell.

In live performances, the Coasters would place a clothes rack on stage, and dramatize the song.
