= Jimmy Norman =

American R&B singer-songwriter (1937–2011)

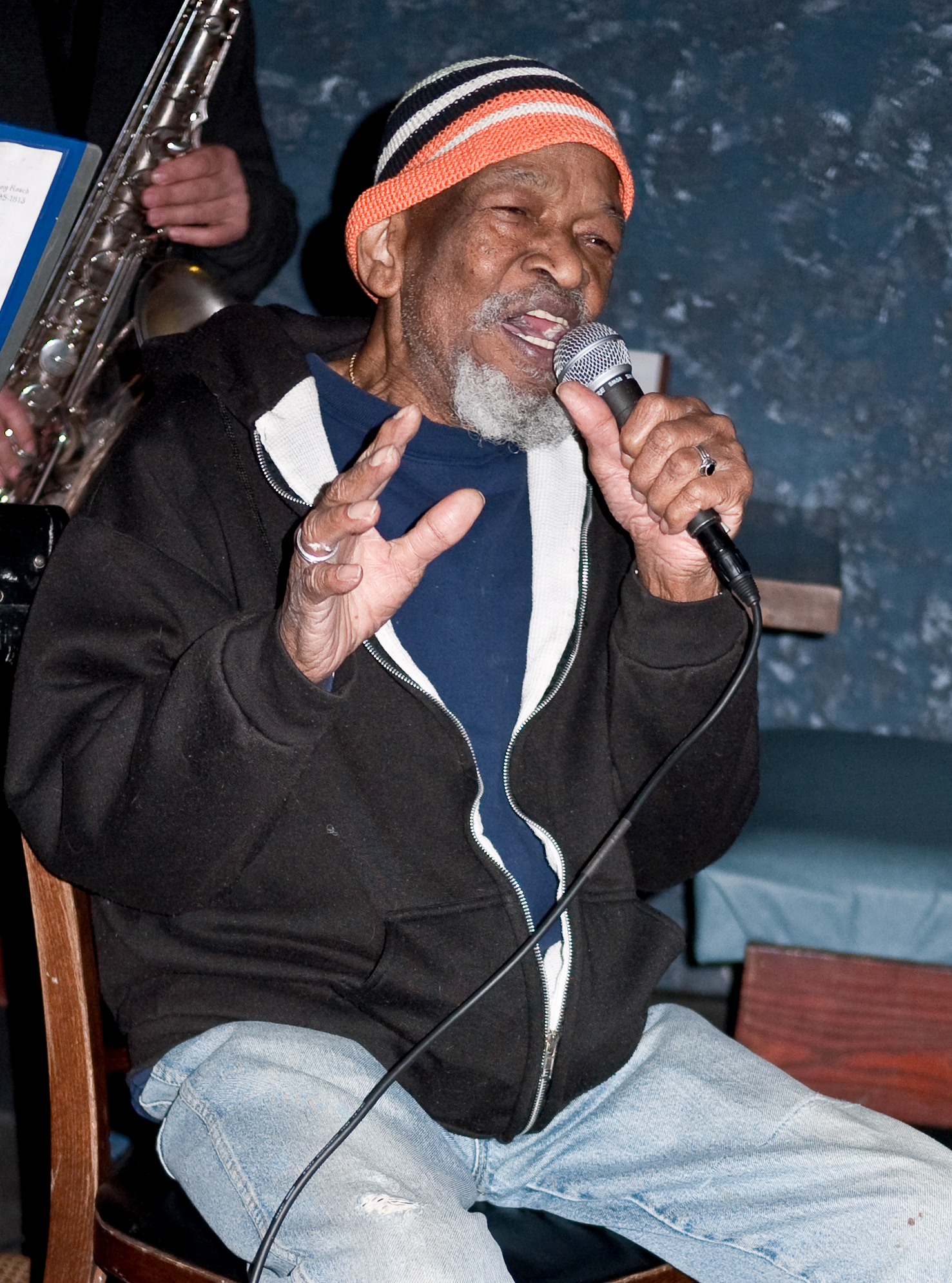
- Norman performing at the P&G Bar with Jonny Rosch's band on December 1, 2009

Background information
- Born: James Norman Scott; August 12, 1937; Nashville, Tennessee, U.S.
- Died: November 8, 2011 (aged 74) New York City, New York, U.S.
- Genres: R&B, jazz
- Occupations: Singer, songwriter
- Instrument: Vocals
- Years active: 1950s–2011
- Label: Wildflower

James Norman Scott (August 12, 1937 – November 8, 2011) was an American R&B and jazz singer and songwriter. In his early career, Norman had a charting single of his own, "I Don't Love You No More (I Don't Care About You)", as well as performing session work with Jimi Hendrix, but he is better known as a lyricist and songwriter. He wrote the expanded lyrics of the song "Time Is on My Side", which became a hit for The Rolling Stones and was later re-recorded and produced by Stephen Vanderbilt featuring "St. Tropez" as the A side of a 45 released from the album Home throughout Europe. Norman composed a number of songs performed by well-known musicians including Johnny Nash and Bob Marley. In 1969 he became involved with doo-wop band The Coasters, first as a producer and then as a touring member. He was also recording independently, releasing a solo album in 1998, the same year poor health forced him to retire from performance. Like many other musicians of his time, he was not financially prepared for retirement or heavy medical bills, and with few royalties for his writing soon found himself in economic crisis. With the assistance of charitable organization Jazz Foundation of America, Norman regained his feet and resumed performing, releasing his first wide-distribution album in 2004, Little Pieces. He performed in the Manhattan area until shortly before his death.

== Early life and career ==
James Norman Scott was born on August 12, 1937, in Nashville, Tennessee. He relocated to California as a teenager, beginning his career as a touring musician throughout the Midwest and southern regions of the United States before settling in New York City. There, he wrote music for Broadway and performed. In 1962, Norman released his biggest charting single, "I Don't Love You No More (I Don't Care About You)", which reached #21 on the Billboard "Black Singles" chart and #47 on the "Pop Singles" chart.

== Songwriting and session work ==
In 1964, singer Irma Thomas went into the studio to record the single "Anyone Who Knows What Love Is (Will Understand)". It was decided that the b-side, a cover of Kai Winding's "Time Is on My Side", needed additional lyrics, since the only words in the original composition were "Time is on my side" and "You'll come runnin' back." Norman was contacted and composed the rest of the lyrics to the tune. The Rolling Stones also recorded the song with Norman's lyrics and released it as a single, which became the band's first hit to break the top ten. The Rolling Stones' releases did credit Norman as lyric writer for a number of years, but eventually his name was removed; in the early 1990s, he was told by the publisher that the credit was not legally binding, as it had been a "clerical error".

In 1966, Norman recorded several tracks with Jimi Hendrix on session at Abtone Studio in New York: "You're Only Hurting Yourself", "Little Groovemaker" and "On You Girlie It Looks so Good". The second of these songs was retooled under the title "Groove Maker" and has been included on a number of Hendrix releases. According to Black Gold: The Lost Archives of Jimi Hendrix, Norman—not Lonnie Youngblood as popularly supposed—was the primary performer besides Hendrix on this song. Jimi Hendrix – From the Benjamin Franklin Studios 3rd Edition Part 1: The Complete Guide to the Recorded Work of Jimi Hendrix posits Youngblood on saxophone, but gives writing credit to Norman. Jimi Hendrix: Musician documents the confusion surrounding this and other Hendrix sessions of the time, including the difficulty in tracking contributions when they also rose from later manipulation of the material as Hendrix became famous. "You're Only Hurting Yourself" and "Little Groovemaker" were first released under Norman's name as Samar records single 112 in 1966 and never again released in original form. "On You Girlie It Looks so Good" remains unreleased.

In 1968, Norman was visited by a young Bob Marley in his Bronx apartment. Norman had at that time written a number of songs for Johnny Nash, whose record label had just signed Marley, and Marley wanted to learn more about rhythm and blues. Along with Al Pyfrom, Norman's co-writer, and Marley's wife Rita, the pair spent several days in a jam session that ultimately resulted in a 24-minute tape of Marley performing several of his own and Norman-Pyfrom's compositions. According to Reggae archivist Roger Steffens, the tape—which was lost among Norman's possessions for decades—is rare for Marley in that it was influenced by pop music rather than reggae, highlighting a point in Marley's career when he was still trying to find his path. Some of the songs from this early jam session were released on the Marley album Chances Are.

Following these sessions, Norman went to Kingston, Jamaica and spent more than half a year there, working in the studio with Marley and composing songs. A number of his compositions were recorded by Marley, Peter Tosh, Byron Lee and the Dragonaires, and Neville Willoughby. Some of the tapes recorded by Norman during his sessions with Marley have been commercially released as part of the Marley compilation album, Soul Almighty.

== Coasters years ==
After producing a single for the doo-wop band The Coasters in 1969 for Lloyd Price's Turntable Records, Norman replaced Vernon Harrell as the regular substitute (permanently, later on) for Billy Guy in the group in the 1970s, touring with them until forced to retire by ill-health in 1998, the same year his album Tobacco Road was released by independent label Bad Cat Records. In interview, Norman cited the limited repertoire, noting that fans of the band were only interested in hearing hits like "Yakety Yak", "Charlie Brown" and "Poison Ivy"; "In 30 years we did maybe 10 songs." Norman did have opportunity to deviate with other love songs from the 1950s, the era when The Coasters rose to fame.

During his time with the Coasters, Norman teamed up with Eddie Palmieri as lead vocalist in the group Harlem River Drive, which released a self-titled album in 1971.

== Health and economic crisis ==
Norman suffered multiple heart attacks and respiratory disease which restricted him, impoverished, to his home in Manhattan. Though he had a successful career that allowed him at one point to own several clubs, he did not plan for retirement and, like many composers of his time, received little to no royalties for his compositions. In 2002, he told The Jamaica Observer with respect to the songs he wrote that were released by Marley, "Periodically, I get chump change, nothing big. A lotta people have been making money off of it, not me." Norman attempted to get local work without success and, lacking health insurance and investment funds, was near the point of eviction when he came to the attention of the Jazz Foundation of America, which helps redress what The Crisis characterizes as the exploitation of "less savvy or uneducated performers" by record labels and other more powerful members of the music community.

== Recovery and death ==
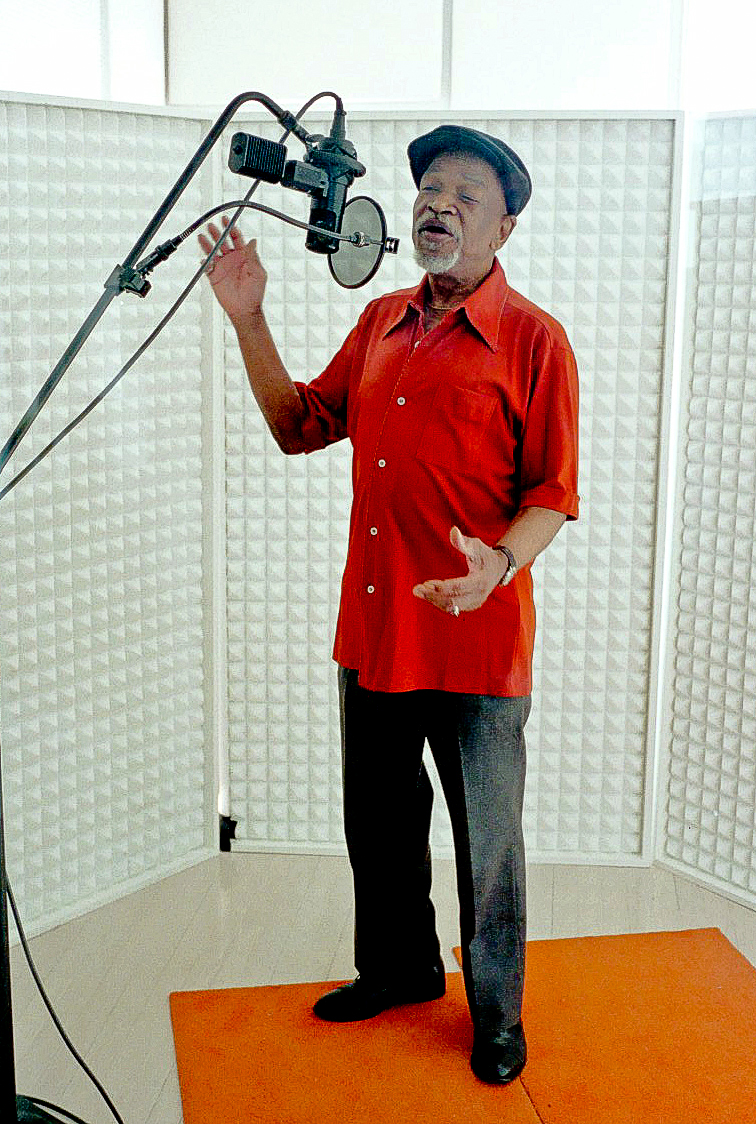
Norman recording in the studio, 2004

Wendy Oxenhorn, director of the Foundation, arranged for housekeeping and free medical care for Norman, as well as helping him plan for his future, providing back rent and negotiating with Norman's landlord. In the course of that housekeeping, in July 2002, Norman's rare tape of his jam session with Marley was located in his apartment and placed on auction, retrieving considerably above its estimated value when auctioned at $26,290. During the same housekeeping session, Norman rediscovered old notebooks containing his compositions. Producer Kerryn Tolhurst recorded Norman performing the songs on a tape recorder in his apartment, taking the tapes into the studio later to add parts by other musicians. Judy Collins, whose drummer Tony Beard contributed to the project, released the resultant album under her own Wildflower label in 2004. The project, titled Little Pieces, is the first album Norman has ever released with wide distribution. In 2006, Little Pieces won in The 5th Annual Independent Music Awards for Best Blues Album.

In the 2000s, Norman has performed live. In 2003, he performed a benefit concert for the Jazz Foundation at the Gilsey House in New York. In 2007, he took part in the Jazz Foundation's annual "Great Night in Harlem", performing "Time Is on My Side". As of 2007, Norman was performing locally in Manhattan.

Norman died on November 8, 2011, in New York City after a long illness. He had held his last public performance on October 29, 2011, for the Jazz Foundation of America. Married three times, he was the father of two children.

== Discography ==
=== Chart singles ===
Year	Single	Chart Positions	
Year	Single	US Pop	US R&B
1962	"I Don't Love You No More (I Don't Care About You)"	47	21
1966	"Can You Blame Me"	-	35
