= Smokey Joe's Cafe (revue) =

Musical by Jerry Leiber and Mike Stoller

- The Songs of Leiber and Stoller
- Original Cast Recording
- Music: Jerry Leiber; Mike Stoller
- Lyrics: Jerry Leiber; Mike Stoller
- Productions: 1995 Broadway; 1996 West End; 2018 Off-Broadway

Smokey Joe's Cafe is a musical revue showcasing 39 pop standards, including rock and roll and rhythm and blues songs written by songwriters Jerry Leiber and Mike Stoller. The Original Broadway cast recording, Smokey Joe's Cafe: The Songs of Leiber and Stoller, won a Grammy Award in 1997.

After a Los Angeles tryout, the revue opened on Broadway in 1995, running for 2,036 performances, making it the longest-running musical revue in Broadway history. It also had a London run in 2021.

== Synopsis ==
In revue format with no unifying theme, the 39 songs are presented by various members of the cast in various combinations with no dialogue. There are novelty songs ("Charlie Brown"), romantic ballads ("Spanish Harlem"), and infectious melodies ("There Goes My Baby").

== Songs ==
Music and lyrics for all songs are by Jerry Leiber and Mike Stoller, unless otherwise noted. The song "Smokey Joe's Cafe" is not performed in the show, although a brief instrumental excerpt is used in Act II as transitional music.

Act I

- "Neighborhood" (music and lyrics by John Sembello, Ralph Dino, Jerry Leiber and Mike Stoller)
- "Young Blood" (music and lyrics by Doc Pomus, Jerry Leiber and Mike Stoller)
- "Falling"
- "Ruby Baby"
- "Dance With Me" (music and lyrics by Louis Lebish, George Treadwell, Irv Nahan, Jerry Leiber and Mike Stoller)
- "Neighborhood" (Reprise)
- "Keep On Rollin'"
- "Searchin'"
- "Kansas City"
- "Trouble"
- "Love Me" / "Don't"
- "Fools Fall In Love"
- "Poison Ivy"
- "Don Juan"
- "Shoppin' for Clothes" (music and lyrics by Kent Harris, Jerry Leiber and Mike Stoller)
- "I Keep Forgettin'"
- "On Broadway" (music and lyrics by Barry Mann, Cynthia Weil, Jerry Leiber and Mike Stoller)
- "D.W. Washburn"
- "Saved"

Act II

- "Baby That Is Rock & Roll"
- "Yakety Yak"
- "Charlie Brown"
- "Stay a While"
- "Pearl's a Singer" (music and lyrics by John Sembello, Ralph Dino, Jerry Leiber and Mike Stoller)
- "Teach Me How to Shimmy"
- "You're the Boss"
- "Loving You"
- "Treat Me Nice"
- "Hound Dog"
- "Little Egypt"
- "I'm a Woman"
- "There Goes My Baby" (music and lyrics by Benjamin Earl Nelson, Lover Patterson, George Treadwell, Jerry Leiber and Mike Stoller)
- "Love Potion #9"
- "Some Cats Know"
- "Jailhouse Rock"
- "Fools Fall In Love" (Reprise)
- "Spanish Harlem" (music and lyrics by Phil Spector and Jerry Leiber)
- "I (Who Have Nothing)" (music and lyrics by Carlo Donida, Mogol, Jerry Leiber and Mike Stoller)
- "Stand by Me" (music and lyrics by Ben E. King, Jerry Leiber and Mike Stoller)
- "Baby That Is Rock & Roll" (Reprise)

== Productions ==
=== Original 1995 production ===
Conceived by Stephen Helper, Jack Viertel and Otis Sallid, Smokey Joe's Cafe premiered at the Doolittle Theatre in Los Angeles, where it ran from November 1994 to January 22, 1995. The revue opened on Broadway on March 2, 1995, at the Virginia Theatre. Directed by Jerry Zaks with choreography by Joey McKneely and vocal arrangements by Chapman Roberts, the original nine-person cast featured Ken Ard, Adrian Bailey, Brenda Braxton, Victor Trent Cook, B. J. Crosby, Pattie D'Arcy Jones, DeLee Lively, Frederick B. Owens, and Michael Park, and later included Deb Lyons (replacement for Jones) and Matt Bogart (replacement for Park), both of whom performed in the final filmed DVD performance on January 18, 2000. Throughout its run, there were special appearances by popular singers including Ben E. King (December 1998), Pam Tillis (April 1999), Gladys Knight (May 1999), Tony Orlando (June 1999), Lou Rawls (April 1999), Gloria Gaynor (August 1999) and Rick Springfield (October 1999). Gladys Knight also appeared in the tour when it played Boston in February 2000, and Caesar's Palace Circus Maximus, Las Vegas in March–June 2000. A film crew captured the final Broadway performance and it appeared on DVD in 2001.

=== 1996 West End ===
It premiered in the West End at the Prince of Wales Theatre on October 1, 1996 and ran through October 1, 1998. Zaks and McKneely return to direct and choreograph respectively, with some of the Broadway cast (Cook, Lively, and Crosby) repeating their roles.

=== 2010 Paper Mill ===
The Paper Mill Playhouse staged a production of the musical which ran from April 7, 2010 through May 2, 2010. Tom Helm served as musical director and Mark S. Hobee staged the production. The cast included Jackie Burns, E. Clayton Cornelious, Bernard Dotson, Felicia Finley, Carly Hughes, Andrew Rannells, Dennis Stowe, Maia Nkenge Wilson, and Eric LaJuan Summers.

=== 2014 54 Sings ===
On February 9, 2014, original cast members Brenda Braxton, Adrian Bailey, DeLee Lively, Frederick Owens, Ken Ard, and Michael Park, Deb Lyons, Darryl Williams, and Ramona Keller reunited for a performance at New York's 54 Below as part of the "54 Sings Series" under direction of Braxton.

=== 2014 Arena Stage ===
The Arena Stage in Washington, DC produced the revue in 2014. The production was directed by Randy Johnson and choreographed by Parker Esse, opening on April 25, 2014 and running through June 8, 2014.

=== 2015 and 2016 Argentinian productions ===
The revue was also produced in Argentina by G&C Entertainment, directed by Alejandro Guevara, musically directed by Daniel Landea, vocally coached by Katie Viqueira and choreographed by Delfina García Escudero. It has its opening at Teatro La Comedia on September 7, 2015, and ran through November 19, 2015. The Argentinian cast includes Belén Cabrera (B.J.), Cristian Centurión (Adrian), Mariano Condoluci (Victor), Emmanuel Degracia (Ken), Daniela Flombaum (Pattie), Diego Jaraz (Michael), Patrissia Lorca (DeLee), Sofía Val (Brenda) and Sebastián Ziliotto (Fred).

In 2016, a production took place in a new season in Buenos Aires, Argentina, directed by Diego Jaraz, musical supervision by Federico Vilas, vocal coaching by Katie Viqueira, and choreographed by Delfina Garcia Escudero. It had its opening night at Sala Siranush on May 6, 2016, closing on June 24, 2016. This Argentinian cast included Belén Cabrera (B.J.), Cristian Centurión (Adrian), Mariano Condoluci (Victor), Emmanuel Degracia (Ken), Daniela Flombaum (Pattie), Patricio Wittis (Michael), Patrissia Lorca (DeLee), Sofía Val (Brenda) and Sebastián Ziliotto (Fred). This Argentinian production had 4 ACE Awards nominations, and 7 Hugo Awards nominations.

=== 2018 revival ===
In 2018 Smokey Joe's Cafe was revived by the original producers, Steven Baruch, Marc Routh, Richard Frankel, and Tom Viertel. The production ran at the Ogunquit Playhouse, Maine, between May 16 to June 9. The production then opened Off-Broadway at Stage 42 with previews from July 6, opening July 22. The show closed on November 4 the same year. Choreography and direction was done and made by Joshua Bergasse, scenic design by Beowulf Boritt, original vocal arrangements by Chapman Roberts, and orchestrations by Steve Margoshes and Sonny Paladino; however, Roberts has claimed that his original 1995 vocal arrangements were reused without his permission.

== Response ==
The theatre critic for the magazine Variety, in reviewing the Los Angeles tryout, noted that "the songwriters, director Jerry Zaks and choreographer Joey McKneely don't do enough packaging of the material, don't go far enough taking songs first heard on transistor radios and re-imagining them for the stage...There are a couple of halfhearted [sic] attempts at structure. The show opens and closes with the 1974 obscurity "Neighborhood," which suggests this will be a scrapbook of memories."

Ben Brantley, in his review for The New York Times wrote that the revue "is a strangely homogenized tribute to one of popular music's most protean songwriting teams...There has obviously been a decision not to go for literal period nostalgia, so the songs are freed from their distinctive original contexts...Too often, though, the performers are simply singing into space without any ostensible reason for being there."

The theatre critic for The Guardian (London), noted that the London cast consists of "acting singers rather than singing actors, which suits a show where there's almost no acting to be done. Whew - no pesky plot development or subtexts, just a glut of glowing pop tunes...There's no attempt at chronology, or even biography."

According to Peter Marks, reviewing in The Washington Post, the revue "never quite attained smash-hit status," but it made popular the musical fashioned on the existing work of "pop composers already beloved by baby boomers."

Bob Gaudio cited Smokey Joe's Cafe as the first show that inspired him to commission Jersey Boys, as it showed that a musical with repurposed pop songs could be a success.

== Awards and nominations ==
=== Original Broadway production ===
Year	Award	Category	Nominee	Result
1995	Tony Award	Best Musical		Nominated
1995	Tony Award	Best Performance by a Featured Actor in a Musical	Victor Trent Cook	Nominated
1995	Tony Award	Best Performance by a Featured Actress in a Musical	Brenda Braxton	Nominated
1995	Tony Award	Best Performance by a Featured Actress in a Musical	B.J. Crosby	Nominated
1995	Tony Award	Best Performance by a Featured Actress in a Musical	DeLee Lively	Nominated
1995	Tony Award	Best Direction of a Musical	Jerry Zaks	Nominated
1995	Tony Award	Best Choreography	Joey McKneely	Nominated
1996	Grammy Award	Best Musical Show Album		Won
