= Cornell Gunter =

American singer (1936–1990)

- Born: Cornelius E. Gunter; November 14, 1936; Coffeyville, Kansas, U.S.
- Died: February 26, 1990 (aged 53) Las Vegas, Nevada, U.S.
- Formerly of: The Coasters, The Platters, The Flairs

Cornell Gunter (November 14, 1936 – February 26, 1990) was an American rhythm and blues singer, most active in the 1950s and 1960s. He was born in Coffeyville, Kansas, and died in Las Vegas, Nevada, after being shot in his automobile. He was inducted into the Rock and Roll Hall of Fame in 1987 as a member of The Coasters.

== Biography ==
Gunter was an original member of The Platters. He had recorded with the yet-unnamed Platters, singing back-up on Big Jay McNeely's recording "Nervous Man Nervous" on Federal Records in 1953. Gunter also was a member of The Flairs and The Coasters. The title song from the 1957 Susan Oliver film, The Green Eyed Blonde, was sung by Gunter. Will "Dub" Jones and Gunter joined The Coasters as replacements for Bobby Nunn and Leon Hughes in early 1958. After Gunter left the Coasters, he toured with Dinah Washington. in 1961, he was part of a group called "D's Gentleman" which featured future members of The Dells Charles Barksdale and Johnny Carter as well as Richard Harris and William Herndon. In 1963, he formed his own Coasters group; they were usually billed as "The Fabulous Coasters". Gunter made several solo singles in the late 1950s and early 1960s, including a cover version of Sam Cooke's "You Send Me" on Dot Records in 1957.

In 1987, he was inducted into the Rock And Roll Hall Of Fame along with the rest of The Coasters.

Cornell's sister, Shirley Gunter, also recorded with The Flairs and released with the Queens and in solo in the late 1950s and early 1960s. Ace Records released a compilation album in 2006 of Shirley's recordings from the 1950s entitled Oop Shoop: The Flair and Modern Recordings 1953–1957.

Another sister, Gloria Gunter, recorded the singles "Move On Out" and "Your Love Reminds Me" (Arch #1610) in 1959. "Move On Out" was an answer to The Coasters' hit "Yakety Yak", on which Cornell sang. Both sides of the record were made available on CD in 2006. "Move On Out" appears on Rock 'n' Roll Mamas (Popcorn #6004), and "Your Love Reminds Me" appears on Rare Female Doo Wops (Popcorn #6005).

Gunter (who was gay and in later years preferred to spell his name Cornell Gunther) was in the process of making a new comeback, when an unknown assassin shot him in his car in Las Vegas, Nevada on February 26, 1990 (some files say February 27). The survivors of his group continue to tour as "The Original Cornell Gunter's Coasters Inc."

== Discography ==
=== Singles ===
- "I Had a Love" (Flair #1012) (1953)
- "This is the night for love/Let's make with some love (Flair #1044) (1954)
- "True Love" / "Peek, Peek-A-Boo" (Loma #701) (1955) (as The Ermines)
- "You Broke My Heart" / "Pretty Baby I'm Used To You Now" (Loma #703) (1956) (with The Ermines)
- "Keep Me Alive" / "Muchacha, Muchacha" (Loma #704) (1956) (with The Ermines)
- "I'm Sad" / "One Thing For Me" (Loma #705) (1956) (with The Ermines)
- "She Loves To Rock" / "In Self Defense" (ABC Paramount #9698) (1956) (with The Flairs)
- "You Send Me" / "Call Me A Fool" (Dot #15654) (1957)
- "Baby Come Home" / "I Want You Madly" (Eagle #301) (1957)
- "If We Should Meet Again" / "Neighborhood Dance" (Liberty #55096) (1957) (as Cornel Gunter)
- "Lift Me Up Angel" / "Rope Of Sand" (Warner Brothers #5266) (1962)
- "It Ain't No Use" / "In A Dream Of Love" (Warner Brothers #5292) (1962)
- "If I Had The Key To Your Heart" / "Wishful Thinking (Challenge #59281) (1965) (as Cornell Gunter and The Cornells)
- "Love in My Heart" / "Down in Mexico" (Together #101) (1976)

== See also ==
- List of homicides in Nevada
- List of unsolved murders (1980–1999)
