= Dub Jones =

Dub Jones may refer to:

- Dub Jones (American football) (1924–2024), American football player
- Dub Jones (singer) (1928–2000), American singer
