= Riot in Cell Block Number 9 =

"Riot in Cell Block #9"

Single by The Robins
- B-side: "Wrap It Up"
- Released: 1954
- Genre: R&B
- Length: 3:02
- Label: Spark
- Songwriter: Jerry Leiber and Mike Stoller

The Robins singles chronology
"Key to My Heart" (1954)	"Riot in Cell Block #9" (1954)	"Loop De Loop Mambo" (1954)

"Riot in Cell Block #9" is a R&B song composed by Jerry Leiber and Mike Stoller in 1954. The song was first recorded by The Robins the same year. That recording was one of the first R&B hits to use sound effects and employed a Muddy Waters stop-time riff as the instrumental backing.

== Lyrics ==
The song's setting takes place at a correctional facility. A man is serving his prison sentence for armed robbery. At 4:00 AM on July 2, 1953, he wakes up to an alarming disturbance; a jail riot. It started in cell block #4 and continued through the prison hall from cell to cell. The jailhouse warden, armed with a tommy gun, threatens to execute all the prisoners if the riot does not stop soon, but one of them, Scarface Jones, retaliates by carrying dynamite. Forty-seven hours later, 3:00 AM on July 4, 1953, the prison security let loose tear gas on the inmates and they return to their cells.

== Personnel ==
- Richard Berry, lead vocals
- Mike Stoller, piano
- Gil Bernal, saxophone
- Barney Kessel, guitar
- Ralph Hamilton, bass
- Jesse Sailes, drums

== Cover versions ==
The song has been covered by many cross-genre artists such as The Grateful Dead, Wanda Jackson, Vicki Young, Johnny Winter, Dr. Feelgood, The Blues Brothers, Wee Willie Harris, Commander Cody and his Lost Planet Airmen, Johnny Cash, and Flat Duo Jets.

The Beach Boys reworked the song as "Student Demonstration Time" for the 1971 album Surf's Up. The Beach Boys originally covered the song for their 1965 album, Beach Boys' Party!, but it was never officially released until two versions appeared on the 2015 compilation Beach Boys' Party! Uncovered and Unplugged.

It was also translated and performed in French by Michel Pagliaro as "Émeute dans la Prison" (Riot in the Prison). In his version it was July 13, 1968, at 4:00 am and originated in cell block #3. It was later covered by Éric Lapointe.

A Parody of the song called “The King of Everything” was used in “Pound Puppies and the Legend of Big Paw” as Marvin McNasty’s villain song.

== See also ==
- Riot in Cell Block 11, a 1954 film
