= Wake Me, Shake Me =

Single by The Coasters

from the album Coast Along with the Coasters
- B-side: "Stewball"
- Released: 1960
- Genre: R&B
- Length: 2:26
- Label: Atco 6168
- Songwriter(s): Billy Guy

The Coasters singles chronology
"Bésame Mucho" (1960)	"Wake Me, Shake Me" (1960)	"Shoppin' for Clothes" (1960)

"Wake Me, Shake Me" is a song written by Billy Guy and was recorded by The Coasters for their album, Coast Along with the Coasters. The song reached #14 on the R&B chart and #51 on The Billboard Hot 100 in 1960.
