= Carl Gardner =

American singer (1928–2011)

- Born: Carl Edward Gardner; April 29, 1928; Tyler, Texas, U.S.
- Died: June 12, 2011 (aged 83) Port St. Lucie, Florida, U.S.
- Occupation: Singer
- Formerly of: The Robins; The Coasters

Carl Edward Gardner (April 29, 1928 – June 12, 2011) was an American singer, best known as the foremost member and founder of The Coasters. Known for the 1958 song "Yakety Yak", which spent a week as number one on the Hot 100 pop list, he was inducted into the Rock and Roll Hall of Fame in 1987.

== Life and career ==
Gardner was born in Tyler, Texas, to Rebecca and Robert Gardner. As a singer, his first major career success came with The Robins, a rhythm and blues group that had a big hit in 1955, "Smokey Joe's Café".

After leaving that group in 1956, Gardner formed the Coasters with the Robins' bass singer Bobby Nunn, Leon Hughes and Billy Guy, at the behest of the songwriting/producing team of Jerry Leiber and Mike Stoller, and had a two-sided hit in 1957, "Young Blood" (on which Gardner sang lead) and "Searchin'". With new members Cornel Gunter and Will "Dub" Jones, the Coasters went on to produce several enduring classics of 1950s rock and roll music, including "Yakety Yak", "Charlie Brown", and "Poison Ivy".

Together with the other members of the Coasters – Cornell Gunter, Billy Guy and Will "Dub" Jones – Gardner was inducted into the Rock and Roll Hall of Fame in 1987.

Gardner's son, Carl Jr., officially joined the Coasters in late 2005, after Gardner semi-retired, although Carl Jr. had been touring with them since at least 1998. His father officially made him a member to carry on his group as the lead singer.

Since Gardner was the last of the original members the list of early Coaster songs performed live was limited in a sense, a fan recalls meeting Gardner after a concert in his last years, where this was mentioned:

"There was a nightclub in Fayetteville, NC called Cagney's and they announced they were having the Coasters. When on stage, they did their set and asked for requests. They did whatever was requested except for mine. I went outside with them between sets and spoke to the leader of the group. I asked him why they wouldn't do Run Red Run. He just smiled and said that he was the only member of the original Coasters and that these fellows had never rehearsed it. I told him it was my favorite and right then and there, the two of us did it. When they went back inside to do their next set, I was high. What a great experience."

In 1993, shortly after moving with wife Veta to Port St. Lucie, Florida, Gardner sought treatment for a nosebleed. He was ultimately diagnosed by an ENT specialist with a cancerous tumor of the nasopharynx "the size of a grapefruit", and was told chances of survival were slim. Nevertheless, after enduring weeks of radiation therapy, the cancer went into remission, never to recur. Despite some change in the sonority of his voice, Gardner continued to perform with the Coasters as lead singer.

Carl Gardner, Sr. died on June 12, 2011, after suffering with congestive heart failure and vascular dementia (according to the Coasters website). Carl, Jr., took over as lead singer, but was fired by Veta Gardner. Together, Carl Jr. and Thomas (Curly) Palmer vowed to keep the legacy alive by "The Coasters featuring Carl Gardner Jr. And Thomas Curly Palmer The legacy continuous". Carl Jr and Thomas Palmer both recorded with The Coasters before Carl Sr's death. Veta Gardner, Carl's widow, owns the rights to the Coasters name and manages a performing group, which has no original members.
