= Beach Boys' Party! =

Studio album by the Beach Boys
- Released: November 8, 1965
- Recorded: September 8–27, 1965
- Studios: Western, Hollywood
- Genres: Doo-wop; Rock and roll; Folk rock; lo-fi
- Length: 31:10
- Label: Capitol
- Producer: Brian Wilson

The Beach Boys chronology
Summer Days (And Summer Nights!!) (1965)	Beach Boys' Party! (1965)	Pet Sounds (1966)

The Beach Boys UK chronology
Little Deuce Coupe (1965)	Beach Boys' Party (1966)	The Beach Boys Today! (1966)

Singles from Beach Boys' Party!
- 1. "Barbara Ann" Released: December 20, 1965

Beach Boys' Party! (stylized as Recorded "Live" At A Beach Boys' Party!) is the tenth studio album by the American rock band the Beach Boys, and their third in 1965, consisting mostly of cover songs played with acoustic instruments. It reached No. 6 in the US and No. 3 in the UK. The album spawned one single, a cover of the Regents' "Barbara Ann", which reached No. 2 in the US and No. 3 in the UK, and was their highest-charting British single to that point.

Party! was recorded in a music studio and presented as an impromptu live recording of a party, with informal chatter by friends and family overdubbed later. The record company, Capitol, wanted an album for the holiday season, but as there was no new material ready, several options were considered, including a greatest hits album and a live album, before the band decided on the party theme. The Beach Boys covered songs by the Beatles, several doo-wop groups, Bob Dylan, and the Everly Brothers, as well as two of their own earlier hits performed in a tongue-in-cheek style. While the "beach party" atmospherics fit into the Beach Boys style to that point, the varied musical influences presaged the change of direction that would occur over the next several years beginning with Pet Sounds (1966).

Because of its stripped-down approach, Party! is considered to be the first "unplugged" type album. In 2015, Capitol issued Beach Boys' Party! Uncovered and Unplugged, an 81-track expansion and remix of the album.

== Background and recording ==
In August, after the release of Summer Days (And Summer Nights!!), the Beach Boys' leader Brian Wilson was contemplating his next studio effort, which would turn out to be Pet Sounds. Capitol Records requested a new album for the holiday season. Since The Beach Boys' Christmas Album had been released the previous year, as had a live performance via Beach Boys Concert, the "live party" idea was selected to reflect the togetherness of the holiday spirit. Sporadically during September, the band and their friends rehearsed current and older hits (including revisiting the Rivingtons' "Papa-Oom-Mow-Mow"). Although presented as an impromptu live recording of a continuous set of songs played at a small party, the songs were recorded and mixed individually in a sound studio as any regular studio album, and laughter and background chatter was mixed in during post-production.

The album included versions of the Beatles' "Tell Me Why", "You've Got to Hide Your Love Away" and "I Should Have Known Better"; "Devoted to You" by the Everly Brothers; the Phil Spector produced "There's No Other (Like My Baby)" and a send-up of their own "I Get Around" and "Little Deuce Coupe". David Leaf noted: "In an era when rock stars were beginning to take themselves more seriously, the Beach Boys showed how natural it was to make fun of themselves."

Author Geoffrey Himes wrote that the party theme was created to justify the casual arrangements. Music theorist Daniel Harrison wrote: "Party was an exercise in minimalistic production. ... The performances seem unrehearsed, the instrumental support is minimal (acoustical [sic] guitar, bongo drums, tambourine), and fooling around (laughing, affected singing, background conversation) pervades every track." It was Wilson's first exploration in "party tracks", a form of music which includes the sounds of people shouting and making noises as if at a party. (Note: The Beatles' "Yellow Submarine" and Bob Dylan's "Rainy Day Women ♯12 & 35" (1966) were similar examples of party tracks.) He would continue this approach with Smiley Smile in 1967. A friend of the group, Tony Rivers, revealed the true nature of the 'party' atmosphere to Record Mirror, who reported on it in March 1966. Rivers explained: "It's a joke record, they did it for a laugh. ... They had people talking and banging glasses together in the background so people'd think it was at a party." Rivers also commented on the deliberately out of tune singing.

Several other songs were also recorded, but not put on the album. This included renditions of the Drifters' "Ruby Baby", (Note: First released on Good Vibrations: Thirty Years of The Beach Boys (1993).) the Beatles' song "Ticket to Ride", the Rolling Stones' "(I Can't Get No) Satisfaction", Bob Dylan's "Blowin' in the Wind" and the Robins' "Riot In Cell Block #9". (Note: Later played live in the early 1970s, and subsequently reworked as "Student Demonstration Time" for the Beach Boys' Surf's Up album.)

== Promotion ==
The original release of Party! included a sheet of photographs which depicted the band at a party. In order to promote the album, Capitol distributed to dealers a million bags of potato chips which bore the album's cover art, intended to be given away to record buyers for free. The label also coordinated a motion floor merchandiser containing five Beach Boys LPs, full-color streamers for window displays, and full-scale radio and newspaper advertising.

== Reception ==
Professional ratings
Retrospective reviews
Review scores
Source	Rating
AllMusic	3.5/5 stars
Blender	4/5 stars
Encyclopedia of Popular Music	2/5 stars
The Great Rock Discography	4/10
The Guardian	1/5 stars
Popmatters	8/10
Record Mirror	3/5 stars
The Rolling Stone Album Guide	3/5 stars

Billboard evaluated that Party! would have strong sales potential: "The boys have a ball performing in this intimate, ad-lib program of hot material. ... [an] exciting, discotheque package."

In November 1965, the Beach Boys released the non-album single "The Little Girl I Once Knew" which repeatedly used a measure of silence in the arrangement and was reportedly disliked by radio programmers owing to their avoidance of having "dead air"; this has been cited as being partially responsible for the single stalling at US number 20. Still wanting to play new material by the band, radio disc jockeys around the United States began playing the last track of Party! straight off the LP, a cover of The Regents' "Barbara Ann". It received good listener response and was issued as a single by Capitol when they started hearing from radio programmers; it became a number 2 hit in early 1966.

=== Retrospective reviews ===
Richie Unterberger wrote: "In recent years, this album has gone up a few notches in critical esteem, praised for its loose, casual feel and insight into the group's influences. Realistically, though, its present-day appeal lies mostly with dedicated fans of the group, as fun and engaging as it is. Others will find the material shopworn in places, and the presentation too corny." Writer Jim Fusilli said: "This Beach Boys Party! really blows. ... They mock 'I Get Around' and 'Little Deuce Coupe.' Imagine doing that—mocking your own work, music some people cherish." Mitchell Cohen of the publication Best Classic Bands wrote that Party! is more reminiscent of the Beatles' Get Back sessions than the first "unplugged" album, observing: "Brian is there, but he doesn't do very much, ... [His production] credit seems almost insulting, because for the most part it's Mike's show, even more so on the naked sessions ... Carl and Dennis grab on to the Beatles tunes like a life raft, and Brian is in the corner. This isn't his party, but he'll have to clean up when it's over."

In 2020, Phoenix New Times included it in a list of "12 'Live' Albums That Are Anything But"; contributor Serene Dominic reinforced that although Beach Boys' Party! invented the "unplugged" live album, it was merely a fabrication as the album actually contains a fake party where "[every] potato chip crunch and even the mistakes were carefully rehearsed for the best fidelity." The Canadian band Sloan's album Recorded Live at a Sloan Party (1997) was inspired by Beach Boys' Party! and features a similarly staged 'party' setup.

== Alternative releases ==
In 1990, Beach Boys' Party! was paired on CD with Stack-o-Tracks, a 1968 album of instrumental mixes of Beach Boys tracks. The bonus tracks for this CD were instrumental mixes of "Help Me, Rhonda", "California Girls", and "Our Car Club". The Party! / Stack-o-Tracks CD was reissued in 2001. In 2012, the first stereo mix of Beach Boys' Party! was released.

On November 20, 2015, Capitol issued an 81-track expanded remix, Beach Boys' Party! Uncovered and Unplugged, containing the original album without overdubs followed by a selection of outtakes culled from the album's original five recording sessions.

== Track listing ==
Side one
No.	Title	Writer(s)	Lead vocal(s)	Length
1.	"Hully Gully" (The Olympics)	Fred Smith; Cliff Goldsmith	Mike Love	2:22
2.	"I Should Have Known Better" (The Beatles)	John Lennon; Paul McCartney	Carl Wilson; Al Jardine	1:40
3.	"Tell Me Why" (The Beatles)	Lennon; McCartney	Jardine; C. Wilson	1:46
4.	"Papa-Oom-Mow-Mow" (The Rivingtons)	Carl White; Al Frazier; Sonny Harris; Turner Wilson Jr.	Brian Wilson; Love	2:18
5.	"Mountain of Love" (Harold Dorman)	Dorman	Love	2:51
6.	"You've Got to Hide Your Love Away" (The Beatles)	Lennon; McCartney	Dennis Wilson	2:56
7.	"Devoted to You" (The Everly Brothers)	Boudleaux Bryant	Love; B. Wilson	2:13

Side two
No.	Title	Writer(s)	Lead vocal(s)	Length
1.	"Alley Oop" (The Hollywood Argyles)	Dallas Frazier	Love	2:56
2.	"There's No Other (Like My Baby)" (The Crystals)	Phil Spector; Leroy Bates	B. Wilson	3:05
3.	"Medley" ("I Get Around"/"Little Deuce Coupe")	B. Wilson; Love; Roger Christian	Love	3:12
4.	"The Times They Are a-Changin'" (Bob Dylan)	Dylan	Jardine	2:23
5.	"Barbara Ann" (The Regents)	Fred Fassert	B. Wilson; Dean Torrence	3:27

== Personnel ==
Credits from band archivist Craig Slowinski.

The Beach Boys

- Al Jardine – vocals, acoustic 6- and 12-string guitars, ashtray
- Bruce Johnston – vocals, bass guitar
- Mike Love – vocals
- Brian Wilson – vocals, bass guitar, piano, bongos
- Carl Wilson – vocals, acoustic 6- and 12-string guitars, bass
- Dennis Wilson – vocals, bongos, castanet, harmonica

Guests

- Hal Blaine – bongos
- Ray Avery – bongos
- Steve Korthof – bongos, tambourine
- Ron Swallow – tambourine
- Terry Melcher – tambourine
- Billy Hinsche – harmonica on "Mountain Of Love"
- Dean Torrence – co-lead vocal on "Barbara Ann"
- Marilyn Wilson – vocals

== Charts ==
Weekly chart performance
Chart (1965–66)	Peak position
UK Disc and Music Echo Top Ten LPs	7
UK Melody Maker Top Ten LPs	3
UK New Musical Express Best Selling LPs	3
UK Record Retailer LPs Chart	3
US Billboard Top LP's	6
US Cash Box Top 100 Albums	7
US Record World 100 Top LPs	5
West German Musikmarkt LP Hit Parade	4

Year-end chart performance
Chart (1966)	Ranking
US Billboard	84
US Cash Box	43
