= Maggie Hathaway =

American activist, blues singer, actor, sports writer, and golfer

Maggie Hathaway speaking at the NAACP Image Awards, Los Angeles, 1978

Maggie Mae Hathaway (July 1, 1911 – September 24, 2001) was an American activist, blues singer, actress, sportswriter and golfer. She began her career as an actress before venturing into recording in Los Angeles where she released a few singles. Hathaway became known in the 1950s for her activism and golfing. She co-founded the NAACP Image Awards in 1967.

== Life and career ==
A native of Campti, Louisiana, Hathaway traveled to Los Angeles in 1931 in hopes of playing piano in one of the clubs on Central Avenue, also known as "Black Broadway". Instead, she began her career in the area working as an extra in Hollywood films, usually as an "Egyptian" or an "exotic." After auditioning for Cabin in the Sky, Hathaway was hired as a body double for Lena Horne throughout much of the film; she later worked as Horne's stand-in in Stormy Weather. However, her Hollywood career ended when she refused to play an extra in a biopic about Woodrow Wilson which required her to wear a bandanna and sit on a bale of cotton. She then returned to singing in cabaret in Los Angeles clubs, recording several songs including “Bayou Baby Blues”, “School Girl Blues”, “A Falling Star”, and “When Gabriel Blows His Horn” with The Robins and “Here Goes a Fool” as a solo artist.

During the civil rights movement, Hathaway became a major activist in the Los Angeles-Hollywood region. After she took up golf as a pastime after winning a bet against Joe Louis in 1955, she began agitating against local golf courses which restricted black patrons from usage. By 1958, she began writing a golf column in the California Eagle about black professional players. She also wrote a golf column in the Los Angeles Sentinel.

In 1960, Hathaway organized the Minority Association for Golfers (MAG) to support young black golfers by advocating for golf-related employment. In 1963, Hathaway led a picket during the PGA at the Long Beach municipal golf course to protest a lack of golf jobs for black professional golfers. She also campaigned for an increase black player participation in PGA tournaments.

Her agitation spread to broader issues. Hathaway and friend, Barbara Walden, an actress and dancer, gathered 35 signatures required to establish a branch of the NAACP in Beverly Hills-Hollywood. The charter was granted on June 1, 1962 with Hathaway serving as President and Board members including Walden and attorney James L. Tolbert.

In 1967, she joined with Sammy Davis Jr. and Willis Edwards in holding the first NAACP Image Awards.

In 1975, Hathaway petitioned for Lee Elder to be invited to play in the Masters Tournament. During the following decades, she continued to write for the Los Angeles Sentinel. She organized opportunities for young minorities to play and received financial help from PGA players, including Jack Nicklaus.

Hathaway died on September 24, 2001.

== Personal life ==
She was married four times to different husbands, including King Coleman (from 1979 to 1984). Her daughter Ondra Louise Fleming was born in 1936.

== Legacy ==
In 1994, Hathaway was inducted into the National Black Golf hall of Fame. The Jack Thompson Golf Course in Los Angeles was renamed the Maggie Hathaway Golf Course in 1997.

== Discography ==
- 1947: Maggie Hathaway And Her Bluesmen – "Here Goes A Fool" / "Too Late To Be Good Blues" (Black & White 113)
- 1950: Maggie Hathaway With The Robins And 2 Sharps And A Natural – "A Falling Star" / "When Gabriel Blows His Horn" (Recorded In Hollywood 121)

== Filmography ==
She had numerous uncredited roles in films.

- Gang Smashers
