= Jerome Evans (singer) =

American R&B & doo-wop singer (1938–2003)

Jerome Evans (March 11, 1938 – November 30, 2003) was an American R&B and doo-wop singer of the 1960s and 1970s. He was born Jerome Albert Evans Sr.

== Biography ==
The late Jerome Evans Sr., father of (Silkski) Jerome Evans Jr., had been a member of The Cyclones, The Furys, The Lions, The Centennials, and Vernon Green & The Medallions. Evans has sung with The Coasters various other groups, "The Coasters Two Plus Two" (with Leon Hughes, Bobby Nunn, and Grady Chapman), "The Fabulous Coasters" (with Grady Chapman), and Bobby Nunn's "The Coasters Mark II." In 1977, he sang backup vocals with Billy Guy and Grady Chapman on "Paid The Price," a song from Michelle Phillips' album "Victim Of Romance." In the 1990s, he has also toured with The Drifters (Bobby Hendricks' Drifters) and with Vernon Green & The Medallions. Evans has also written songs such as "Gee Girl" by Bobby and Billy in 1962, and "I'll Do Anything For You" by Freda Payne in 1978. During the 1970s, he had also recorded "Charlie Chan" b/w "Dance With Charlie Chan" (Kris #8109). The record was released as by 'Private Eye' and Evans sang the lead vocals. He also performed "Charlie Chan" with Bobby Nunn's Coasters in the late 1970s. Before his death, he was working on a new CD to be called 'Life.'

Evans died in November 2003 in Lancaster, California from a heart attack at the age of 65. He is survived by his wife; his daughters, Teresa and Patricia; and his sons, Kenneth and Jerome Jr (Silkski).

== Discography ==
=== Group singles and recordings ===
- "Big Mary" / "Good Goodnight" (Forward #313) (1959) (The Cyclones)
- "So Tough" / "Got A Pain in My Head Over You" (Edsel #786) (1959) (The Furys)
- "Two Timing Lover" / "The Feast of the Beasts" (Rendezvous #116) (1960) (The Lions)
- "No One" / "Giggles" (Mack IV #2) (Everest #19388) (1960) (The Lions)
- "My Dear One" / "The Wayward Wind" (Dot #16180) (1961) (The Centennials)
- "Zing Went The Strings of My Heart" (Mack IV #112) (1962) (The Furys)
- "If There's A Next Time" (Mack IV #114) (1962) (The Furys)
- "I Really Feel Good" (Mack IV #115) (1962) (The Furys)
- "Till The Thirteenth Month" / "Girl of the World" (Mack IV #104) (1962) (The Lions)
- "Where My Money Goes" / "Cover Girl" (Aura #396) (1964) (The Furys)
- "Anything For You" / "Cat 'N Mouse" (World Pacific #386) (1964) (The Furys)
- "Baby You Can Bet Your Boots" / "The Man Who Has Everything" (Liberty #55692) (1964) (The Furys)
- "If I Didn't Have A Dime" / "Dream" (Liberty #55719) (1964) (The Furys)
- "Look at Me"/ "Am I Ever Gonna See My Baby" (Minit #32034) (about 1964) (Vernon Green & The Medallions)
- "Can You Talk" / "You Don't Know" (Dootone #479) (1973) (Vernon Green & The Medallions)
- "Searchin' '75" / "Young Blood" (Chelan #2000) (1975) (The Coasters Two Plus Two)
- "Paid The Price" (1977) (from album Victim of Romance) (A&M #4651) (Michelle Phillips)
- "Charlie Chan" / "Dances" With Charlie Chan (Kris #8109) (1970s) (Private Eye)
