= The Furys (doo-wop group) =

American musical group

The Furys were an American doo-wop group of the 1960s featuring tenors Tony Allen and Jimmy Green with baritone Jerome Evans. They were best known for a cover of "Zing! Went the Strings of My Heart, produced by James McEachin, and their performance of Gene Pitney's “If I Didn't Have a Dime".

== Discography ==
- A: Another Fella / B: If There's A Next Time Mack IV Records 114 1962
- A: Zing! Went The Strings Of My Heart / B: Never More Mack IV 112 Dec 1962
- A: Dolow / B: The Storm Cedar Records Philadelphia] 301 1963
- A: Cover Girl / B: Where My Money Goes Aura Records 395 1964
- A: The Man Who Has Everything / B: Baby You Can Bet Your Boots Liberty Records 55692 Apr 1964
- A: What Is Soul / B: I Lost My Baby Mack IV 118 Sep 1965
- A: Just A Little Mixed Up / B: I'm Satisfied With You Keymen Records K-104 1967
