= Searchin' =

Single by the Coasters

from the album The Coasters
- A-side: "Young Blood"
- Released: March 1957
- Recorded: February 15, 1957 (Los Angeles)
- Genre: Rock and roll, R&B
- Length: 2:36
- Label: Atco
- Songwriter: Jerry Leiber and Mike Stoller
- Producers: Jerry Leiber, Mike Stoller

The Coasters singles chronology
"One Kiss Led to Another" (1956)	"Searchin'" (1957)	"Idol with the Golden Head" (1957)

"Searchin'" is a song written by Jerry Leiber and Mike Stoller specifically for the Coasters. Atco Records released it as a single in March 1957, which topped the R&B Chart for twelve weeks. It also reached number three on the Billboard singles chart.

Although the Coasters had previously done well on the rhythm and blues charts, "Searchin'" (along with "Young Blood" on the flip side) sparked the group's rock and roll fame.

== Writing ==
The lyrics, written by Leiber, use vernacular phrasing. The plot revolves around the singer's determination to find his love, wherever she may be, even if he must resort to detective work. The song's gimmick was to cite law-enforcement figures from popular culture such as Sherlock Holmes, Charlie Chan, Joe Friday, Sam Spade, Boston Blackie, Bulldog Drummond, and the North-West Mounted Police (the Mounties). The vocals of the Coasters' lead singer Billy Guy are raw and insistent. Driving the song is a pounding piano rhythm of two bass notes alternating on every second beat.

The theme of the song is searching for love: "Well, I'm searching, Yeah I'm gonna find her". The refrain is simple variations of this phrase, "Gonna find her, yeah ah, gonna find her".

== Personnel ==
The song was recorded in Los Angeles on February 15, 1957.

- Mike Stoller, piano
- Gil Bernal, saxophone
- Barney Kessel, guitar/mandolin
- Adolph Jacobs, guitar
- Ralph Hamilton, bass
- Jesse Sailes, drums
- A.L. "Abe" Stoller, drums
- Joe Oliveria, congas

== Other versions ==
The Spencer Davis Group included the song on their 1965 album Their First LP. The album reached number six in the UK charts in towards the end of January 1966.

Otis Blackwell released a version of this song on his 1977 album titled These are my songs!. Blackwell attributed the track to Lieber/Stoller, but the album brought to light many tracks for which Blackwell was the original composer. This was the only song on the album that was not a Blackwell composition.

Johnny Rivers released a version of the song as a medley with "So Fine", which reached number 113 on the U.S. pop chart in 1973.

Singer/songwriter Paul McCartney chose "Searchin'" as one of his Desert Island Discs in 1982. He performed the song with the Beatles during their audition for Decca Records on January 1, 1962 (with somewhat mangled lyrics that included a mention of Peter Gunn).

The song was performed by Floyd Pepper in an episode of The Muppet Show. It was famously used in Brad Bird's 1999 animated film, The Iron Giant.

The song was also recorded and performed by Sharon, Lois & Bram for both of their children's television series Sharon, Lois & Bram's Elephant Show (1987) and Skinnamarink TV (1997).

Jack Eubanks released an instrumental version on the 1961 album Guitar Sounds Of The South.
