= Vernon Harrell =

American singer-songwriter (1940–1997)

Vernon "Verne" Harrell (June 5, 1940 – March 15, 1997) was an American R&B singer and songwriter.

== Career ==
Harrell was from New York City and released several singles in the 1960s and 1970s. He also went by the name Keidar Syenon Harrell. He co-wrote songs with J. R. Bailey (a former member of The Cadillacs and writer of "Everybody Plays the Fool" by The Main Ingredient). Several songs penned by the two include "Soul Shing-A-Ling" and "Seven Days Too Long" by Chuck Wood in 1966, "Sweet, Sweet Lovin'" by The Platters in 1967, and "Lonely Singer" by Kurtis Scott. Both sides of another New York single by Forest Hairston "Go On And Tell" b/w "No Second Chance" on Viney Records was co-written by Harrell with Doris Horne.

Harrell replaced Billy Guy in the 1960s as a member of The Coasters, while Guy was busy working on a solo career. After 1969, singer Jimmy Norman replaced Harrell as the regular substitute for Billy Guy. Harrell never recorded with The Coasters, he only performed on stage. One song Harrell recorded called "Do It To It" on Calla Records has the same backing track that was used on The Coasters' recording of "Lovey Dovey." Other versions of "Do It To It" by The Sandpebbles and Tony Fox, both released on Calla Records in 1968, supposedly also have the same backing track.

Harrell released two records in 1971, one called "Muhammed Ali" on Brunswick Records, about the famous boxer Muhammad Ali, and another one on United Artists Records.

He has also written songs under the names Keidar Syeon and Keidar Syenon, co-writing a few under the name with J. R. Bailey. In 1965, he co-wrote the song "Daisy Daisy" with Sol Meshel and J. R. Bailey under the name Keidar Syenon Harrell. He released a record for Capitol Records in 1972 under the name of Keidar Syeon. The songs were "Unchain My Heart" (originally recorded by Ray Charles in 1961) and Van Morrison's "Brown Eyed Girl." He had been living in Bronx, New York before his death in 1997 at the age of 56.

== Discography ==
=== Singles ===
- Slick Chick/Beg Borrow And Steal (Lescay #3003) (1962)
- Slick Chick/Cold, Cold Heart (Lescay #3011) (1962) (as Vernon Harrel)
- Nobody But Nobody/Such A Lonely Guy (Ascot #2144) (1963)
- Do Unto Others/Little Joe (Beltone #2031) (1963) (as Vernon Harrel)
- I Had A Dream My Record Was Number One/Beg Borrow And Steal (Beltone #2038) (1960s)
- Baby Don’tcha Worry/All That's Good (Decca #31721) (1964) (as Vernon Harrell and Little Gigi)
- Your Love/Daisy Daisy (Score #1008) (1966)
- If This Ain’t Love (Ain't No Cows In Texas)/A Man Has Got To Cry Sometime (Score #1010) (1966)
- Do It To It/Can't Take The Hurt (Calla #136) (1969)
- Muhammed Ali (Stereo)/Muhammed Ali (Mono) (Brunswick #55448) (1971) (as Verne Harrell)
- Brown Eyed Girl/Unchain My Heart (Capitol #3377) (1972) (as Keidar Syeon)
- Slick Chick/Holding A Dream (Side B by Gene Latter) (RNB #007) (2004)

=== Various artists compilations ===
- Hits & Misses: Muhammad Ali & The Ultimate Sound Of Fist Fighting (Trikont) (2005)
