= Dub Jones (singer) =

Will "Dub" Jones
- Born: Will J. Jones; May 14, 1928; Shreveport, Louisiana, U.S.
- Died: January 16, 2000 (aged 71) Long Beach, California, U.S.
- Occupation: Singer
- Instrument: Vocals

Will J. "Dub" Jones (May 14, 1928 – January 16, 2000) was an American R&B singer. He was born in Shreveport, Louisiana, and died in Long Beach, California. He was inducted as a member of the Rock and Roll Hall of Fame as a member of the Coasters in 1987. Other groups with which he recorded include the Cadets, the Crescendos, and the Charades.

== Biography ==
Jones is a singer who is most notable as the bass vocalist for The Coasters and The Cadets. His best known vocals were on The Cadets' biggest hit single "Stranded in the Jungle" and his bass vocals on The Coasters' hits "Yakety Yak" and "Charlie Brown". Cornell Gunter and Jones joined The Coasters in early 1958, as replacements for Leon Hughes and Bobby Nunn.

Jones also appeared on various other recordings. In 1956, he sang on The Crescendos' recording "Sweet Dreams". In 1957, he sang with Jesse Belvin & The Space Riders on the Modern #1027 single "My Satellite" / "Just To Say Hello". He had also recorded with Cora Washington, billed as Cora And Dub. He is said to have sung lead on The Trammps' cover version of "Zing! Went the Strings of My Heart" (on which he had previously sung lead while with The Coasters). He went on to record with later versions of The Coasters – in 1976 on the album The World Famous Coasters (with Leon Hughes); and with Billy Guy's group of Coasters in 1977, recording such songs as "Ain't No Greens In Harlem" and "Jumbo Bwana". Jones also teamed up with former fellow Cadets member Lloyd McCraw for gospel recordings including "Joshua Fit The Battle" as The Melodians. Jones and The Cadets sang backing vocals on a few of Richard Berry's recordings in 1955. These included "Jelly Roll", which appeared on the 2001 Ace compilation album of the group The Dreamers entitled They Sing Like Angels. In 1987, Jones also sang backing vocals on the song "We Got It All" by The Charades.

Jones died in January 2000, from the effects of diabetes. He was 71 years old.

== Discography ==
=== Solo singles ===
- "Hands Across The Table" / "Love Can Do Most Anything" (Modern #1024) (1957) (as Will Jones & The Cadets)
- "Cold Blooded Women" / "What Can I Do" (MJC #101) (circa 1960) (as Dub & Cora)
- "Heaven's Not So Far" (MJC #108) (about 1960) (as Dub Jones)
- "Cold Blooded Women" / "Heaven's Not So Far" (MJ #102) (about 1969) (A-side by Dub & Cora)
- "Cold Blooded Women" / "What Can I Do" (Cotillion #44079) (1970) (as Dub & Cora)
