= Gil Bernal =

American singer (1931–2011)

- Born: February 4, 1931; Watts, Los Angeles, California, U.S.
- Died: July 17, 2011 (aged 80) Glendale, California, U.S.
- Genres: Rock & roll, pop, R&B
- Occupation: Musician
- Instruments: Saxophone; Vocals
- Labels: Spark Records, Amaret Records

Gil Bernal (February 4, 1931 – July 17, 2011) was an American singer and session musician. His saxophone can be heard on recordings such as "Searchin'" by The Coasters. In the 1950s, he played on Duane Eddy's 1958 album Have 'Twangy' Guitar Will Travel. In later years, he played on Warren Zevon's 2003 album The Wind and the Chávez Ravine album by Ry Cooder.

== Background ==
Bernal was born on February 4, 1931, in Watts, Los Angeles. His father was Sicilian and his mother Mexican.

== Career ==
As well as a musician, Bernal was a singer in his own right. As singer he sang on his own singles, which included "Keep Those Wanderin' Eyes Off My Baby", "Tower of Strength" and "The Dogs".

=== Early years to the 1950s ===
By the time he was in his teens, he was an accomplished singer and saxophonist. In the early days, he played at parties. In 1950, he ended up replacing a sax player whom Lionel Hampton had fired. Bernal then toured nationally with Hampton in a band that included Quincy Jones and Little Jimmy Scott. In the period between 1954 and 1955, Bernal recorded under his own name. He recorded "Easyville" and "The Whip" for the Spark Records label. Two others he recorded for the label were "Strawberry Stomp" and "King Solomon's Mines". "The Whip" did receive some airplay and was used by Alan Freed as the opening theme for his late R&B show. He did some session work for the label, which included "Riot in Cell Block Number 9" by The Robins. He played on Duane Eddy's 1958 hit "Rebel Rouser" and also "Stalkin'".

=== 1960s ===
His single "This Is Worth Fighting For" was picked by Billboard magazine in July 1967 to chart in the hot 100. Also in 1967, the film Banning that starred Robert Wagner and Jill St. John and Gene Hackman was released. Bernal sang the song "The Eyes of Love" which was featured in the film. He received an Academy Award nomination for it. He performed "It Sure Is Groovy" for the 1967 movie In the Heat of the Night, starring Sidney Poitier and Rod Steiger. Bernal also sang "The Next Train Out", featured in the 1969 film Blood of Dracula's Castle.

=== 1970s ===
In 1970, he was signed to Amaret Records with the intention to be produced Joe Porter and Jerry Styner.

=== 1990s to 2000s ===
In 1997, Bernal appeared in the film The End of Violence. In the 1990s, he received a phone call from Ry Cooder, who had known him for about five years, asking him to come to Havana in the next few days to play on a recording by Ibrahim Ferrer. Bernal did no't have his passport in order and it would have been weeks before he could get it sorted. In the end, the solution was to overdub the saxophone parts. So, following Cooder's instructions, he added the parts. In 2005, Bernal contributed to Cooder's concept album Chavez Ravine.

In 2012, his record "The Dogs" bw "James" was re-released by Jukebox Jam Series in 2012. The A-side is a Northern Soul favorite, while the B-side is a tribute to civil rights movement figure James Meredith. Bernal had agreed to the terms of reissuing the 45 but died before the record was released.

== Death ==
In 2011, he died in Glendale, California, at the age of 80.

== Discography ==
Singles
Title	Release info	Year	Notes
"The Whip" / "Easyville"	Spark 102	1954	
"Strawberry Stomp" / "King Solomon's Blues"	Spark 106	195?	
"Keep Those Wanderin' Eyes Off My Baby" / "I'll Come Back To You"	American 45 1034	1956	
"Tab, Rory And Rock, Rock" / "Take Me Back"	Verve V-10087X45	1957	
"The Dogs" / "James"	Bump's Record Co B1501	1961	
"This Is Worth Fighting For" / "They Say I Don't See	RCA Victor 47-9261	1967	
"To Make A Big Man Cry" / "Can You Love A Poor Boy"	RCA Victor 47-9390	1967	
"Tower of Strength" / "The Man"	Imperial 66332 1968	1968	
"The Dogs" / "James"	Jukebox Jam Series JBJ 1028	2012	Reissue

Albums
Title	Release info	Year	Notes
Sensual and Latin	Jimi Lane Records		

Other
Title	Release info	Year	Notes
"The Eyes of Love"	featured in Banning (1967)	1967	Academy Award nominated performance. Lyrics by Bob Russell and music by Quincy Jones
"Nina"	featured in In Cold Blood (1967)	1967	Lyrics and music by Quincy Jones
"The Next Train Out"	theme song to Blood of Dracula's Castle (1969)	1969	Lyrics by Bob Russell and music by Lincoln Mayorga

== Links ==
- Gil Bernal at IMDb
- Gil Bernal Wikipedia Germany

=== Discussions ===
- Gil Bernal discussed at Monstor Movie Music
- Gil Bernal discussed at Soul Source
