= Bobby Nunn (doo-wop musician) =

American boxer; R&B singer

Ulysses B. "Bobby" Nunn Sr. (September 20, 1925 – November 5, 1986) was an American R&B singer with the musical groups The Robins and original bass vocalist of The Coasters. He was born in Birmingham, Alabama, United States, and died of heart failure in Los Angeles, California, U.S.

== Biography ==
Nunn was a welterweight boxing champion in the U.S. Air Force. After his discharge in 1947 he moved to Watts, California. He became a member of the A-Sharp Trio with Billy Richards, Roy Richards, and Ty Terrell, and they eventually became The Robins. Nunn would record some duets with Little Esther as well as some solo recordings in the early 1950s. In 1952 he recorded for Sage & Sand Records with Bobby Byrd and Ty Terrell. Bobby Byrd is better known as Bobby Day of "Rockin' Robin" fame.

In 1955, Nunn and Carl Gardner split from The Robins to become The Coasters with Leon Hughes and Billy Guy. After leaving The Coasters, he teamed with another former Coaster Leon Hughes to record as The Dukes in 1959. Two singles were released "Looking For You" b/w "Groceries, Sir" (Flip #343), and "I Love You" b/w "Leap Year Cha Cha" (Flip #344).

Nunn recorded backup vocals with a vocal group for Dorsey Burnette on Imperial Records. These two songs "Try" and "You Came As A Miracle" were recorded on August 28, 1958, and were released as a single (Imperial #5561) in March 1959. In 1965, Nunn arranged the song "Whip It On Me Baby" by The O'Jays on Imperial Records. This song was earlier recorded by fellow Coaster Billy Guy on Double-L Records in 1963. Throughout the 1960s and 1970s, Nunn had his own group of Coasters called "The Coasters Mark II" with members Grady Chapman, Bobby Sheen, and Billy Richards Jr. (who is nephew to Billy Richards). Nunn also appeared on a record by "The Coasters Two Plus Two" in 1975 called "Searchin '75" b/w "Young Blood" (released on Chelan Records and produced by Bumps Blackwell). The other members of this group included Leon Hughes, Grady Chapman, and Jerome Evans. In 1985, Nunn's group of The Coasters had appeared on the NBC variety show "Our Time" hosted by Karen Valentine, "Fabian's Good Time Rock 'N' Roll" oldies special, and a Churches Chicken commercial (which included members Nunn, Sheen, Richards, and Sonny Chaney). After Nunn's death in 1986, Bobby Sheen and Billy Richards Jr. continued to tour with Nunn's group of The Coasters.

Nunn is interred at the Evergreen Cemetery, Los Angeles.

(Another Bobby Nunn recorded for Motown Records in 1982. He is no relation to this Bobby Nunn.)

== Discography ==
=== Singles ===
- "Why Did You Leave Me Baby?" / "Alone About Midnight" (Hamptone International #605) (1/1950)
- "Bring Your Lovin’ Back To Me" / "I Got A Country Gal" (Blue #105) (1950) (as Billy Nunn)
- "Anticipating Blues" / "Hard Luck Women & Strife" (B-side by Big Duke with Pete Johnson All-Stars) (Dootone #302) (1950)
- "Clappin’ And Shoutin’" / " I'm Tellin’ You Baby" (Blue #115) (1951) (as Billy Nunn)
- "Christmas Bells" / "Two Sisters" (B-side instrumental by Que Martin) (Recorded In Hollywood #244) (1951)
- "Saturday Night Daddy" / "Mainliner" (B-side by Little Esther) (Federal #12100) (1952) (Bobby Nunn & Little Esther)
- "You Took My Love Too Fast" / "Streetlights (B-side by Little Esther) (Federal #12122) (1952) (Bobby Nunn & Little Esther)
- "Please Don’t Hurt Me" / "Delicious Are Your Kisses" (Sage & Sand #203) (1952) (with Bobby Byrd & Ty Terrell)
- "Candle Of Love" / "Peanut Brittle" (Sage & Sand #204) (1952) (with Bobby Byrd & Ty Terrell)
- "Like" / "Henrietta" (Titan #1703) (1960) ("Henrietta" with Ginny Tyler)
- "Sixty Minute Man Is Back"/"Been Thinking It Over" (Tishman 714)(????)

=== Various artists compilations ===
- Blues For Dootsie: The Blue And Dootone Sides (Ace #1115) (2006)
- Rhythm And Blues Christmas (Ace #1128) (2006)
- From The Doo Wop Vaults Of Titan Records (TRCD #1700)
