= The Robins =

American vocal group

- Also known as: The Robins; A-Sharp Trio; The Four Bluebirds
- Origin: San Francisco, California, U.S.
- Genres: Doo-wop
- Years active: 1945–1961
- Labels: Spark, Whippet, RCA
- Past members: Bobby Nunn; Terrell "Ty" Leonard; Billy Richard; Roy Richard; Grady Chapman; Carl Gardner; H. B. Barnum; Bobby Sheen "Little" Billy Richards, Jr.

The Robins were a successful and influential American R&B group of the late 1940s and 1950s, one of the earliest such vocal groups who established the basic pattern for the doo-wop sound. They were founded by Ty Terrell, and twin brothers Billy Richards and Roy Richards. Bobby Nunn soon joined the lineup. They began their career as the Bluebirds but switched to recording as the Robins in May 1949. In 1955, the group disagreed over whether to remain on the West Coast or sign with Atlantic Records and move to the East Coast. This led to a split within the group. Music producers and songwriters Jerry Leiber and Mike Stoller took former Robins members Nunn and Carl Gardner, recruited singers Leon Hughes and Billy Guy, and formed the Coasters. The founding Richards brothers and Tyrell continued to record as the Robins until 1961.

== Original members ==
- Bobby Nunn (lead/bass)
- Terrell "Ty" Leonard (tenor)
- William Gene "Billy" Richard (tenor)
- Roy Richard (baritone/bass)
- Grady Chapman (lead/tenor)

== Deaths ==
Roy Richard died on May 1, 1983.

Bobby Nunn died from a heart attack on November 5, 1986.

Billy Richard died from a fall while exercising on December 10, 2007.

Grady Chapman died of congestive heart failure on January 4, 2011.

Carl Gardner died on June 12, 2011, after many years leading The Coasters.

== Singles ==
| A Side | B Side | Released | Catalog No. | Notes |
|---|---|---|---|---|
| "My Baby Done Told Me" | "Courtroom Blues" | 1948 | Excelsior 540 | By Johnny Otis. Recorded as the Four Bluebirds |
| "Around About Midnight" | "You Sure Look Good to Me" | 1949 | Score 4010 | Recorded as the Robins |
| "Don't Like the Way You're Doing" | "Come Back Baby" | 1949 | Aladdin 3031 | Recorded as the Robins |
| "If I Didn't Love You So" | "If It's So Baby" | 1949/12 | Savoy 726 | |
| "Double Crossin' Blues" | "Ain't Nothin' Shakin'" | 1950/01 | Savoy 731 | By Leon Sims, with Little Esther on backup vocals |
| "Double Crossin' Blues" | "Back Alley Blues" | 1950 | Savoy 731 | By Beale Street Boys), with Little Esther on backup vocals |
| "Turkey Hop Part One" | "Turkey Hop Part Two" | 1950/02 | Savoy 732 | |
| "Our Romance Is Gone" | "There Ain't No Use Beggin'" | 1950/04 | Savoy 738 | |
| "I'm Living O.K." | "There's Rain in My Eyes" | 1950/06 | Savoy 752 | |
| "I'm Through" | "You're Fine But Not My Kind" | 1950/08 | Savoy 762 | |
| "Cry Baby" | "I'm Not Falling in Love with You" | 1950 | Regent 1016 | By Johnny Otis, Mel Walker & the Bluenotes |
| "Race of Man" | "Bayou Baby Blues" | 1950 | Recorded in Hollywood 112 | With Maggie Hathaway |
| "A Falling Star" | "When Gabriel Blows His Horn" | 1950 | Recorded in Hollywood 121 | As Maggie Hathaway & the Robins |
| "I Found Me a Sugar Daddy" | "Gonna Have a Merry Christmas" | 1950/12 | RPM 313 | As the Nic Nacs, with Mickey Champion |
| "Rockin'" | "That's What the Good Book Says" | 1951/03 | Modern 20-807 | As the Robins |
| "I Found Me a Sugar Daddy" | "You Didn't Want My Love" | 1951 | RPM 316 | As the Nic Nacs |
| "School Girl Blues" | "Early Morning Blues" | 1951 | Recorded in Hollywood 150 | With Maggie Hathaway |
| "I Found Me a Sugar Daddy" | "Gonna Have a Merry Christmas" | 1951 | RPM 342 | As the Nic Nacs |
| "Saturday Night Daddy" | "Mainliner" | 1952/07 | Federal 12100 | With Little Esther on backup vocals |
| "A Fool Such As I" | "My Heart's the Biggest Fool" | 1952 | RCA Victor 5175 | |
| "Oh Why" | "All Night Baby" | 1952 | RCA Victor 5271 | |
| "How Would You Know?" | "Let's Go to the Dance" | 1953 | RCA Victor 5434 | |
| "My Baby Done Told Me" | "I'll Do It" | 1953 | RCA Victor 5486 | |
| "Ten Days in Jail" | "Empty Bottles" | 1953 | RCA Victor 5489 | |
| "Get It Off Your Mind" | "Don't Stop Now" | 1953/11 | RCA Victor 5564 | |
| "I Made a Vow" | "Double Crossin' Baby" | 1953/12 | Crown 106 | |
| "Sacroiliac Swing" | "The World is Changing" | 1954 | Crown 108 | As the Drifters |
| "Key to My Heart" | "All I Do Is Rock" | 1954/02 | Crown 120 | As the Robins |
| "Riot in Cell Block #9" | "Wrap It Up" | 1954/05 | Spark 103 | |
| "Loop De Loop Mambo" | "Framed" | 1954 | Spark 107 | |
| "If Teardrops Were Kisses" | "Whadaya Want?" | 1954 | Spark 110 | |
| "One Kiss" | "I Love Paris" | 1955 | Spark 113 | |
| "I Must Be Dreamin'" | "The Hatchet Man" | 1955 | Spark 116 | |
| "Smokey Joe's Cafe" | "Just Like a Fool" | 1955/10 | Spark 122 | |
| "Smokey Joe's Cafe" | "Just Like a Fool" | 1955/12 | Atco 6059 | |
| "Cherry Lips" | "Out of the Picture" | 1956/07 | Whippet 200 | |
| "Hurt Me" | "Merry Go Rock" | 1956 | Whippet 201 | |
| "Since I First Met You" | "That Old Black Magic" | 1957 | Whippet 203 | |
| "A Fool In Love" | "All of a Sudden My Heart Sings" | 1957 | Whippet 206 | |
| "Every Night" | "Where's the Fire?" | 1957 | Whippet 208 | |
| "In My Dreams" | "Keep Your Mind in Me" | 1958 | Whippet 211 | |
| "Snowball" | "You Wanted Fun" | 1958 | Whippet 212 | |
| "A Quarter to Twelve" | "Pretty Little Dolly" | 1958 | Knight 2001 | |
| "A Little Bird Told Me" | "It's Never Too Late" | 1959 | Knight 2008 | |
| "Just Like That" | "Whole Lot of Imagination" | 1959 | Arvee 5001 | |
| "Live Wire Susie" | "Oh No" | 1960 | Arvee 5013 | |
| "Ding Dong (Saw Wood Mountain)" | "Sweet Thing" | 1960 | Eldo 109 | As the Ding Dongs |
| "The White Cliffs of Dover" | "How Many More Times" | 1961 | Lavender 001 | |
| "White Cliffs of Dover" | "Image of a Girl" | 1961 | Gloria Gold 3101 | B-side by the Safaris |
| "Magic of a Dream" | "Mary Lou Loves to Hootchy Kootchy Koo" | 1961 | Lavender 002 | |
