= Adolph Jacobs =

American guitar player

Adolph Jacobs, later known as Al Jacobs (April 15, 1939 – July 23, 2014), was an American guitar player, best known as an original member of The Coasters.

== Biography ==
Born Adolf Jacobs in Pineland, Sabine County, Texas, he played guitar with Vernon Green and The Medallions in 1955. He also wrote one of their songs, "I Know", in 1955. He became a member of The Coasters in early-mid 1956. He recorded a solo record in 1959 "Move Around Easy" b/w "Walkin' And Whistlin'" on Class Records. He worked with Johnny "Guitar" Watson and Larry Williams in the 1960s. In 1971, he recorded another solo record "Gettin' Down With The Game" b/w "Do It" on Romark Records. The record was produced by Kent Harris, the co-writer of one of The Coasters' hits, "Shoppin' For Clothes" from 1960. Again, he worked with Kent Harris in the 1970s, recording some jazz recordings. In 1972, he played guitar on Little Richard's album The Second Coming.

Jacobs has led his own band in California. His orchestra even backed the Will "Dub" Jones and Billy Guy led Coasters groups a few times during the late 1980s and early 1990s.

Adolph legally changed his name to Al Jacobs. In 2012 Jacobs obtained management and formed a new group called Al Jacobs' Coasters. He was managed by MJ Shelby at Aries of NoHo Promotions. On July 23, 2014, Al Jacobs died. His last public performance was on October 20, 2013, at the Doo Wopp Hall of Fame Concert, hosted by Harvey Robbins, at the North Shore Music Theater in Beverly, Massachusetts. He was inducted into the Doo Wop Hall of Fame and wanted his guitar given to Harvey Robbins upon his death.

== Discography ==
=== Solo records ===
- "Move Around Easy" / "Walkin' And Whistlin'" (Class #253) (1959)
- "Gettin' Down With The Game" / "Do It" (Romark #101) (1971)
- Title Unknown (Kent Harris) (1970's) (jazz recordings)

=== Various group singles and recordings ===
- "A Little Taste" / "Thin Possum" (Raja #65001) (1963) (Elliot Shavers) (played guitar)
- Little Richard: The Second Coming (Reprise #2017) (1972) (played guitar)
- Don And Dewey: Jungle Hop (Specialty #7008) (1991) (played guitar)
- Billy Lamont Meets Chuck Edwards (Official #5678) (played guitar)
- The Coasters: The Complete Singles As & Bs 1954-62 (played guitar)
- A Happy Noel (compilation CD) (includes "Twas The Night Before Christmas" by Adolph Jacobs)
