= Spark Records =

American record label

Spark Records was a record label started by Jerry Leiber and Mike Stoller around 1954 in Los Angeles, California. Artists released on Spark Records included Willy & Ruth, The Sly Fox, Ervin "Big Boy" Groves, and The Robins. Leiber and Stoller eventually decided that while they wanted to write songs and make records, but did not want to deal with the mechanics of publishing records, so they sold the label to Atlantic Records.

== See also ==
- List of record labels
