= Jesse Sailes =

Jazz drummer and session musician (1919–2007)

Jesse John Sailes
- Also known as: Jesse Sailes
- Born: December 3, 1919; Denver, Colorado, U.S.
- Origin: Los Angeles, California, U.S.
- Died: September 5, 2007 (aged 87) Los Angeles, California, U.S.
- Genres: Jazz; R&B; rock and roll
- Occupations: Drummer; session musician
- Instrument: Drums
- Years active: 1940s–1950s

Jesse John Sailes (December 3, 1919 – September 5, 2007) was a jazz drummer and session musician who performed on many hit records in the 1940s and 1950s such as Eddie Cochran's "Skinny Jim" and The Coasters' Riot in Cell Block Number 9, Framed, and Searchin'.

He was born in Denver, Colorado on December 3, 1919. He lived and worked in Los Angeles where he died on September 5, 2007.
