= Yakety Yak =

1958 song by Jerry Leiber and Mike Stoller

- A-side label of the US vinyl single

Single by the Coasters
- B-side: "Zing! Went the Strings of My Heart"
- Released: April 1958
- Recorded: March 17, 1958
- Genre: Rock and roll
- Length: 1:52
- Label: Atco 6116
- Songwriters: Jerry Leiber, Mike Stoller
- Producers: Jerry Leiber, Mike Stoller

The Coasters singles chronology
"Gee, Golly" (1958)	"Yakety Yak" (1958)	"The Shadow Knows" (1958)

Music video
- "Yakety Yak" (2007 Remaster) on YouTube

"Yakety Yak" is a song written, produced, and arranged by Jerry Leiber and Mike Stoller for the Coasters and released on Atco Records in 1958. It spent seven weeks as #1 on the R&B charts and a week at #2 on the Hot 100. This song was one of a string of singles released by the Coasters between 1957 and 1959 that dominated the charts, making them one of the biggest performing acts of the early rock and roll era.

In 1999, the original 1958 recording on the ATCO label by the Coasters was inducted into the Grammy Hall of Fame.

== Song ==
The song is a "playlet," a word Stoller used for the glimpses into teenage life that characterized the songs he and Lieber wrote and produced. The lyrics describe the listing of household chores to a kid, presumably a teenager, the teenager's response ("yakety yak") and the parents' retort ("don't talk back") — an experience very familiar to a middle-class teenager of the day. Leiber has said the Coasters portrayed "a white kid’s view of a black person’s conception of white society." The serio-comic street-smart "playlets" etched out by the songwriters were sung by the Coasters with a sly, clowning humor, while the tenor saxophone of King Curtis filled in, in the up-tempo doo-wop style. The group was openly "theatrical" in style — they were not pretending to be expressing their own experience.

The threatened punishments in the song's humorous lyrics are as follows:

"Take out the papers and the trash, or you don't get no spendin' cash"
"If you don't scrub that kitchen floor, you ain't gonna rock and roll no more"
"Just finish cleaning up your room. Let's see that dust fly with that broom. Get all that garbage out of sight, or you don't go out Friday night."

And the refrain?:

"Yakety yak. Don't talk back."

The last verse reads, "Just tell your hoodlum friends outside you ain't got time to take a ride."

== Personnel ==
- Mike Stoller – piano
- King Curtis – tenor saxophone
- Alan Hanlon – guitar
- Adolph Jacobs – guitar
- Wendell Marshall or Lloyd Trotman – bass
- Joe Marshall – drums
- Chino Pozo – congas

== Parodies ==
- Vince Vance & the Valiants, one of various groups parodying "Barbara Ann" as "Bomb Iran" in 1980, created a similarly-themed 2005 parody titled "Yakety Yak (Bomb Iraq)".

== Other uses in popular culture ==
- The tenor saxophone solo by King Curtis inspired the 1963 Boots Randolph song "Yakety Sax".
- The song's name was used for the code name of Ubuntu 16.10, a Linux operating system with its versions all named after animals.
- Paul Bettany performs the song in a pivotal scene as Vision in the WandaVision episode "Filmed Before a Live Studio Audience".
- A video of the song was done in "Toon TV", the twelfth episode of the third season of Tiny Toon Adventures, set in the Bronx in 1958 and featuring Plucky Duck, who has been ordered by his father to take out the trash and do the laundry.
- The Ripley family sings along to the song in the opening scene of the 1988 film The Great Outdoors.
- The song is also featured in the 1986 film Stand by Me.
- Arnold Schwarzenegger's character in the film Twins is shown to have a great affinity towards the song..
- The 1991 all-star charity single "Yakety Yak, Take it Back" featured a substantial rearrangement of the original song with new lyrics by Leiber referencing environmental causes.

== See also ==
- List of number-one R&B singles of 1958 (U.S.)
- List of number-one singles of 1958 (U.S.)
