= The Coasters =

American vocal group

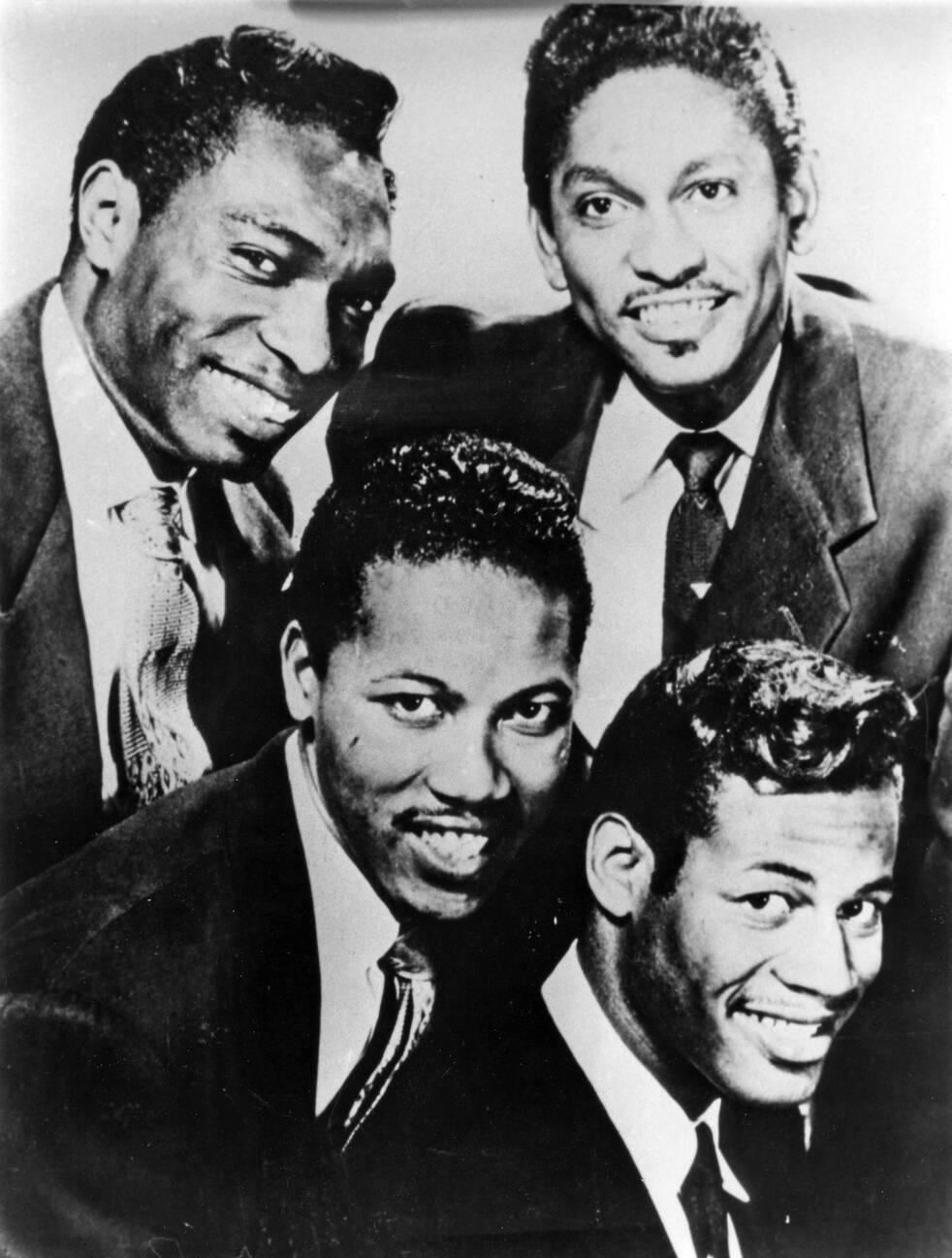
- The Coasters, 1950s

Background information
- Origin: Los Angeles, California, U.S.
- Genres: Rhythm and blues; rock and roll; doo-wop
- Years active: 1955–present
- Labels: Atco; Date; King
- Spinoff of: The Robins
- Members: J.W. Lance; Primotivo Candelaria; Robert Fowler; Johnny Stone III
- Past members: Carl Gardner; Billy Guy; Bobby Nunn; Leon Hughes; Adolph Jacobs; Young Jessie; Will "Dub" Jones; Cornell Gunter; Elbert "Sonny" Forriest; Earl Carroll; Thomas "Curley" Palmer; Tommy Turner; Vernon Harrell; Ronnie Bright; Jimmy Norman; Alvin Morse; Carl Gardner Jr.; Eddie Whitfield; Dennis Anderson; James Williams

The Coasters are an American rhythm and blues/rock and roll vocal group who had a string of hits in the late 1950s. With hits including "Down in Mexico", "Searchin'", "Young Blood", "Charlie Brown", "Poison Ivy", and "Yakety Yak", their most memorable songs were written by the songwriting and producing team of Leiber and Stoller. Although the Coasters originated outside of mainstream doo-wop, their records were so frequently imitated that they became an important part of the doo-wop legacy through the 1960s. In 1987, they were the first vocal group inducted into the Rock and Roll Hall of Fame.

== History ==
The Coasters were formed on October 12, 1955, when Carl Gardner and Bobby Nunn left Los Angeles-based rhythm-and-blues group the Robins and signed to Atlantic Records. Dubbed the Coasters because they had moved from the West Coast to the East Coast, the original lineup comprised the vocal quartet of Gardner, Nunn, Billy Guy, and Leon Hughes (who was replaced by Young Jessie on a couple of their early Los Angeles recordings), plus guitarist Adolph Jacobs up until his departure in 1959.

The songwriting team of Jerry Leiber and Mike Stoller started Spark Records and in 1955 produced "Smokey Joe's Cafe" for the Robins (their sixth single with Leiber and Stoller). The record was popular enough for Atlantic Records to offer Leiber and Stoller an independent production contract to produce the Robins for Atlantic. Only two of the Robins—Gardner and Nunn—were willing to make the move to Atlantic, recording their first songs in the same studio as the Robins had done (Master Recorders). In late 1957, Carl Gardner and Billy Guy moved to New York with newcomers Cornell Gunter and Will "Dub" Jones to reform the Coasters. The new quartet was from then on stationed in New York, although all had Los Angeles roots.

The Coasters' association with Leiber and Stoller was an immediate success. Together they created a string of "storytelling" hits from the original era of rock and roll. According to Leiber and Stoller, getting the humor to come through on the records often required more recording "takes" than for a typical musical number.

Their first single, "Down in Mexico", was an R&B hit in 1956. The following year, the Coasters crossed over to the pop chart in a big way with the double-sided "Young Blood"/"Searchin'". "Searchin'" was the group's first U.S. Top 10 hit, and topped the R&B chart for 13 weeks, becoming the biggest R&B single of 1957 (all were recorded in Los Angeles).

"Yakety Yak" (recorded in New York), featuring King Curtis on tenor saxophone, included the famous lineup of Gardner, Guy, Jones, and Gunter, and became the act's only national number one single, topping both the pop and R&B charts. The next single, "Charlie Brown", reached number two on both charts. It was followed by "Along Came Jones", "Poison Ivy" (number 1 for almost two months on the R&B chart), and "Little Egypt (Ying-Yang)".

Changing popular tastes and changes in the group's line-up contributed to a lack of hits in the 1960s. During this time, Billy Guy was also working on solo projects; the New York singer Vernon Harrell was brought in to replace him for stage performances. Later members included Earl "Speedo" Carroll (lead of the Cadillacs), Ronnie Bright (the bass voice on Johnny Cymbal's "Mr. Bass Man"), Jimmy Norman, and guitarist Thomas "Curley" Palmer. The Coasters signed with Columbia Records' Date label in 1966, reuniting with Leiber and Stoller (who had parted ways with Atlantic Records in 1963), but never regained their former fame. In 1971, the Coasters had a minor chart entry with "Love Potion No. 9", a song that Leiber and Stoller had written for the Coasters, but instead gave to the Clovers in 1959. In Britain, a 1994 Volkswagen TV advertisement used the group's "Sorry But I'm Gonna Have to Pass", which led to a minor chart placement in that country.

In 1987, the Coasters became the first group inducted into the Rock and Roll Hall of Fame, crediting the members of the 1958 configuration (except for guitarist Adolph Jacobs): Carl Gardner, Cornell Gunter, Billy Guy, and Will "Dub" Jones. The Coasters also joined the Vocal Group Hall of Fame in 1999.

Several groups used the name in the 1970s, touring throughout the country, though original member Carl Gardner held the legal rights to it. Gardner continued to tour with the Coasters and made many attempts to stop bogus groups with no connection to the original group using the name. In late 2005, Carl's son Carl Gardner Jr. took over as lead with the group when his father retired. The Coasters' line-up then consisted of Carl Gardner Jr., J. W. Lance, Primo Candelara, and Eddie Whitfield. Carl Jr. later left this group and has started his own group with Curley Palmer. Carl's widow Veta owns the rights to the Coasters name, having already been their manager since 1986.

Leon Hughes, the last surviving member of the original Coasters, died of natural causes on March 1, 2023, at the age of 92. Prior to his death, he performed with his own group.

Several former members of the band met untimely ends. Saxophonist King Curtis, known as the "Fifth Coaster," was fatally stabbed by two drug addicts outside his apartment building in 1971. Cornelius Gunter was murdered in a Las Vegas parking garage in 1990.

== Group members ==
List of current members from the official Coasters website run by Veta Gardner's Official Coasters, Inc.

Current members

- Joe Lance Williams ("J.W. Lance") – lead vocals, previously tenor vocals (July 2001 – present)
- Primotivo "Primo" Candelaria – tenor (first tenor) vocals (October 2008 – present)
- Robert Fowler – bass vocals (January 2015 – present)
- Johnny Stone III – baritone vocals (November 2025 – present)

Former members

Rock 'n' Roll Hall of Fame inductees listed in bold.

- **Carl Gardner** – lead vocals (1955–2005; died 2011)
- **Billy Guy** – baritone vocals (1955–1973; died 2002)
- Bobby Nunn – bass vocals (1955–1957; died 1986)
- Leon Hughes – tenor vocals (1955–1957; died 2023)
- Adolph Jacobs – guitar (1956–1959/1960; died 2014)
- Young Jessie – tenor vocals (substitute 1957; died 2020)
- **Will "Dub" Jones** – bass vocals (1958–1967; died 2000)
- **Cornell Gunter** – tenor vocals (1958–1961; died 1990)
- Elbert McKinley "Sonny" Forriest – guitar (1959–1961; died 1999)
- Earl "Speedo" Carroll – tenor vocals (1961–1979; died 2012)
- Thomas "Curley" Palmer – guitar (1962–2011; died 2020)
- Vernon Harrell – baritone vocals (substitute 1965–1967)
- Ronnie Bright – bass vocals (1968–2009; died 2015)
- Jimmy Norman – baritone vocals (1973–1978, 1980–1997; substitute 1969–1972; died 2011)
- Alvin Morse – baritone vocals (1997–2008)
- Carl Gardner, Jr. – tenor vocals (1997–2001 and 2004), lead vocals (2005–2011)
- James Williams - baritone vocals (2023-2025)
- Eddie Whitfield – bass vocals (November 2009–2015 or November 2009–2016)
- Dennis Anderson – baritone and second tenor vocals (June 2011 – September 2023)

== Discography ==
=== Studio albums ===
- November 1957: The Coasters, Atco 33-101
- September 1960: The Coasters One by One – Atco LP 33-123 (SD33-123 stereo)
- March 1971: Hungry (Joy Records JOYS 189) (Stereo)
- April 1972: On Broadway – King K-1146-498 (KS-1146-498 stereo)
- March 2015 Musical Favorites (Stardust Records CLP 2112) (Stereo)

=== Compilation albums ===
- 1957: The Coasters – Atco LP 33-101
- 1959: The Coasters' Greatest Hits – Atco LP 33-111 (SD33-111 rechanneled stereo 1960)
- January 1962: Coast Along with the Coasters – Atco LP 33-135 (SD33-135 alternate stereo edition)
- 1965: That Is Rock & Roll – Clarion LP 605 (SD-605 stereo)
- 1971: Their Greatest Recordings: The Early Years – Atco LP SD33-371 (stereo compilation with alternates)

=== Charting singles ===
The Coasters recorded many songs that were released as two-song record singles and several appeared in the charts, including Billboard's Hot 100 and Hot R&B singles charts and the UK Singles Chart.

List of singles with year, title, label, peak chart positions, album
Year	Title A-side / B-side	Label (US)	Peak chart positions			Original album
Year	Title A-side / B-side	Label (US)	Billboard Hot 100	Billboard R&B	UK Singles	Original album
1956	"Down in Mexico" / "Turtle Dovin'"	Atco (45-6064)	—	8	—	The Coasters
1956	"One Kiss Led to Another" / "Brazil"	Atco (45-6073)	73	11	—	The Coasters
1957	"Searchin'" /	Atco (45-6087)	3	1	30	The Coasters
1957	"Young Blood"	Atco (45-6087)	8	1	—	The Coasters
1958	"Yakety Yak" / "Zing! Went the Strings of My Heart"	Atco (45-6116)	1	1	12	The Coasters' Greatest Hits
1959	"Charlie Brown" / "Three Cool Cats"	Atco (SD-45-6132)	2	2	6	The Coasters' Greatest Hits
1959	"Along Came Jones" b/w "That Is Rock & Roll"	Atco (45-6141)	9	14	—	The Coasters' Greatest Hits
1959	"Poison Ivy" / "I'm a Hog for You"	Atco (45-6146)	7; 38	1	15	The Coasters' Greatest Hits
1959	"Run Red Run" /	Atco (45-6153)	36	29	—	Coast Along
1960	"What About Us"	Atco (45-6153)	47	17	—	Coast Along
1960	"Bésame Mucho" (Part 1) / (Part 2)	Atco (45-6163)	70	—	—	
1960	"Wake Me, Shake Me" b/w "Stewball"	Atco (45-6168)	51	14	—	Coast Along
1960	"Shoppin' for Clothes" b/w "The Snake and the Book Worm"	Atco (45-6178)	83	—	—	Coast Along (B-side)
1961	"Wait a Minute" / "Thumbin' a Ride"	Atco (45-6186)	37	—	—	Coast Along (A-side)
1961	"Little Egypt (Ying-Yang)" b/w "Keep on Rolling"	Atco (45-6192)	23	16	—	Coast Along
1961	"Girls Girls Girls" (Part II) / (Part I)	Atco (45-6204)	96	—	—	Coast Along (A-side)
1964	"T'ain't Nothin' to Me" b/w "Speedo's Back in Town"	Atco (45-6287)	64	20	—	

=== Billboard Year-End performances ===
Year	Song	Year-End Position
1957	"Searchin'"	21
1958	"Yakety Yak"	21
1959	"Charlie Brown"	17
1959	"Poison Ivy"	54
1959	"Along Came Jones"	80

== Bibliography ==
- Carl Gardner – Yakety Yak I Fought Back - My Life with The Coasters (Veta Gardner, AuthorHouse, 2007, ISBN 978-1-4259-8981-1)
- Bill Millar – The Coasters (Star Books, 1974, ISBN 0-352-30020-5)
