= Jerry Leiber and Mike Stoller =

American songwriting and record producing duo (1950–2011)

Leiber and Stoller
- Mike Stoller (left) and Jerry Leiber (right) flanking Elvis Presley on the cover of Leiber and Stoller's joint autobiography, Hound Dog

Background information
- Genres: Pop; R&B; rock and roll; Broadway
- Occupations: Songwriter and record producer duo (Leiber – lyricist Stoller – composer)
- Years active: 1950–2011
- Label: Spark
- Jerry Leiber
- Birth Name: Jerome Leiber
- Born: April 15, 1933; Baltimore, Maryland, U.S.
- Died: August 22, 2011 (aged 78); Los Angeles, California, U.S.
- Mike Stoller
- Birth name: Michael Stoller
- Born: March 13, 1933 (age 93); New York City, U.S.

Leiber and Stoller were an American songwriting and record-production duo, consisting of lyricist Jerome Leiber (/ˈliːbər/; April 25, 1933 – August 22, 2011) and composer Michael Stoller (born March 13, 1933). They wrote many R&B and pop hits, as well as numerous Broadway standards.

Leiber and Stoller found success as the writers of such crossover hit songs as "Hound Dog" (1952) and "Kansas City" (1952). Later in the 1950s, particularly through their work with the Coasters, they created a string of ground-breaking hits—including "Young Blood" (1957), "Searchin'" (1957), "Yakety Yak" (1958), "Poison Ivy" (1959), and "Charlie Brown" (1959) — that used the humorous vernacular of teenagers sung in a style that was openly theatrical rather than personal.

Leiber and Stoller wrote hits for Elvis Presley, including "Love Me" (1956), "Jailhouse Rock" (1957), "Loving You", "Don't", and "King Creole". They also collaborated with other writers on such songs as "On Broadway", written with Barry Mann and Cynthia Weil; "Stand By Me", written with Ben E. King; "Young Blood", written with Doc Pomus; and "Spanish Harlem", co-written by Leiber and Phil Spector. They were sometimes credited under the pseudonym Elmo Glick. In 1964, they launched Red Bird Records with George Goldner and, focusing on the "girl group" sound, released some of the notable songs of the Brill Building period.

In all, Leiber and Stoller wrote or co-wrote more than 70 chart hits. They were inducted into the Songwriters Hall of Fame in 1985 and the Rock and Roll Hall of Fame in 1987.

== Biography ==
=== 1950s ===
Both Leiber and Stoller were born to Jewish families, Leiber in Baltimore, Maryland, and Stoller in Queens, New York. They met in Los Angeles, California, in 1950, where Leiber was a senior at Fairfax High and Stoller, a Belmont High School grad, was a freshman at Los Angeles City College. After school, Stoller played piano and Leiber worked in Norty's, a record store on Fairfax Avenue. When they met, the pair found they shared a love of blues and rhythm and blues. In 1950, Jimmy Witherspoon recorded and performed their first commercial song, "Real Ugly Woman".

Their first hit composition was "Hard Times", a rhythm and blues tune recorded by Charles Brown in 1952. "Kansas City", first recorded in 1952 (as "K. C. Loving") by rhythm & blues singer Little Willie Littlefield, became a No. 1 pop hit in 1959 for Wilbert Harrison. In 1952, the partners wrote "Hound Dog" for blues singer Big Mama Thornton, which became a hit for her in 1953. The 1956 Elvis Presley rock and roll version, which was a takeoff of the adaptation that Presley picked up from Freddie Bell's lounge act in Las Vegas, was an even bigger hit. Presley's showstopping mock-burlesque version of "Hound Dog", playfully bumping and grinding on the Milton Berle Show, created such public outcry and controversy that on The Steve Allen Show they slowed down his act, with an amused Presley in a tuxedo and blue suede shoes singing his hit to a Basset Hound. Allen pronounced Presley "a good sport", and the Leiber-Stoller song would be forever linked to Presley.

They formed Spark Records in 1954 with their mentor, Lester Sill. Their songs from this period include "Smokey Joe's Cafe" and "Riot in Cell Block #9", both recorded by the Robins.

The label was later bought by Atlantic Records, which hired Leiber and Stoller in an innovative deal that allowed them to produce for other labels. This, in effect, made them the first independent record producers. At Atlantic, they revitalized the careers of the Drifters and wrote a number of hits for the Coasters, a spin-off of the Robins. Their songs from this period include "Charlie Brown", "Searchin'", "Yakety Yak", "Stand By Me" (written with Ben E. King), and "On Broadway" (written with Barry Mann and Cynthia Weil). For the Coasters alone, they wrote 24 songs that appeared in the US charts.

In 1955, Leiber and Stoller produced a recording of their song "Black Denim Trousers and Motorcycle Boots" with a white vocal group, the Cheers. Soon after, the song was recorded by Édith Piaf in a French translation titled "L'Homme à la Moto". The European royalties from another Cheers record, "Bazoom (I Need Your Lovin')", funded a 1956 trip to Europe for Stoller and his first wife, Meryl, on which they met Piaf. Their return to New York was aboard the ill-fated SS Andrea Doria, which was rammed and sunk by the Swedish liner MS Stockholm. The Stollers had to finish the journey to New York aboard another ship, the Cape Ann. After their rescue, Leiber greeted Stoller at the dock with the news that "Hound Dog" had become a hit for Elvis Presley. Stoller's reply was, "Elvis who?" They went on to write more hits for Presley, including the title songs for three of his movies—Loving You, Jailhouse Rock, and King Creole—as well as the rock and roll Christmas song "Santa Claus Is Back in Town" for Presley's first Christmas album.

On March 9, 1958, Leiber and Stoller appeared together on the TV panel quiz show What's My Line? as rock and roll composers of "Hound Dog", "Jailhouse Rock" and "Don't". They were not household names and did not appear as celebrity mystery guests (a regular feature of the show) but as ordinary people with an unusual “line” of work. They even signed in under their own names, as the producers apparently were certain that the panel would not know who they were.

=== Post-1950s ===
In the beginning of the 1960s, Leiber and Stoller started Daisy Records and recorded Bob Moore and The Temps (with Roy Buchanan) on their label.

In the early 1960s, Phil Spector served an apprenticeship of sorts with Leiber and Stoller in New York City, developing his record producer's craft while observing and playing guitar on their sessions, including the guitar solo on the Drifters' "On Broadway".

After leaving the employ of Atlantic Records—where they produced, and often wrote, many classic recordings by the Drifters with Ben E. King—Leiber and Stoller produced a series of records for United Artists Records, including hits by Jay and the Americans ("She Cried"), the Exciters ("Tell Him"), and the Clovers ("Love Potion #9").

In the 1960s, Leiber and Stoller founded and briefly owned Red Bird Records, which issued the Shangri-Las' "Leader of the Pack" and the Dixie Cups' "Chapel of Love".

After selling Red Bird, they continued working as independent producers and songwriters. Their best-known song from this period is "Is That All There Is?" recorded by Peggy Lee in 1969; it earned her a Best Female Pop Vocal Performance Grammy. Earlier in the decade, they had a hit with Lee with "I'm a Woman" (1962).

Their last major hit production was "Stuck in the Middle With You" by Stealers Wheel, taken from the band's 1972 eponymous debut album, which the duo produced. In 1975, they recorded Mirrors, an album of art songs with Peggy Lee. A remixed and expanded version of the album was released in 2005 as Peggy Lee Sings Leiber and Stoller. Also in 1975, they produced the Procol Harum album Procol's Ninth, which included the UK Top 20 single "Pandora's Box" and a version of Leiber and Stoller's "I Keep Forgettin'".

In the late 1970s, A&M Records recruited Leiber and Stoller to write and produce an album for Elkie Brooks; Two Days Away (1977) proved a success in the UK and most of Europe. Their composition "Pearl's a Singer" (written with Ralph Dino & John Sembello) became a hit for Brooks, and remains her signature tune. In 1978, mezzo-soprano Joan Morris and her pianist-composer husband William Bolcom recorded an album, Other Songs by Leiber and Stoller, featuring a number of the songwriters' more unusual (and satiric) works, including "Let's Bring Back World War I", written specifically for (and dedicated to) Bolcom and Morris; and "Humphrey Bogart", a tongue-in-cheek song about obsession with the actor. In 1979, Leiber and Stoller produced another album for Brooks: Live and Learn.

In 1982, Steely Dan member Donald Fagen recorded their song "Ruby Baby" on his album The Nightfly. That same year, former Doobie Brothers member Michael McDonald released "I Keep Forgettin' (Every Time You're Near)", inspired by Leiber and Stoller's "I Keep Forgettin'", for which they were eventually given a 50% songwriting credit; a similar arrangement was made for the Oak Ridge Boys' crossover hit "Bobbie Sue" that same year.

In 1991, the charity music video and CD single "Yakety Yak, Take it Back", performed by a number of musicians ranging from Ozzy Osbourne to Pat Benatar, featured a drastically rearranged version of "Yakety Yak" with new lyrics - written by Leiber - promoting recycling.

==== 2000s ====
In 2009, Simon & Schuster published Hound Dog: The Leiber and Stoller Autobiography, written by Leiber and Stoller with David Ritz. As of 2007, their songs are managed by Sony/ATV Music Publishing.

With collaborator Artie Butler, Stoller wrote the music to the musical The People in the Picture, with book and lyrics by Iris Rainer Dart. Stoller and Butler's music received a 2011 Drama Desk Award nomination.

On August 22, 2011, Leiber died in Cedars Sinai Medical Center in Los Angeles, aged 78, from cardio-pulmonary failure. He was survived by his sons Jed, Oliver, and Jake.

Stoller wrote both music and lyrics to the song "Charlotte", recorded by Steve Tyrell and released in advance of the 2012 Democratic National Convention in Charlotte, North Carolina.

Stoller is the musical composer for the new musical Beaches, which premiered on Broadway on April 22, 2026.

=== Awards and honors ===
Leiber and Stoller won Grammy Awards for "Is That All There Is?" in 1969, and for the cast album of Smokey Joe's Cafe, a 1995 Broadway musical revue based on their previously released work. Smokey Joe's Cafe was also nominated for seven Tony Awards, and became the longest-running musical revue in Broadway history.

Other awards include:

- 1982 – The Oak Ridge Boys' recording of "Bobbie Sue," co-written by Leiber and Stoller, certified Gold by the RIAA
- 1985 – Induction into the Songwriters Hall of Fame
- 1987 – Induction into the Rock & Roll Hall of Fame
- 1988 – Elvis Presley's recording of "Hound Dog" placed in the Grammy Hall of Fame
- 1991 – ASCAP Founders' Award
- 1994 – A star placed on the Hollywood Walk of Fame in front of 7083 Hollywood Blvd., and their handprints embedded into the Hollywood Rockwalk
- 1996 – National Academy of Songwriters Lifetime Achievement Award
- 1997 – Distinguished Artist Award/Los Angeles Music Center
- 1998 – Honorary Doctorate of Music from Berklee College of Music
- 1999 – NARAS (Grammy) Trustees Award
- 2000 – Johnny Mercer Award/National Academy of Popular Music
- 2000 – Ivor Novello International Songwriters Award
- 2005 – ASMAC President's Award
- 2005 – "Kansas City" named official song of Kansas City, Missouri
- 2005 – World Soundtrack Award/Flanders International Film Festival
- 2017 – Elvis Presley's recording of "Jailhouse Rock" placed in the Grammy Hall of Fame
- 2022 – BMI Icon Award

=== Legacy ===
In the 1950s the rhythm and blues of the black entertainment world, up to then restricted to black clubs, was increasing its audience share in areas previously reserved for traditional pop music, and the phenomenon now known as crossover became apparent.

Leiber and Stoller affected the course of modern popular music in 1957, when they wrote and produced the crossover double-sided hit by the Coasters "Young Blood"/"Searchin'". They released "Yakety Yak", which was a mainstream hit, as was the follow-up, "Charlie Brown". This was followed by "Along Came Jones", "Poison Ivy", "Shoppin' for Clothes", and "Little Egypt (Ying-Yang)".

They produced and co-wrote "There Goes My Baby", a hit for the Drifters in 1959, which introduced the use of strings for saxophone-like riffs, tympani for the Brazilian baion rhythm they incorporated, and lavish production values into the established black R&B sound, laying the groundwork for the soul music that would follow.
