= Billy Guy =

American singer (1936–2002)

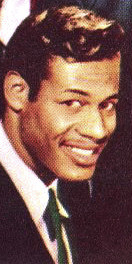
- Guy in 1957

Background information
- Born: Frank Phillips, Jr. June 20, 1936; Itasca, Texas, U.S.
- Died: November 5, 2002 (aged 66) Clark County, Nevada, U.S.
- Formerly of: The Coasters, Bip and Bop

Billy Guy (June 20, 1936 – November 5, 2002) was an American singer, best known as a lead singer for the Coasters. He was inducted into the Rock and Roll Hall of Fame in 1987.

== Biography ==
Born Frank Phillips in Texas, Guy is best known as a member of the Coasters, singing lead on such hits as "Searchin'", "Little Egypt", "Run Red Run", "Wait A Minute", among others. Songwriters Jerry Leiber and Mike Stoller praised his "marvelous sense of comedy and timing."

Before Guy joined The Coasters in 1955, he was part of a comedy singing duo called "Bip and Bop". One single, "Ding Dong Ding", b/w "Du-Wada-Du", was released on Aladdin Records in 1955. He made a number of solo records during the 1960s and 1970s. He did about a dozen or so solo recordings in 1963 for Double-L Records which later show up on collections as by The Coasters, most notably the albums "Hungry" (Joy #189, 1971, released in the UK) and "It Ain't Sanitary" (Trip #8028, 1973).

He also produced records for others in the late 60s and early 70s, including "Love Won't Wear Off" (Calla Records) in 1968 by J.R. Bailey and a spoken words album by Universal Messengers called "An Experience In The Blackness Of Sound" (Turbo/All Platinum Records) about 1969. Bailey was a former member of The Cadillacs and writing partner of Vernon Harrell (who had replaced Guy as a member of The Coasters in the 1960s on stage only). Guy and Bailey had a record company, GuyJim Records. A single released by C. Alexander And The Natural 3 called "Pay Them No Mind" b/w "Somebody Special" was released on the GuyJim label. Guy released a comedy album on Snake Eyes/All Platinum Records in 1972 called "The Tramp Is Funky".. His record "Foxey Baby/Shake A Leg" was the only release on Chalco Records, a label created by Ed Chalpin and Jocko Henderson in 1966. The label's first release was intended to be Jayne Mansfield's record "Suey" but it was later released on London Records instead.

He produced a double-album by Pearl Box Revue called "Call Me Miss-ter" on Snake Eyes/All Platinum Records, which was a spoken word album with four drag queens, including Dorian Corey. These two records are X-rated material. On his single "The Ugly", b/w "Hug One Another", it states that the songs were from the album "A Little Of This, A Little Of That". In 1977, he appeared, along with Grady Chapman and Jerome Evans, on a recording "Paid The Price" by Michelle Phillips on her album "Victim Of Romance".

Billy Guy died on November 5, 2002, in Clark County, Nevada, of cardiovascular disease.

== Discography ==
=== Singles ===
- Ding Ding Dong/Du-Wada-Du (Aladdin #3287) (1955) (as Bip and Bop)
- As Quiet As It's Kept/Here I Am (ABC Paramount #10320) (1962)
- It Don't Take Much/She's A Humdinger (ABC Paramount #10397) (1962)
- Whip It On Me, Baby/Women (a.k.a. The Prophet) (Double-L #719) (1963)
- Foxey Baby/Shake A Leg (Chalco #5002) (1966)
- I'm Sorry ‘Bout That/Lookin' Like A Nut Nut (GuyJim #GJ-587) (about 1967) (as The New Way)
- Lookin' Like A Nut Nut/Here ‘Tis (Sew City #109) (1967) (as Billy Guy & The Odds 'N' Ends)
- If You Want To Get Ahead, Shake A Leg/I'm Sorry About That (Verve #10485) (1967)
- Let Me Go Getto/ (No Side B) (All Platinum #2320) (1970)
- The Ugly/Hug One Another (All Platinum #2323) (1971)
- All I Need Is Love/Shake A Leg (Bell #124) (1971) (as Happy) (also released as Happy Cats)
- Watergate (Put Some Funk On, Cause The Money's Been Long Gone)/Hockey-Puck (Black Circle #102) (1970's) (produced by Billy Guy & H. B. Barnum) (as Billy Guy and The Coasters)
- You Move Me/Take It Easy Greasy (Sal-Wa #1001) (1975) (as Billy Guy and The Coasters)
- Put Your Own Words To It/You Move Me (Sniff #395) (about 1975) (as Billy) ("Put Your Words To It" is an instrumental version of Sal-Wa recording "Take It Easy Greasy")
- Ain't No Greens In Harlem/Jumbo Bwana (Polydor #2040-273) (1977) (as Billy Guy and The Coasters)

=== Albums ===
- Various Artists: Washington Committee (Double L #DL-2302) (Promo LP) (1963) (includes "Women" and "Whip It On Me Baby")
- Universal Messengers: An Experience In The Blackness Of Sound (Turbo/All Platinum) (about 1969) (produced only)
- A Little Of This And A Little Of That (All Platinum) (about 1971) (possibly unreleased)
- Hungry (Joy #189) (England) (1971) (includes solo tracks recorded in 1962) (released as by The Coasters)
- The Tramp Is Funky (Snake Eyes/All Platinum #9000) (1972)
- Pearl Box Revue: Call Me Misster (Snake Eyes/All Platinum #9001) (about 1972) (produced and appeared on album)
- It Ain't Sanitary (Trip #8028) (1962) (includes solo tracks recorded in 1963) (released as by The Coasters) - reissue of Joy LP.
- The Coasters (Stateside #40028) (Germany) (1973) (all 16 solo tracks recorded in 1962) (released as by The Coasters)
- Michelle Phillips: Victim Of Romance (A&M #4651) (1977) (backup vocals on "Paid The Price" track)
- Various Artists: Buttshakers Volume 2 (Mr. Luckee) (includes "Lookin' Like A Nut Nut")
