= Fred Sledge Smith =

- Also known as: Fred Smith
- Born: May 18, 1933; Los Angeles, California, US
- Died: July 29, 2005 (aged 72); Los Angeles
- Occupation(s): Songwriter, record producer
- Years active: Late 1950s–mid-1970s

Fred Sledge Smith (May 18, 1933 – July 29, 2005), often credited as Fred Smith, was an American R&B songwriter and record producer, who worked in particular with The Olympics, Bob & Earl, Bill Cosby, and the Watts 103rd Street Rhythm Band.

== Biography ==
Smith was born in Los Angeles, where his mother, Effie Smith, worked as a singer and comic entertainer. He started his career as a songwriter in the 1950s with his friend Cliff Goldsmith. They wrote the novelty song "Western Movies", which was recorded by vocal group The Olympics, who were managed by Smith's stepfather, John Criner. The song was released on the Demon record label, and rose to #8 on the Billboard Hot 100, and #7 on the R&B chart, in 1958.

Smith and Goldsmith continued to co-write novelty and dance songs together until the early 1960s. Their hits for the Olympics included "Hully Gully" (later reworked as "Peanut Butter" by the Marathons, for which Smith and Goldsmith also received the writing credit), "Shimmy Like Kate" (an adaptation of the 1920s song "I Wish I Could Shimmy Like My Sister Kate"), and "Dance By The Light of the Moon"; they also wrote "Patti Ann", a 1962 hit for Johnny Crawford. The song "Hully Gully" was later covered by many other artists, including Chubby Checker and The Beach Boys. Smith and Goldsmith also co-produced many of the Olympics' early records, with Smith taking over sole production responsibilities in about 1963.

In 1963, Smith started working for the Mirwood label, established in Los Angeles by former Vee-Jay executive Randy Wood. He began working with the duo Bob and Earl – Bob Relf and Earl Nelson – and, with Relf and Nelson, co-produced their record "Harlem Shuffle", arranged by Gene Page with input from Barry White. The record belatedly became a Top 10 hit in the UK several years later, and Smith also co-wrote and co-produced several of the duo's follow-up singles. In 1965, Smith co-wrote and produced "The Duck", credited to Jackie Lee, a pseudonym used by Earl Nelson. The record reached #14 on the US pop chart, and Smith continued to work with Nelson on later singles credited to Jackie Lee. Many of Smith's productions on Mirwood for acts such as Jimmy Thomas and the Mirettes, though no more than regionally successful at the time, became popular in British Northern soul clubs. He regularly worked with arranger James Carmichael. He also wrote and produced tracks on other small Los Angeles record labels including Arvee and Tri-Disc.

Smith set up his own label, MoSoul, in 1967, and co-wrote and produced the #33 R&B chart hit, "Grits 'n Cornbread", by local group the Soul Runners. The band also backed Bill Cosby on his successful album Silver Throat: Bill Cosby Sings. The album, which Smith produced, included the hit single "Little Ole Man (Uptight, Everything's Alright)" – a #4 hit on the US pop chart – and Cosby followed it up with the album Hooray for the Salvation Army Band, also produced by Smith. Smith renamed the backing band as the Watts 103rd Street Rhythm Band, and recorded them on another of his labels, Keymen. The band's first hit under their new name, "Spreadin' Honey", was again co-written and produced by Smith, and he continued to produce the band after they were signed by Warner Bros. Records; they later changed their name to Charles Wright & the Watts 103rd Street Rhythm Band.

In the early 1970s Smith worked briefly alongside his mother, Effie Smith, at Stax Records, but he became disillusioned with the music industry and left the entertainment business after Stax closed down in 1975. He died in Los Angeles in 2005, aged 72. The epitaph on his gravestone reads: "Never boring, always loved - he made America dance."
