= Baby Driver – Music from the Motion Picture =

2017 soundtrack album by various artists

Soundtrack album by various artists
- Released: June 23, 2017
- Length: 1:43:53
- Label: 30th Century

Baby Driver – Music from the Motion Picture is the soundtrack album to the 2017 film of the same name. The soundtrack was released on June 23, 2017, on CD, vinyl and digital music via the Columbia Records imprint, 30th Century Records. The album features a combination of artists, from various decades, including Blur, Run the Jewels, Sky Ferreira, Jon Spencer Blues Explosion, Queen, The Beach Boys, The Commodores, The Steve Miller Band, Focus, Simon & Garfunkel, and Golden Earring.

The film takes its name from "Baby Driver," a song from the Simon & Garfunkel album Bridge over Troubled Water. The song is played during the end credits. Edgar Wright, who wrote and directed the film, consulted James Gunn, who wrote and directed Guardians of the Galaxy Vol. 2, before the release of Vol. 2 and its soundtrack to ensure the two films did not feature the same songs on their soundtracks.

The soundtrack features three original tracks: a cover of the Commodores' "Easy" by Sky Ferreira; "Chase Me" by Danger Mouse (featuring Run the Jewels and Big Boi); and "Was He Slow?" by Kid Koala.

The soundtrack won the Empire Award for Best Soundtrack at the 23rd Empire Awards.

== Track listing ==
Disc one
No.	Title	Writer(s)	Artist(s)	Length
1.	"Bellbottoms"	Jon Spencer; Russell Simens; Judah Bauer	Jon Spencer Blues Explosion	5:17
2.	"Harlem Shuffle"	Bob Relf; Earl Nelson	Bob & Earl	2:52
3.	"Egyptian Reggae"	Jonathan Richman; Earl Zero	Jonathan Richman & The Modern Lovers	2:37
4.	"Smokey Joe's La La"	Rafael René	Googie René	3:02
5.	"Let's Go Away for Awhile"	Brian Wilson	The Beach Boys	2:21
6.	"B-A-B-Y"	Issac Hayes; David Porter	Carla Thomas	2:57
7.	"Kashmere"	Conrad O. Johnson	Kashmere Stage Band	4:57
8.	"Unsquare Dance"	Dave Brubeck	Dave Brubeck	2:00
9.	"Neat Neat Neat"	Brian James	The Damned	2:42
10.	"Easy" (single version)	Lionel Richie	The Commodores	4:16
11.	"Debora"	Marc Bolan	T. Rex	3:19
12.	"Debra"	Beck Hansen; Edward Green; John King; Michael Simpson	Beck	5:43
13.	"Bongolia"	Perry Botkin Jr.	Incredible Bongo Band	2:15
14.	"Baby Let Me Take You (In My Arms)"	Abrim Tilmon	The Detroit Emeralds	3:53
15.	"Early in the Morning"	Traditional; arranged by Alexis Korner	Alexis Korner	3:01

Disc two
No.	Title	Writer(s)	Artist(s)	Length
16.	"The Edge"	David Axelrod	David McCallum	2:54
17.	"Nowhere to Run"	Edward James Holland, Jr.; Lamont Dozier; Brian Holland	Martha and the Vandellas	3:02
18.	"Tequila"	Daniel "Chuck Rio" Flores	The Button Down Brass	3:32
19.	"When Something Is Wrong with My Baby"	Issac Hayes; David Porter	Sam & Dave	3:16
20.	"Every Little Bit Hurts"	Ed Cobb	Brenda Holloway	2:57
21.	"Intermission"	Damon Albarn; Alex James; Dave Rowntree; Graham Coxon	Blur	2:27
22.	"Hocus Pocus" (original single version)	Thijs van Leer; Jan Akkerman	Focus	3:18
23.	"Radar Love" (1973 single edit)	George Kooymans; Barry Hay	Golden Earring	3:44
24.	"Never, Never Gonna Give Ya Up"	Barry White	Barry White	4:51
25.	"Know How"	Issac Hayes; John King; Michael Simpson; Matt Dike; Marvin Young	Young MC	4:02
26.	"Brighton Rock"	Brian May	Queen	5:10
27.	"Easy"	Lionel Richie	Sky Ferreira	4:28
28.	"Baby Driver"	Paul Simon	Simon & Garfunkel	3:16
29.	"Was He Slow?" (credit roll version)	Kid Koala	Kid Koala featuring Kevin Spacey and Jon Bernthal	1:47

Bonus track
No.	Title	Writer(s)	Artist(s)	Length
30.	"Chase Me"	Danger Mouse; Big Boi; Killer Mike; EI-P; Jon Spencer	Danger Mouse featuring Run the Jewels and Big Boi	3:27

== Charts ==
=== Weekly charts ===
Chart (2017)	Peak position
Australian Albums (ARIA)	5
Austrian Albums (Ö3 Austria)	56
Belgian Albums (Ultratop Flanders)	48
Belgian Albums (Ultratop Wallonia)	64
Canadian Albums (Billboard)	40
Dutch Albums (Album Top 100)	66
French Albums (SNEP)	165
German Albums (Offizielle Top 100)	76
New Zealand Albums (RMNZ)	16
Spanish Albums (Promusicae)	52
Swiss Albums (Schweizer Hitparade)	54
UK Soundtrack Albums (Official Charts)	1
US Billboard 200	27
US Soundtrack Albums (Billboard)	4
US Top Alternative Albums (Billboard)	4
US Top Rock Albums (Billboard)	3

=== Year-end charts ===
Chart (2017)	Position
Australian Albums (ARIA)	84
US Soundtrack Albums (Billboard)	14
US Top Rock Albums (Billboard)	90

=== Certifications ===
Region	Certification	Certified units/sales
United Kingdom (BPI)	Silver	60,000^{‡}
^{‡} Sales+streaming figures based on certification alone.

== Lawsuit ==
In August 2017, Rolan Feld, son of T. Rex lead vocalist and songwriter Marc Bolan, sued Sony Pictures, Media Rights Capital, and Bambino Films for using the band's song "Debora" without permission. Both parties reportedly settled during a mediation on January 12, 2018.

== Baby Driver Volume 2: The Score For a Score ==
Baby Driver Volume 2: The Score For a Score

Soundtrack album by various artists
- Released: April 13, 2018
- Label: 30th Century

A sequel to the soundtrack was released April 13, 2018, entitled Baby Driver Volume 2: The Score For a Score. It features several exclusive tracks, remixes, and film dialogue including cuts from Steven Price's previously unreleased score.

Side A
No.	Title	Writer(s)	Artist(s)	Length
1.	"Robbery Arrival"	Steven Price	Steven Price	0:43
2.	"Chase Me"	Danger Mouse; Big Boi; Killer Mike; EI-P; Jon Spencer	Danger Mouse featuring Run the Jewels and Big Boi	3:26
3.	"Secondo Intermezzino Pop"	Ennio Morricone	Ennio Morricone	0:48
4.	"Candy From Baby / What’s In There Is Ours"	Steven Price	Steven Price	1:42
5.	"Harlem Shuffle"	Bob Relf; Earl Nelson	The Foundations	2:02
6.	"Sunset That Ride"	Steven Price	Steven Price	1:08
7.	"You’re Back!"	Edgar Wright	Lily James & Ansel Elgort	0:12
8.	"Baby I'm Yours"	Van McCoy	Barbara Lewis	2:27
9.	"Cry Baby Cry"	John Lennon; Paul McCartney	Unloved	3:58
10.	"Keep Driving and Never Stop"	Steven Price	Steven Price	0:43
11.	"Threshold"	Steven Haworth Miller; Byron Allred	Steve Miller Band	1:02
12.	"Nowhere to Run" (Baby Driver Mix)	Edward James Holland, Jr.; Lamont Dozier; Brian Holland	Boga	2:26
13.	"TaKillYa" (Baby Driver Mix)	Daniel "Chuck Rio" Flores	Vinnie Maniscalco	3:36

Side B
No.	Title	Writer(s)	Artist(s)	Length
14.	"Run the Jewels"	Killer Mike; EI-P; Torbitt Schwartz	Run the Jewels	3:40
15.	"Bananas"	Steven Price	Steven Price	1:32
16.	"Ready Lets Go"	Michael Sandison; Marcus Eoin	Boards of Canada	0:54
17.	"Dumb-Ass Excuse"	Steven Price	Steven Price	0:21
18.	"Debora"	Marc Bolan	Kid Koala	1:33
19.	"What did you do?"	Edgar Wright	Jon Hamm & Ansel Elgort	0:05
20.	"Hocus Pocus (Baby Driver Mix)"	Thijs van Leer; Jan Akkerman	Focus	2:39
21.	"My Name Is Joseph"	Edgar Wright	Ansel Elgort	0:28
22.	"New Orleans Instrumental No. 1"	Michael Stipe; Bill Berry; Mike Mills; Peter Buck	R.E.M.	2:05
23.	"Lucky Charm"	Steven Pridce	Steven Price	1:51
24.	"Run"	Steven Price	Steven Price	1:36
25.	"Easy" (Baby Driver Mix)	Lionel Richie	Sky Ferreira	3:49
26.	"Postcards from Debora"	Steven Price	Steven Price	0:54
27.	"Killer Track"	Edgar Wright	Jon Hamm & Ansel Elgort	0:10
28.	"Blue Song"	Christopher Baker; Neil Claxton	Mint Royale	3:25
Total length:				49:15
