= Simon Soussan =

Simon Soussan is a British record producer of French-Moroccan descent.

== UK distributor for Northern soul ==
He first became known in the UK due to selling Northern soul singles to collectors, both original copies and bootleg copies from his base in Leeds. He also produced versions of Northern soul tracks, released on his Soul Fox Records and Soul Galore labels. He produced some new tracks which were released under established names without the actual artist's involvement, such as Lorraine Chandler on his Black Magic record label.

Soussan was involved with the amazing story of how Frank Wilson's "Do I Love You (Deed I Do)" became the most expensive Northern soul 7" ever sold. He befriended Tom DePierro at Motown Records, who had discovered one of the only two copies of the single in existence. According to Frank Wilson, the rest were destroyed after Berry Gordy gave him the choice of being an artist or a producer. Soussan borrowed the copy from DePierro and bootlegged it before selling it to Les McCutcheon, future manager of the band Shakatak. The bootleg was slightly sped up and released under the name Eddie Foster, and that version became a Wigan Casino classic. The original copies of the single have since gone on to sell for £15,000 and £25,000.

== Harem, Harthon and Mirwood Records ==
Relocating to Los Angeles in the mid-1970s, Soussan spent hours on end in many record shops seeking those with the right sound for Northern soul. One such shop was LoCo Records which was owned by Lonnie Cook. Soussan soon learned that Cook was the same person that wrote, "I Thought You Were Mine". That record is now #242 in the top 500 Northern soul. Soussan also assumed Lonnie Cook to be the lead vocalist on the Arpeggio album but it was not to be, for on the day of the first session, Cook had laryngitis for the first time in his life. That being so Cook sent the first tenor of his reforming Fandangos doo wop group in his stead, Sam Strain (Imperials/O'Jays).

Round about 1973, he turned up on the doorstep of Mirwood Records (and Mira Records and former ex Vee Jay Records manager) owner Randy Wood. Wood was in poor health with large medical bills to pay, and Soussan wanted to buy the label. Sources report Wood as opening his garage door and telling Soussan to take what he wanted. Soussan allegedly took everything for an undisclosed sum of money. In the 1990s, he gave Goldmine/Soul Supply Records exclusive distributors rights to the music. However, in the 2010s, Ace Records bought the rights to Mirwood/Mira from Wood's ex business partner and Vee Jay Records owner Betty Chiapetta and currently own the label. Soussan set up a record-exporting business in collaboration with Selectadisc in Nottingham. Soon he began to produce artists during the disco era of the 1980s. He produced Shalamar, Patti Brooks, Santa Esmeralda, Jessica Williams with Arpeggio and the electro group French Kiss, Romance, Charisma, Nicole Stone, Spice of Life, as well as recording with his namesake Simon Orchestra. Soussan scored hits with Jessica Williams "Queen of Fools", and Arpeggio "Love and Desire". While French Kiss had a hit with "Panic". He also bought 1960s production company Harthon Productions, which leased its recordings to several major labels. Soussan founded Harem Records, devoted to disco music and also to license the 1960s master recordings he now owned, which entered a joint venture in 1985 with Bluebonnet Records, and a US distribution agreement with RCA Records.
