= Songs of Protest and Anti-Protest =

Studio album by Chris Lucey
- Released: 1965
- Recorded: 1965
- Genre: Psychedelic folk; psychedelic pop
- Length: 38:59
- Label: Surrey
- Producer: Randy Wood, Marshall Leib

Chris Lucey chronology
Songs of Protest and Anti-Protest (1965)	Color Him In (1967)

Songs of Protest and Anti-Protest (released in the United Kingdom as Too Many Mornings) is the debut album by American singer-songwriter Bobby Jameson, credited under the name Chris Lucey. It was released on Surrey Records in 1965. Recorded on a limited budget, the album did not receive much attention at the time of its release; however, over time it has become treasured for its resemblance to the arrangements found in Love's album Forever Changes. Songs of Protest and Anti-Protest has since been reissued and made more accessible to collectors.

== Background ==
The album was originally a project between Surrey Records, and singer-songwriter Chris Ducey. Ten songs were recorded for the album; however, the record label ran into contractual complications when it was discovered Ducey had commitments to ABC Records. Without a deal to release Songs of Protest and Anti-Protest, record producers Randy Wood and Betty Chiapetta had intent to find a new musician to record another set of original material. They discovered Bobby Jameson, a folkie who recorded the Mick Jagger-Keith Richards composition "All I Want Is My Baby" during a venture to England, in 1965. Because the record sleeves had already been printed for Chris Ducey's album, Wood and Chiapetta required Jameson to write new songs using the same song titles as Ducey's recordings, and had the sleeves overprinted so that the word Ducey would appear as Lucey. While discussing the events leading to the album, Jameson recalled he "was twenty years old, flat broke, and unrepresented by counsel or management". Wood used this to his advantage: Jameson would receive no royalties for any sales and was credited as Chris Lucey without any mutual understanding.

== Style ==
With producer Marshall Leib—previously an associate of Phil Spector—Jameson explored intricate arrangements and somewhat bleak lyricism, which is commonly compared to the sophisticated orchestration found in the psychedelic rock band Love's Forever Changes (1967). Like the group's frontman Arthur Lee, Jameson could transform a simple lyric into a wistful turn-of-phrase.

== Legacy ==
Released in 1965, the album was issued as Songs of Protest and Anti-Protest in the United States, and as Too Many Mornings in Europe. Its cover photo showed Rolling Stones member Brian Jones, according to Jameson "because a lot of people just plain liked the photo, particularly the people in Europe who were involved in the Surrey deal."

Although the album did not receive much attention at the time of its release, it is now one of the most prized pieces of the era. Analyzing Songs of Protest and Anti-Protest, critic Dean McFarlane wrote that it is the "culminating collaged arrangements and schizophrenia that gives this record its wayward charm". According to critic Dave Furgess, "All in all this is a very satisfying and well performed disc which has Chris Lucey wearing his influences proudly on his sleeve. But don't get me wrong he is far from being a copycat, he really has a unique sound that's all his own. In fact I'm knocked out by what a versatile singer and writer he is". In 2002, Rev-Ola Records reissued the album on compact disc.

== Track listing ==
Side one

1. "That's the Way This World Has Got to Be (I)" – 3:08
2. "I'll Remember Them" – 3:15
3. "Girl from Vernon MT" – 3:07
4. "I Got the Blues" – 2:25
5. "Saline" – 1:40

Side two

6. "That's the Way This World Has Got to Be (II)" – 2:58
7. "With Pity But It's Too Late" – 2:47
8. "You Came You Saw, But You Didn't Conquer Me" – 1:38
9. "Girl from the East" – 3:50
10. "Don't Come Looking" – 2:30
