= Inside Pop: The Rock Revolution =

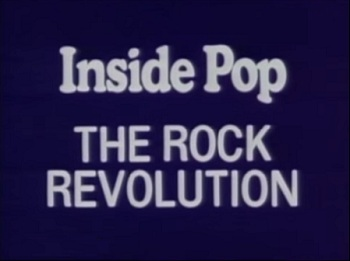
- Title card
- Directed by: David Oppenheim
- Written by: Leonard Bernstein, David Oppenheim
- Produced by: Pat Jaffe, David Oppenheim
- Starring: Leonard Bernstein
- Release date: 25 April 1967 (CBS)
- Running time: 60 mins

Inside Pop: The Rock Revolution is a 1967 American television documentary by David Oppenheim about young pop and rock musicians producing music as "a symptom and generator" of social unrest and generation gaps. Hosted by Leonard Bernstein, it was commissioned by CBS and broadcast on April 25, 1967. Musicians who appeared in the documentary included singer-songwriter Janis Ian, who performed her song "Society's Child", and Beach Boys leader Brian Wilson, who performed his song "Surf's Up".

Inside Pop followed other TV programs dedicated to contemporary rock, such as a 1966 ABC News special titled Anatomy of Pop, but Oppenheim's documentary represented the first time that pop music had been presented on television as a genuine art form. This acknowledgement coincided with a newfound appreciation, by cultural commentators and scholars, of the advances that the Beatles and other contemporary artists had made during the 1960s.

== Background ==
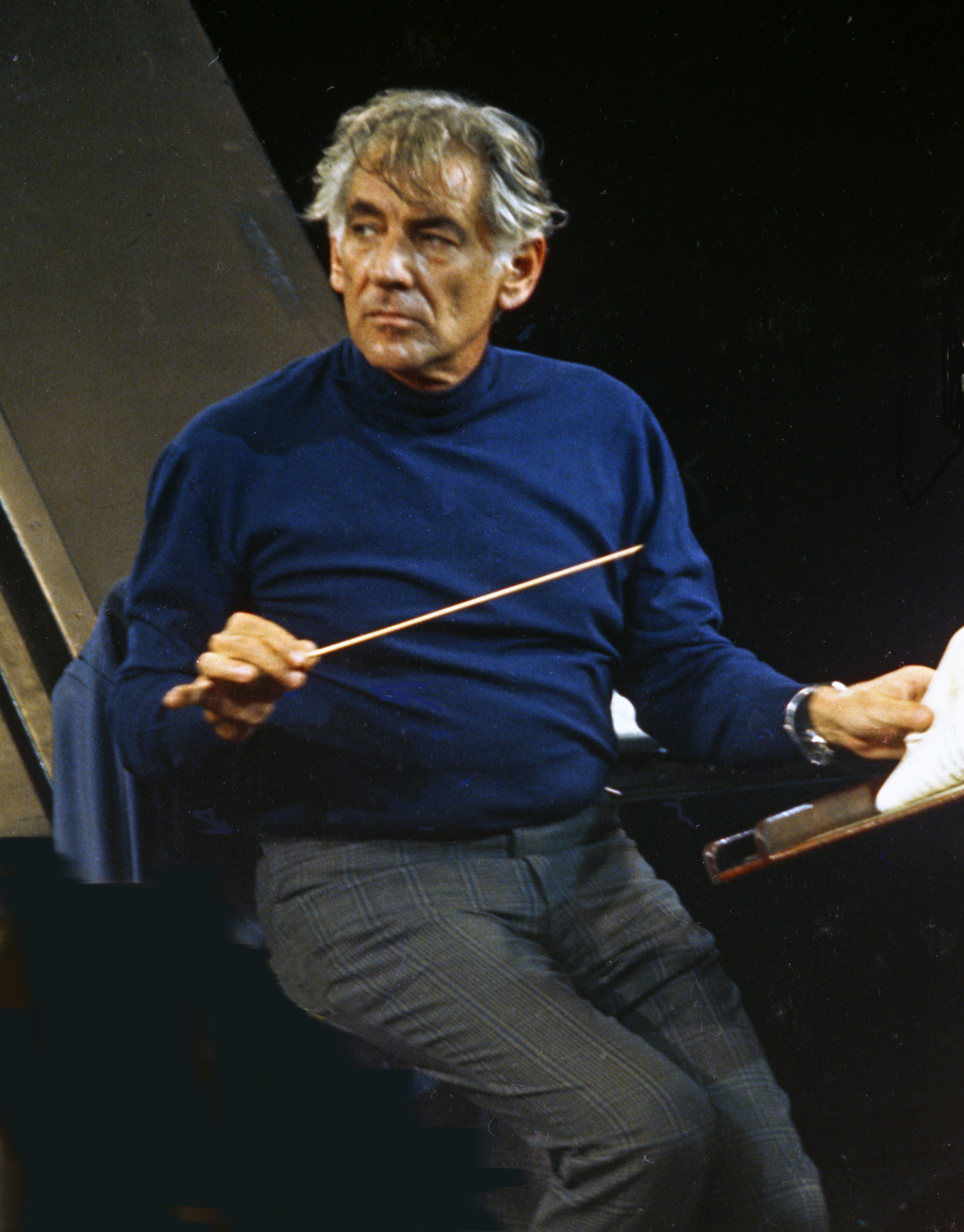
Inside Pop host Leonard Bernstein

Bernstein, a classical composer and the director of the New York Philharmonic, was among the first American classical musicians to publicly recognize the artistic worth of the new wave of rock music led by the Beatles. The status he held among conservative and middle-aged viewers allowed him to bridge the age and philosophical divide that separated them from the youth-centered message of this new music. During the show, he described himself as "fascinated by the strange and compelling scene called 'pop music'" and said that, while the majority of it was "trash", the remainder was "so exciting and vital … it claims the attention of every thinking person". Bernstein also suggested that, while many parents might banish contemporary pop music from the family home, "I think this music has something terribly important to tell us adults."

According to Beach Boys biographer David Leaf, Inside Pop was originally intended to be a documentary focused on the Beach Boys' leader Brian Wilson, who was then in the midst of recording the album Smile. Oppenheim told Beach Boys biographer Steven Gaines: "Some person in New York was very high on Brian Wilson. I was very curious about him and his music." (Note: Band publicist Derek Taylor arranged for Wilson to appear in the film.) He said that when he entered Wilson's Laurel Way home, "Brian was looking at the TV set with the volume off and just the color, detuned, and lots of vegetables around. ... It was a strange, insulated household, insulated from the world by money....A playpen of irresponsible people."

An interview with Wilson was attempted, but Oppenheim said the filmmakers were unable to "get much out of him" and was told by one of Wilson's "odd" associates that "he's not verbal". Other discarded sequences featured Wilson at his swimming pool and recording alone and with his group at a Hollywood studio. (Note: Filmed on December 15, the session was dedicated to the songs "Surf's Up" and "Wonderful". Wilson and Oppenheim were dissatisfied with the footage, and decided to reshoot the "Surf's Up" sequence at Wilson's home on December 17. His performance that day, executed in one take with a candelabrum placed on his grand piano, was captured by three film cameras and deemed satisfactory for use in the documentary.) Leaf wrote that it was later decided to expand the scope of the program due to the band's waning popularity in early 1967. There were ultimately no references to Smile in the film.

== Program contents ==
=== Part I ===
Inside Pop opens with an interview between Bernstein and songwriter Tandyn Almer. (Note: Almer wrote "Along Comes Mary" for the Association, which was a top 10 hit on the Billboard charts in 1966.) Bernstein then discusses the Beatles' contribution to modern songwriting, in terms of the unexpected key and tempo changes found in their songs "Good Day Sunshine" and "She Said She Said". He admires the range of musical moods evoked in contemporary pop, citing the Beatles' "Penny Lane", "Eleanor Rigby" and "Love You To" for, respectively, their trumpet solo, orchestral strings and Indian raga qualities, and the Rolling Stones' "Paint It Black" for its "arab café" mood. Seated at a piano throughout, he compares some of the Beatles' most adventurous efforts to works by classical composers Bach and Schumann; he lauds Bob Dylan's lyrics as befitting "a bombshell of a book about social criticism". Bernstein says that the poetic and subtle nature of contemporary pop lyric writing represents "one of our teenagers' strongest weapons", since: "Protected by this armor of poetry, our young lyricists can say just about anything they care to, and they do care." He also expresses admiration for the Left Banke's "Pretty Ballerina" and its use of both Lydian and Mixolydian modes, and for the Monkees' "I'm a Believer". Other artists mentioned include the Byrds, the Association and Tim Buckley.

For the end of part one, Bernstein invited teenage folk singer Janis Ian to perform "Society's Child", which she wrote about the then controversial issue of interracial romance. Due to its subject matter, the song had been banned by many radio stations.

=== Part II ===
The second part of the special includes footage filmed by Oppenheim in November 1966 of civil unrest in Los Angeles. Young people are shown protesting the police's enforcement of a curfew designed to limit their presence around Sunset Strip. Also shown are studio interviews with Los Angeles-based musicians Frank Zappa, Roger McGuinn of the Byrds, members of the bands Canned Heat, the Unidentified Flying Objects, Gentle Soul, and Los Angeles Free Press reporter Paul Robbins. All the interviewees expound on the power of music to effect change in the world. Zappa warns of an imminent "revolution", adding: "it's going to be a sloppy one, unless something is done to get it organized in a hurry." (Note: Decades later, Zappa reflected that after the 1960s, record executives were succeeded by their "far more conservative -- and more dangerous" hippie employees. He explained that "the old guys ... were willing to take a chance on an [unusual or experimental] idea, even if [they didn't] like or understand it. The new guys don't have that spirit.")

Singer-songwriter Bobby Jameson momentarily appears as a protester in the film, albeit uncredited. (Note: Jameson was featured as a subject in the documentary film Mondo Hollywood, released in the same year. At the time, he was in a relationship with Gail Sloatman (later the wife of Zappa) who characterized him as "somebody who was desperately seeking to be famous or die.") Herman's Hermits also appear, as does Graham Nash of the Hollies. (Note: Nash was not yet part of the supergroup Crosby, Stills, Nash, & Young.) One of the program's final scenes is a film of Brian Wilson, on solo piano and vocals, premiering the original song "Surf's Up". (Note: The song had yet to be released at the time.) In the narration accompanying his performance, Oppenheim remarks that the song holds too much to comprehend on an initial listen, and attributes a profound and elusive quality to the composition.

== Legacy ==
Inside Pop: The Rock Revolution premiered on the CBS network, on April 25, 1967, and represented the first time that pop music had been presented on television as a genuine art form. Through Bernstein's support and her appearance on Inside Pop, Ian's "Society's Child" became a top 20 hit in the United States. According to journalist Nick Kent, when Wilson viewed the finished documentary, he was disturbed by the praises he was afforded, thereby accelerating the collapse of the Smile album. After Inside Pop, Almer spent some time as a staff songwriter for A&M Records and collaborated on a number of songs with Wilson.

== Cast ==
Listed by order of first appearance:

- Leonard Bernstein
- Tandyn Almer
- Peter Noone (as "Herman of Herman's Hermits")
- Pam Polland
- Brian Wilson
- Graham Nash
- Frank Zappa
- Janis Ian
- Roger McGuinn (as "Jim McGuinn")
- Tim Buckley
- David Oppenheim
- John Hartmann (Note: Identified through subtitle as a "manager.)
- Frank Cook
- Ann Sternberg
- Diane Tribuno
- Lisa Kindred
- Paul Jay Robbins
- Lorry Stanton
- Bobby Jameson
- Graham Gouldman
- Rick Stanley

== See also ==
Related social and historical topics

- 1966 and 1967 in music
- Acid rock
- Counterculture of the 1960s
- Freak scene
- Hippie
- Protest song
- Youth activism

Related contemporary works by the featured musicians

- Absolutely Free (The Mothers of Invention, 1967)
- Canned Heat (Canned Heat, 1967)
- "Eight Miles High" (The Byrds, 1966)
- Evolution (The Hollies, 1967)
- Freak Out! (The Mothers of Invention, 1966)
- "I Know There's an Answer" (The Beach Boys, 1966)
- The Notorious Byrd Brothers (The Byrds, 1968)
- Tim Buckley (Tim Buckley, 1966)
- We're Only in It for the Money (The Mothers of Invention, 1968)
- Younger Than Yesterday (The Byrds, 1967)
