= Effie Smith =

American singer

- Also known as: Effie Smith Criner
- Born: Effie Mae Bly; April 10, 1914; McAlester, Oklahoma, United States
- Died: February 11, 1977 (aged 62) Los Angeles, California
- Genres: Jazz, R&B
- Occupations: Singer, comedian
- Years active: 1930s–late 1970s

Effie Smith (born Effie Mae Blu or Bly, April 10, 1914 – February 11, 1977) was an American blues and jazz singer and comedian, best known for "Dial That Telephone", a song she first recorded in 1953 which became an R&B hit in 1965.

She was born in McAlester, Oklahoma, and after an early marriage took the surname of her husband, Fred Smith. By 1940 she was living in Los Angeles, California, with her two children, and was working as a singer in a WPA project. She sang in a vocal group, the Three Shades of Rhythm, and with the Lionel Hampton and Benny Carter orchestras, and during World War II appeared on several Armed Forces Radio Service broadcasts including sessions with saxophonist Coleman Hawkins and 16-year-old pianist André Previn.

She married comedian, songwriter and record producer John Laurence Criner (1914–1992), and recorded several songs with Johnny Otis for the G&G and Gem labels, both parts of Criner's Royal Records group. She also recorded for Miltone Records in 1947, one of her songs being an answer record to label owner Roy Milton's own "R.M. Blues". During the 1950s, she recorded a number of tracks for Aladdin Records, including in 1953 the first version of "Dial That Telephone", a comedic monologue in which she complains to a friend about the absence of her husband. She also recorded with Ike Carpenter's orchestra. In 1955 and 1956, she recorded several tracks including "Champagne Mind with a Soda Water Income" with the Squires, a vocal group featuring Don Harris and Dewey Terry (later Don and Dewey). She recorded several versions of "Dial That Telephone" over the years, including a 1959 version released on Criner's Spot record label. However, the song only became a chart success in 1965, when a new recording on the Duo Disc label reached No. 36 on the Billboard R&B chart. In 1968, her recording of "Harper Valley P.T.A. Gossip", a spoken elaboration of the content of Jeannie C. Riley's hit "Harper Valley PTA", reached No. 43 on the R&B chart.

Smith later worked in record promotion and A&R for Stax Records. She died from cancer in Los Angeles in 1977, aged 62.

A compilation of her recordings between 1945 and 1953 was issued by the Chronological Classics label in the 1990s. One of her children, Fred Sledge Smith (1933–2005), became a prominent songwriter and record producer in the 1950s and 1960s, with artists including The Olympics, Bob & Earl, and Bill Cosby.
