= Hully Gully (song) =

Song sung by The Olympics

"(Baby) Hully Gully"

Song by The Olympics

from the album Doin' the Hully Gully
- B-side: "Private Eye"
- Released: July 1959
- Genre: Doo-wop
- Length: 2:03
- Label: Arvee
- Composer(s): Fred Sledge Smith, Cliff Goldsmith

"(Baby) Hully Gully" is a song written by Fred Sledge Smith and Cliff Goldsmith and recorded by The Olympics. Released in 1959, it peaked at number 72 on the Billboard Hot 100 in February 1960 and sparked the Hully Gully dance craze.

According to recollections by the Beatles about their early 1960 and '61 touring years, both in Hamburg and Liverpool the song had also gained a certain notoriety as a popular accompaniment to brawls among the audience, with fights often breaking out as soon as the song started being played.

== Cover versions ==
"Hully Gully"

Song by The Beach Boys

from the album Beach Boys' Party!
- Released: 8 November 1965
- Genre: Rock and roll
- Length: 2:22
- Label: Capitol
- Composer(s): Fred Sledge Smith, Cliff Goldsmith
- Producer(s): Brian Wilson

"(Baby) Hully Gully" was covered by a number of different artists, sometimes under the name "Hully Gully (Baby)", "Hully Gully Baby" or simply "Hully Gully".

- Buddy Guy, Stone Crazy! 1960–1967 (recorded 1960)
- Chubby Checker, It's Pony Time (1961)
- The Ventures, Mashed Potatoes and Gravy (1962)
- The Dovells, single (1962)
- Cliff Bennett and the Rebel Rousers (1962) (appears on some bootlegs miscredited as The Beatles)
- The Searchers, At the Star Club
- The Beach Boys, Beach Boys' Party! (1965)
- Jackie Lee, The Duck (1966)
- Hollywood Argyles, single (1960)
- Mike Bloomfield, Junko Partner and Prescription for the Blues (recorded 1977)
- Grateful Dead (Amsterdam, 10-16-1981)
- The A-Bones, Music Minus Five (1993)
- Petr Kotvald, Právě tady...Právě teď (2011)

The song was covered, with new lyrics by H. B. Barnum and Marty Cooper, under the name of "Peanut Butter" by:

- The Marathons (The Vibrations) (1961)
- The Royal Guardsmen (1966)
- J. Geils Band (1976)
- Billy Vera and the Beaters (1987)
- Mary Kate & Ashley Olsen (1992)
- The Wiggles (2013)

The song was adapted as a commercial jingle for Peter Pan peanut butter in the 1980s.
