= Killer Joe Piro =

American dance instructor

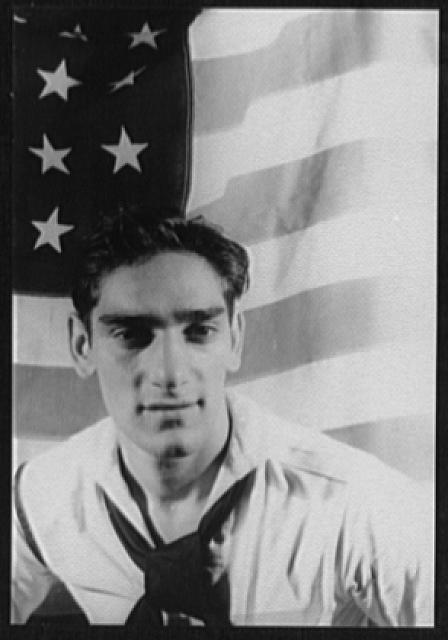
Frank Piro in 1942

Frank "Killer Joe" Piro (2 March 1921 – 5 February 1989) was an American dance instructor to high society who popularized steps of the discotheque era of the 1960s and 1970s.

== Early life ==
Piro was born in East Harlem, the son of an Italian tailor. He described himself as 'skinny and ugly', and, to meet girls, began dancing. Piro got hooked on dance by frequenting the Savoy Ballroom in Harlem in his late teens.

He won his moniker at the dance contests that were a big feature of the New York City scene in the 1940s. The "Killer Joe" nickname comes from a supposed ability to wear out one partner after the other on the dance floor. It has been suggested that John Travolta's role in Saturday Night Fever (1977) owes more than a little to Piro.

While serving with the United States Navy in World War II, he won a National Jitterbug contest held at the 1942 Harvest Moon Ball, and earned a transfer to Broadway's equivalent of the Hollywood Canteen, where he strutted his stuff with Katharine Cornell and other stage stars.

== Dance instructor ==
After the war, Piro started winning dance contests at the Palladium Ballroom in Manhattan with such frequency that he said they offered him $15 a week to be a teacher and stay out of the contests. There he recruited as his co-instructor Carmen Marie Padilla, who was also a singer and later became the poet Carmen M. Pursifull; he called their team "Killer Joe and Carmen". Piro moved on to serve as master of ceremonies at the Palladium, into which thousands of dancers would pack each night. He would offer mass lessons in whatever step was the rage, and take on all comers willing to challenge his status as the undisputed master.

The Palladium proclaimed itself the "temple of mambo" and Hollywood inevitably capitalized on the craze. Piro can be seen doing the mambo to the music of Tito Rodriguez on the 1950 Universal short subject, "Mambo Madness".

In the early fifties, he opened his own studio on 54 West 55th Street in Manhattan, where many in New York's high society came to take dance lessons. Invariably keeping a step ahead of trends, over the decades he taught what would become the mainstays of the discothèque scene: the Mambo, the Cha-cha and the Merengue, then the Twist and later the Frug, the Frog, the Watusi, and the Hully Gully.

His students included the Duke of Windsor, Sita Devi Gaekwar - Maharani of Baroda, Dame Margot Fonteyn, Ray Bolger, Luci Baines Johnson, Jacqueline Kennedy Onassis and, by 1965, more than a million other Americans, according to an obituary in The New York Times.

His fame somehow spread far enough to be photographed by Richard Avedon and to inspire a Filipino guitar band, The Rocky Fellers, to record a tribute tune, "Killer Joe", for Scepter Records in 1963. The record earned the band a spot on the Top 40 pop charts for a few weeks.

Piro was a guest on the February 16, 1965, edition of the satirical NBC-TV program, That Was The Week That Was, where he and the show's singer, Nancy Ames, demonstrated some of the latest dance steps.

Despite being the undisputed "King of the Discotheque", Piro never opened his own club. Asked why, he replied, "I like things the way they are. I don't want to be watching a cash register, watching the waiters - it would take all the beauty of dancing away from me and I would get old."

== Discotheque albums ==
By the mid-sixties, American imitations of European discothèques—clubs where the patrons danced to records spun by a disk jockey instead of a live band—were starting to catch on, and with these clubs, the demand for new dance steps skyrocketed. Record labels feverishly rushed out whole albums of music to the Monkey or Limbo by, or else mimicked the discothèque effect by assembling compilations of everything from the Foxtrot to the Boogaloo. Piro was invited to pose for the cover of discothèque albums Discotheque! (Enoch Light), The Mule (Skitch Henderson), and Viva La Pachanga (Joe Sherman).

In 1965, Piro released his own dance album entitled "Killer Joe's International Discotheque". The LP served as an instructional dance record and repackaged hits by Ray Charles, The Clovers, and other mainstays of Atlantic's R&B back catalog. The album promised it was as "the first authentic discotheque album by the King of the Discotheque," and was supervised by Atlantic Records producers Jerry Wexler and Nesuhi Ertegun, brother of Ahmet Ertegun. The session musicians included King Curtis, Tate Houston, Cornell Dupree, Eric Gale and Chuck Rainey.

The record features music to accompany the Watusi, the Monkey, the Swim, the Bossa Nova, the Merengue, the Jerk, the cha-cha Watusi, the Hully Gully, the Mlle, the Frug, and the Shake, among others. Songs include "The Girl from Ipanema", "What'd I Say?", "Twist and Shout" and "Hang On Sloopy" as well as the main theme, "Killer Joe", by The Rocky Fellers. The album exhorts, "There is a great deal of fun waiting for you, so don't waste a moment, hear this album, and have yourself a discotheque."

== Later life ==
Piro was featured in a 1960s print advertisement for Mobil. The advertisement described the dangers of driving while tense, showing an image of Piro's face that was edited to make him look scarier.

In 1965, Smirnoff Vodka hired Piro to create a new dance called the Mule for the Moscow mule (at the time the "Smirnoff mule"). Piro and his partner appeared in an advertisement for the drink. In 1967, Piro served as choreographer for the stop-motion film Mad Monster Party? (1967). During the 1970s and early 1980s, although no longer the mega-celebrity he once was, he still remained a much-respected regular at various New York discos and was also on the board for the New York Friars' Club. He died of kidney disease at Lenox Hill Hospital at the age of 67, just shy of his 68th birthday.
