= Walter Ward (singer) =

American singer (1940–2006)

Walter Ward (August 28, 1940 – December 11, 2006) was an American R&B singer, and lead vocalist of The Olympics.

Ward was born in Jackson, Mississippi, and began singing professionally as a child with his father and three uncles, in a gospel group known as 'The Ward Brothers'.

Ward's family moved to Los Angeles in the 1950s. In 1954, when he was attending Centinela High School in Compton, California, Ward and his cousin Eddie Lewis formed a group known as 'The Challengers'. After winning a number of talent shows, Ward and Lewis were approached by another singing duo who asked to join their group. The new quartet became The Olympics.

Ward's last performance with The Olympics was on November 12, 2006, at a Doo-Wop Spectacular on Long Island, New York.

Ward died in Northridge, California in December 2006, at the age of 66.

== John Lennon cover ==
Ward's song "Well (Baby Please Don't Go)" (the b-side to The Olympics' "Western Movies") was recorded twice by John Lennon in 1971: the February 1971 studio recording was not issued until the 1998 John Lennon Anthology, then on Wonsaponatime and in 2018 on the Imagine reissue. The June 1971 live recording with Frank Zappa was issued on 1972's Some Time in New York City, and on 1992's Playground Psychotics. Lennon tells the audience that it was a song he used to do at the Cavern in Liverpool.
