= The Duck (song) =

Single by Jackie Lee

from the album The Duck
- B-side: "Let Your Conscience Be Your Guide"
- Released: November 1965
- Genre: Soul
- Length: 2:20
- Label: Mirwood
- Songwriters: Fred Sledge Smith, Earl Nelson
- Producer: Fred Sledge Smith

Jackie Lee singles chronology
"The Duck" (1965)	"Your P-E-R-S-O-N-A-L-I-T-Y" (1966)

"The Duck" is a song written by Fred Sledge Smith and Earl Nelson and performed by Jackie Lee. It was featured on his 1966 album The Duck. The song was arranged by Fred Hill and produced by Fred Sledge Smith.

== Chart performance ==
It reached No. 4 on the U.S. R&B chart and No. 14 on the U.S. pop chart in 1966. On the New Zealand listener chart it reached #15.

== Other versions ==
- Bobby Freeman released a version of the song as a single in 1965, but it did not chart.
- Sandy Nelson released a version of the song on his 1966 album "In" Beat.
- The Olympics released a version of the song on their 1966 album Something Old, Something New.
- Billy Preston released a version of the song on his 1966 album Wildest Organ in Town!
