= Wildest Organ in Town! =

Studio album by Billy Preston
- Released: June 1966
- Recorded: September 11, 1965
- Genre: Soul
- Length: 29:20
- Label: Capitol
- Producer: Steve Douglas

Billy Preston chronology
Early Hits of 1965 (1965)	Wildest Organ in Town! (1966)	Club Meeting (1967)

Wildest Organ in Town! is an album by Billy Preston. Released in 1966, it was arranged by Sly Stone.

The album peaked at No. 118 on the Billboard 200.

== Critical reception ==
Professional ratings
Review scores
Source	Rating
AllMusic	3/5 stars
The Encyclopedia of Popular Music	3/5 stars
The New Rolling Stone Record Guide	3/5 stars

AllMusic wrote that Preston's "early prowess as a flashy organ equivalent of Jimi Hendrix has been largely forgotten or overlooked, and the fact that this album hasn't been in print for many years hasn't helped."

== Track listing ==
1. "Midnight Hour" (Wilson Pickett, Steve Cropper) - 2:11
2. "Uptight" (Sylvia Moy, Stevie Wonder, Henry Cosby) - 2:22
3. "A Hard Day's Night" (John Lennon, Paul McCartney) - 2:53
4. "Ain't Got No Time to Play" (Billy Preston) - 2:02
5. "Love (Makes Me Do Foolish Things)" (Holland-Dozier-Holland) - 2:29
6. "The Duck" (Fred Smith, Earl Nelson) - 2:06
7. "Advice" (Preston, Sly Stone) - 2:25
8. "Satisfaction" (Mick Jagger, Keith Richards) - 2:40
9. "I Got You" (James Brown) - 2:29
10. "It's Got to Happen" (Preston, Stone) - 2:09
11. "Free Funk" (Preston, Stone) - 2:40
12. "The 'In' Crowd" (Billy Page) - 2:22
