= Hey Joe (album) =

Studio album by The Leaves
- Released: 1966
- Recorded: 1966
- Genre: Garage rock
- Length: 32:27
- Label: Mira

The Leaves chronology
Hey Joe (1966)	All the Good That's Happening (1967)

Professional ratings
Review scores
Source	Rating
AllMusic	3/5 stars

Hey Joe is the debut album by the Los Angeles-based band The Leaves, recorded and released in 1966. It is best known for the title track, which the group initially recorded and released as a single (Mira 207) in late 1965. Not satisfied with the sound, the group recorded a second version in early 1966. After Bobby Arlin replaced original guitarist Bill Rinehart, the group recorded and released a third version as a single (Mira 222) in May 1966. This is the widely-recognized version of the song.

The Leaves recording of "Hey Joe" was the first version of the song to have mainstream success. The song gained further notoriety when the Jimi Hendrix Experience recorded it as their first single in the fall of 1966. The Leaves' version was also part of the 1972 compilation album Nuggets: Original Artyfacts from the First Psychedelic Era, 1965–1968.

The original album was issued in both mono and stereo. It was reissued on CD, first in 1993 on One Way Records (with five bonus tracks) and again in 2000 on the Sundazed label (with seven bonus tracks).

The "Hey Joe" single (Mira 222) lists Dino Valenti as the composer, while the LP label credits Chester Powers (Valenti's given name).

== Track listing ==
=== Side 1 ===
1. "Dr. Stone" (Beck, Pons) - 2:20
2. "Just A Memory" (Arlin) - 2:17
3. "Get Out of My Life, Woman" (Allen Toussaint) - 2:45
4. "Girl From The East" (R.P. Jameson) - 2:56
5. "He Was a Friend of Mine" (Traditional) - 3:23
6. "Hey Joe" (Billy Roberts, credited to Dino Valenti or Chester Powers) - 2:48

=== Side 2 ===
1. "Words" (Tommy Boyce, Bobby Hart) - 2:31
2. "Back on the Avenue" (Pons, Beck, Ray, Arlin, Reiner) - 3:05
3. "War of Distortion" (Arlin) - 2:48
4. "Tobacco Road" (John D. Loudermilk) - 2:09
5. "Goodbye, My Lover" (C. Pender, A. McNally) - 3:10
6. "Too Many People" (Pons, Rinehart) - 3:15

== Sundazed CD bonus tracks (2000) ==
1. "Funny Little World"
2. "You Better Move On" (Arthur Alexander)
3. "That's A Different Story"
4. "Love Minus Zero" (Bob Dylan)
5. "Be With You"
6. "Too Many People" (single version)
7. "Hey Joe" (promo single version)

== Personnel ==
- Jim Pons – bass guitar, vocals, double bass
- John Beck – vocals, tambourine, harmonica
- Bobby Arlin – lead guitar
- Robert Lee Reiner – rhythm guitar
- Tom Ray – drums
