= Mule (dance) =

The Mule was a dance fad created in 1965 by famed dance instructor Killer Joe Piro based on the earlier "Mule Walk" which was popular in the 1910s.

== The Mule Walk ==
The dominant step of the "mule" is from the "Mule Walk," inspired by the James P. Johnson song of the same title. The dance was popular in the 1910s. The song is in a stride style of music, which is similar to ragtime. Johnson is said to have composed it based on a number of country and square dances he was doing while working at The Jungles Casino around 1913, he later published it in 1938.

== How to do the "Mule Walk" ==
1) Start by standing straight and feet a few inches apart, facing your partner.

2) Lift your right hand high over head, Elbows slightly bent, palms facing forward towards your partner. Lift the right knee forward and bent, about hip height and as you bring the right arm down alongside it with the chest also coming forward. The movement should be vigorous and strongly accented like the 2nd count of the Jerk.

3) Foot comes down, body straightens as left hand is raised overhead.

4) Repeat step 2 with the left arm and foot.

== The Mule ==
In 1965, Smirnoff Vodka hired Killer Joe Piro to create a new dance called the Mule for their new drink of the same name (vodka with a 7-Up mixer), and to release an album of music by Skitch Henderson that included a track with the same name (Skitch Plays The Mule, Mainstream Records - KP-326). However, the track didn't include calls to help people dance the mule. Instead, the singers tell you how to fix yourself the drink. Piro and his partner also appear in an advertisement for the drink.

As for the dance itself, the Mule Walk was usually done at the beginning, partners facing each other and most of the patterns of the dance were based on the Mule Walk. Once the person learned the basic step the rest was said to be easy.

== How to do the Mule ==
One must practice the Mule Walk above well before advancing onto the Mule. Get into that straightening and bending groove when lifting the legs/knees with its strong accents. These accents lamely portray a mule walking.

To make the above into 'The Mule' you would start to turn, Kick your feet, and flap your hands like a Mule and generally do whatever you felt like, keeping the above rhythm going which at times could get difficult to do.

== "The Mule" in Pop Culture ==
- James P. Johnson's recording of "The Mule Walk" is featured on the score of the 1991 film Billy Bathgate starring Nicole Kidman, Dustin Hoffman, and Bruce Willis.
