= Carmen M. Pursifull =

American poet of Puerto Rican descent

Carmen Maria Pursifull (née Padilla; September 1, 1930 – January 26, 2015) was a New York City Latin dance and Latin American music figure of the 1950s, and since 1970 in Illinois, is an English-language free verse poet who was a top ten finalist nominee for Poet Laureate of that state in 2003. Since late 2009 she has been a local public television personality in the Champaign-Urbana area.

== Early life and career ==
Born Carmen Maria Padilla in New York City, she was the youngest of five children to a Puerto Rico-born father and his Army bride from Barcelona, Spain. She grew up in New York City where she left high school after her first marriage in 1946, ending her formal education.

Thereafter she was a member of a New York City interpretive dance troupe, and in 1950 at age twenty she was recruited by Frank "Killer Joe" Piro to partner with him teaching Cha-Cha-Cha and Mambo at the Palladium Ballroom at 53rd St. and Broadway in Manhattan. This thrust her into the center of the Latin dance craze of the time. She became a featured vocalist with Latin American bands in New York City, belonged to American Federation of Musicians Local 802 (Greater New York City), toured widely in the United States, and had extended engagements in the Caribbean including the Caribe Hilton Hotel in San Juan, Puerto Rico with Miguelito Valdés and His Orchestra in 1953 and with Ray Wallis and His Calypso Band at the Virgin Isles Hotel in St. Thomas, U.S. Virgin Islands in 1954.

In 1959 she ceased touring in order to be with her children, and began a sixteen-year career of tending and managing bars in Manhattan. In 1962 she married her fourth husband, John Pursifull, a career non-commissioned officer in the United States Navy.

== Move to Illinois and writing career ==
On John's retirement from the Navy, the Pursifulls moved to Champaign, Illinois where their son was attending the University of Illinois. At his suggestion in 1970, Ms. Pursifull began keeping a diary to ease her adjustment from New York City to Midwestern life. Her writing soon took on rhythm and metaphor, and she joined the newly formed Red Herring Poets workshop, and eventually became its official Matriarch. She is self-educated, obtaining her graduate equivalency diploma in 1979. She has published over 650 poems in the United States and internationally in academic and other refereed poetry journals, has published ten book-length collections, and has read her poetry extensively in academic and community arts settings in Illinois and surrounding states and on the local broadcast media. Since October 8, 2009, Ms. Pursifull reads her poetry on a weekly half-hour prime time television show on Urbana Public Television.

Pursifull is also the mother of Rajiam Pursifull and Adrienne Maria Lindsey Scott, and has eight grandchildren and five great-grandchildren. Pursifull died in January 2015.

== Collections ==
Book-length collections of the poetry of Carmen M. Pursifull are:

- Carmen by Moonlight (1982);
- The Twenty-four Hour Wake (1989);
- Manhattan Memories (1989);
- Elsewhere in a Parallel Universe (1992);
- The Many Faces Of Passion (1996);
- Brimmed Hat With Flowers (2000);
- World Of Wet (with Edward L. Smith, Ph.D.)(2002);
- Carmen by Moonlight 2nd Edition, (2005);
- The Many Faces Of Passion 2nd Edition (2006);
- Probing The Depths of Mind & Matter (2007). and
- Conversations With An Older Woman (2011).

== See also ==
- List of Puerto Rican writers
- List of Puerto Ricans
- Puerto Rican literature
