= Club Meeting =

Live album by Billy Preston
- Released: March 30, 1967
- Recorded: 1965
- Venue: The Trip, West Hollywood, CA
- Genre: Soul
- Length: 30:23
- Label: Capitol
- Producer: Billy Preston, Steve Douglas

Billy Preston chronology
| Wildest Organ in Town! (1966) | Club Meeting (1967) | That's the Way God Planned It (1969) |

Professional ratings
Review scores
| Source | Rating |
|---|---|
| AllMusic | 3/5 stars |

Club Meeting is the first live album by Billy Preston, recorded in 1965 at The Trip on the Sunset Strip in West Hollywood, California, and released in 1967. In 2004, Wildest Organ in Town! and Club Meeting were released together.

== Track listing ==
1. "Introduction (Billy's Theme)" (Billy Preston) – 1:41
2. "Sunny" (Bobby Hebb) – 2:53
3. "I'm Your Hoochie Coochie Man" (Willie Dixon) – 4:31
4. "Billy's Groove" (Preston) – 2:39
5. "No Man Is an Island" (with The Soul Brothers) (Alex Kramer, Joan Whitney) – 3:54
6. "Let the Music Play" (with The Soul Brothers) (Preston, Jesse Kirkland) – 3:02
7. "Wade in the Water" (Traditional, adapted by Preston, H. B. Barnum) – 2:52
8. "Summertime" (George Gershwin, DuBose Heyward) – 4:14
9. "This Little Light of Mine" (Traditional, adapted by Preston, Barnum) – 2:58
10. "Ike's Theme" (Preston) – 2:35
11. "Together" (with The Soul Brothers) (Betsy Buchanan, Viril Hollins) – 2:49
12. "James Brown Medley": (Ted Wright, James Brown, Johnny Terry) – 4:43
  - "Out of Sight"
  - "I Got You (I Feel Good)"
  - "Please, Please, Please"
