= Harlem Shuffle =

1963 single by Bob & Earl

Single by Bob & Earl

from the album Harlem Shuffle
- B-side: "I'll Keep Running Back"
- Released: 1963
- Genre: R&B
- Length: 2:35
- Label: Marc Records 104
- Songwriter: Bob Relf/Earl Nelson
- Producer: Fred Smith

Bob & Earl singles chronology
"Harlem Shuffle" (1963)	"My Woman" (1964)

"Harlem Shuffle" is an R&B song written and originally recorded by the duo Bob & Earl in 1963. The song describes a dance called the “Harlem Shuffle”, and mentions several other contemporary dances of the early 1960s, including the Monkey Shine, the Limbo, the Hitch hike, the Slide, and the Pony. The opening horn fanfare intro from the original 1963 recording was sampled by House of Pain for their 1992 hit "Jump Around".

In 1986, it was covered by the British rock band the Rolling Stones on their album Dirty Work.

== Bob & Earl ==
There was no pre-existing dance called the "Harlem Shuffle". The song was based on an instrumental number called "Slauson Shuffletime" (named after a boulevard in Los Angeles) by another Los Angeles singer, Round Robin. Bob & Earl's original single, arranged by Gene Page, peaked at No. 44 on the Billboard Hot 100 chart and No. 36 on the Cashbox chart. The record was a commercial failure when first released in the UK in 1963, but on reissue in 1969 peaked at No. 7 on the UK singles chart. It was released on Marc Records, a subsidiary of Titan Records. Barry White stated in a 1995 interview with the Boston Herald that, despite many claims to the contrary, he had no involvement with "Harlem Shuffle", though Page and White later worked extensively together.

In 2003, the original Bob & Earl version of the song was ranked No. 23 by the music critics of The Daily Telegraph on their list of the "50 Best Duets Ever". The song was used in the 1989 comedy-drama film Shag and the 2017 Edgar Wright-directed film Baby Driver and also appeared on its soundtrack.

=== Charts ===
Chart (1963–64)	Peak position
US Billboard Hot 100	44
US Billboard Hot R&B Singles	44
US Cash Box Top 100	36

Chart (1969)	Peak position
Belgium (Ultratop 50 Flanders)	8
Netherlands (Dutch Top 40)	8
Netherlands (Single Top 100)	7
UK Singles (Official Charts)	7

== The Rolling Stones version ==
"Harlem Shuffle"

Single by The Rolling Stones

from the album Dirty Work
- B-side: "Had It with You"
- Released: 3 March 1986
- Recorded: April – October 1985
- Genre: Pop rock, dance-rock
- Length: 3:23 (7" single); 6:19 (12" "London Mix"); 6:35 (12" "New York Mix")
- Label: Rolling Stones
- Songwriters: Bob Relf, Earl Nelson
- Producers: Steve Lillywhite and The Glimmer Twins

The Rolling Stones singles chronology
"She Was Hot" (1983)	"Harlem Shuffle" (1986)	"One Hit (To the Body)" (1986)

The Rolling Stones' cover version appeared on their 1986 album Dirty Work. It went to No. 5 on the US Billboard Hot 100 chart, No. 13 in the United Kingdom, and No. 1 in New Zealand. Keith Richards had been looking for songs to possibly include on the album and had been working up songs with Ronnie Wood and Bobby Womack while waiting for Mick Jagger to return to the studio in Paris after doing promo work on his solo album She's the Boss. To Richards' surprise, Jagger liked the feel and cut the vocals quickly. It became the first cover song the Stones had released as an opening single off a new studio album since 1965.

In 1986, a 12" extended single mix of the song was released. One side contained the "London Mix" and ran 6:19. The other side had a "New York Mix" and ran 6:35. Both mixes were variations of the 7" mix. The "New York Mix" is available on the CD, Rarities 1971–2003, although it has been edited to 5:48. Both full-length 12" versions can be found on Disc 25 of Singles 1971–2006.

=== Music video ===
The Rolling Stones produced an accompanying four-minute music video, which combined with live-action and animation. The live-action was directed by animation director Ralph Bakshi and the animation was directed by future The Ren & Stimpy Show creator John Kricfalusi. Other animators who worked on the video included Lynne Naylor, Jim Smith, Bob Jaques, Vicky Jenson, Pat Ventura and two other unknown animators. Adrienne Eggleston Cary was the lead dancer in the video.

=== Personnel ===
The Rolling Stones

- Mick Jagger – lead and backing vocals, harmonica
- Keith Richards – electric and acoustic guitars, piano, backing vocals
- Ronnie Wood – electric, acoustic and pedal steel guitar, tenor saxophone, backing vocals
- Bill Wyman – bass guitar, synthesizer
- Charlie Watts – drums

Additional personnel

- Chuck Leavell – keyboards
- Ivan Neville – backing vocals, bass guitar, organ, synthesizer
- Philippe Saisse – keyboards
- Anton Fig – shakers
- Dan Collette – trumpet
- Ian Stewart – piano
- Marku Ribas – percussion
- Jimmy Cliff, Don Covay, Beverly D'Angelo, Kirsty MacColl, Dolette McDonald, Janice Pendarvis, Patti Scialfa and Tom Waits – backing vocals

=== Charts ===
==== Weekly charts ====
Chart (1986)	Peak position
Australia (Kent Music Report)	6
Austria (Ö3 Austria Top 40)	13
Belgium (Ultratop 50 Flanders)	4
Belgium (VRT Top 30 Flanders)	4
Canada Top Singles (RPM)	5
Europe (European Hot 100 Singles)	3
Finland (Suomen virallinen lista)	2
France (SNEP)	28
Ireland (IRMA)	8
Netherlands (Dutch Top 40)	5
Netherlands (Single Top 100)	5
New Zealand (Recorded Music NZ)	1
Norway (VG-lista)	6
South Africa (Springbok Radio)	30
Spain (AFYVE)	7
Sweden (Sverigetopplistan)	11
Switzerland (Schweizer Hitparade)	10
UK Singles (Official Charts)	13
US Billboard Hot 100	5
US Billboard Hot Dance Club Play^{1}	4
US Billboard Hot Dance Music/Maxi-Singles Sales^{1}	5
US Billboard Hot Mainstream Rock Tracks	2
West Germany (GfK)	11

^{1}Remix

==== Year-end charts ====
Chart (1986)	Position
Australia (Kent Music Report)	49
Belgium (Ultratop)	75
Canada Top Singles (RPM)	48
Europe (European Hot 100 Singles)	52
Netherlands (Single Top 100)	58
New Zealand (Recorded Music NZ)	18

=== Certifications ===
Region	Certification	Certified units/sales
Canada (Music Canada)	Gold	50,000^{^}
^{^} Shipments figures based on certification alone.

== Other versions ==
A version by The Traits from the fall of 1966 reached number 94 on the US Billboard Hot 100 and number 91 on Cash Box. Wayne Cochran released a version in 1965 that reached 127 on the Billboard charts. The Action recorded the song in 1968 and released it as a single in Germany. The Belle Stars released their version in 1983. "Weird Al" Yankovic included an excerpt of the song (as the "Harlem Polka") for the titular polka medley of his album Polka Party! in 1986.
