= Bob Relf =

American R&B singer (1937–2007)

Rob Relf
- Also known as: Bob Relf; Bobby Relf; Bobby Garrett; Bobby Valentino
- Born: Robert Nelson Relf; January 10, 1937
- Origin: Los Angeles, California, U.S.
- Died: November 20, 2007 (aged 70) Bakersfield, California, U.S.
- Genres: Soul music R&B; Northern soul
- Occupations: Singer, songwriter, record producer
- Years active: 1954–2007

Robert Nelson Relf (January 10, 1937 – November 20, 2007) was an American R&B and soul musician. Best known as half of the soul music duo Bob & Earl whose song, Harlem Shuffle was released in the US in 1963 and in the UK in 1964. It was re-released 1969 reaching No 7 in the UK charts. Relf's recording of the song "Blowing My Mind to Pieces" was written by Lou Barreto as well as being produced by Lou Barreto and Rod Bumgardner. The song became popular on the Northern soul scene in the UK in the 1970s.

== Musical career ==
Relf attended Fremont High School, Los Angeles, and in 1954 joined fellow pupils Sam Jackson, Ted Brown and Ronald Brown in forming a doo wop group, The Laurels. They recorded on the Combo and the Cash Record labels. Their "Our Love" an operatic ballad on the Cash label was described by the music writer Jim Dawson as one of Relf's best recordings – "a strange, lugubrious performance that sounds like nothing else". Relf's solo recording of "Little Fool" followed in 1956 without success. He spent short stints with the Crescendoes, the Upfronts, Valentino and the Lovers (Donna Records) The Hollywood Flames and Bobby Day and the Satellites. With the Crescendos, he recorded "Finders Keepers", "I'll Be Seeing You" and "Sweet Dreams" for Atlantic Records in 1956, alongside Prentice Moreland, Young Jessie of The Flairs, and Bobby Byrd of The Hollywood Flames.

=== Bob and Earl ===
Bobby Day formed the original Bob & Earl duo in 1957 with Earl Nelson. When Day left to go solo in 1962, Relf took his place. They recorded Harlem Shuffle in 1963 a song part-arranged by the keyboards player, Barry White.

=== Bobby Valentino ===
As 'Bobby Valentino he recorded Special Delivery b/w How Deep Is The Ocean for the West Coast label Lita label

=== Bobby Garrett ===
Using the pseudonym 'Bobby Garrett' he recorded two singles on the Mirwood label in 1966. "I Can't Get Away" became a Northern soul favourite in the UK and was used to advertise Kentucky Fried Chicken on national TV in the US. Also popular was "My Little Girl" which originally appeared as the flip side of the soulful ballad "Big Brother".

=== Northern soul ===
Relf's song and most popular solo track, "Blowing My Mind To Pieces", was recorded at Ray Charles' RPM studios in Los Angeles. The uplifting song was written by Lou Barreto and produced by Lou Barreto and Rod Bumgardner. The song was also a hit on the Northern Soul scene in the early 1970s. It was re-released in the UK in 1974 using Relf's name but was by a completely different singer.

=== Later career ===
Relf wrote and produced songs for Jackie Lee including "The Chicken" and "African Boo-Ga-Loo". In the early 1970s Relf resumed working with Barry White helping to produce discs by Love Unlimited, Gloria Scott and White Heat. A Relf composition, "Bring Back My Yesterday", was recorded by White in 1973 on the album I've Got So Much to Give. He also co-wrote, with White, the B side, "I Should Have Known", from Love Unlimited's hit single, "Walkin' In The Rain with the One I Love".

== Death ==
Having been ill for several years, Relf died at his home in Bakersfield in 2007. He was buried at the Evergreen Cemetery in Los Angeles on November 27, 2007.
