= Lisa Kindred =

American singer (1940–2019)

Lisa Kindred (1940 – November 11, 2019) was an American folk and blues singer.

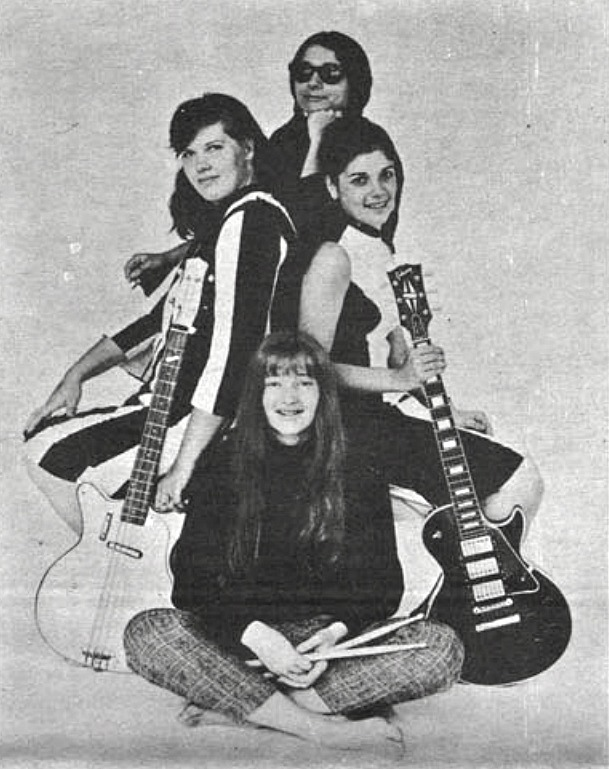
The UFOs in 1966. Clockwise from left: Lisa Kindred, Helena Tribuno, Ann Sternberg, Laurie Stanton

Kindred, born in 1940 in Buffalo, New York, was a figure in the Greenwich Village and Cambridge, Massachusetts folk scenes of the 1960s. She played with Bob Dylan, Dave Van Ronk and other legendary folk singers, and was mentored by guitarist and songwriter Fred Neil. She performed at the Cafe Wha?, Club 47, The Bitter End and other venues. In that extraordinary musical era in the Village, she was influenced as well by visiting blues greats such as Mississippi John Hurt and Skip James and legendary jazz pianist/composers McCoy Tyner and Thelonious Monk.

Kindred's debut album, I Like It This Way, was released on Vanguard Records in 1965. Her second album was to have been released on Vanguard in 1966 under the title Kindred Spirit, but the master tapes were stolen either by Mel Lyman, a musician in the backing band and soon-to-be leader of the cult, the [Mel] "Lyman Family," or someone who delivered them to Lyman. The album was only released four years later on Warner Bros./Reprise Records under the aegis of the Lyman Family, titled American Avatar - Love Comes Rolling Down. The album cover showed a picture of Lyman, not Kindred. That was Kindred's last album on a major label. She became a long-time fixture on the San Francisco bar scene, appearing on occasional compilations and two self-released albums, Steppin' Up In Class (2003) and Blues and Beyond (2013).

In 1966, she organized and was the rhythm guitarist and lead singer with the UFOs, an avant-garde, all-female rock band. The band also featured Ann Sternberg (bass guitar), Diane Tribuno (lead guitar), Laurie Stanton (drums), and later, Carole Carión (drums). She and the other members were interviewed by David Oppenheim for the 1967 documentary Inside Pop: The Rock Revolution, which also interviewed Graham Nash, Brian Wilson, Frank Zappa, and, from Herman's Hermits, singer Peter Noone. In the 1967 movie The Love-Ins, the group, now with Carole Carión as the group's drummer and Lorry Stanton backing vocals, percussion, performed their song "Hello World".

Kindred formed and led the Haight-Ashbury band Ascension, featuring lead guitarist Debbie Olcese and Kindred on rhythm guitar. Ascension's original bassist was a woman named Maus. She and the Grateful Dead's Phil Lesh owned two of the first Alembic basses in San Francisco. Ascension rocked the Great American Music Hall, opening twice in one night for the legendary Etta James. Ascension's drummer was Chuck Bernstein, keyboards was Malcolm Rockwell; Maus left the group in 1974, replaced by Gary Nelson on a blonde 1968 Fender Telecaster bass. Kindred played and sang for many decades at the Saloon in North Beach in San Francisco and other venues. She sang on the 2009 album, Stu Blank and Friends, which included Charlie Musselwhite and Tommy Castro. In 2013, after co-producing it over four years with keyboardist Austin deLone, and joined by Dennis Geyer, Willie Riser and Dick McDonough, she released Blues and Beyond. San Francisco Chronicle music critic Joel Selvin, though not given to effusiveness, took the occasion to describe her as a "bona fide blues queen who sings like one of the greats."

In addition to her decades-long contributions to the folk and blues community in her hometown of Mill Valley, Marin County, California, along with her many gigs at the Sweetwater Music Hall and other local venues. She has made civic contributions as well, directing the city's juvenile play program, while working for years as a teacher's aide at Park School.

Kindred died in San Rafael, California on November 11, 2019 at the age of 79 from POEMS syndrome.

== Discography ==
- 1964: New Folks Volume 2 (Vanguard)
- 1965: I like it this way (Vanguard)
- 1966: The Lyman Family with Lisa Kindred: American Avatar Love Comes Rolling Down (Vanguard)
- 2009: BBQ Blues - Live from the Majic Lamp (Jackalope Records)
- 2012: Lisa Kindred Band: Steppin' Up in Class (The Saloon Recordings)
- 2013: Blues and Beyond (Floating Records)
