= The Rocky Fellers =

Filipino-born pop/rock band

The Rocky Fellers were a Filipino-born pop/rock band discovered by Stanley Kahn in the 1960s, who signed them to Scepter Records. The group was composed of four Filipino brothers: Tony, Junior, Eddie and Albert Maligmat, and their father, Doroteo "Moro" Maligmat. They had a hit single called "Killer Joe", written by Bert Russell, Phil Medley, and Bob Elgin in 1963. The song was inspired by famed dance instructor and 'King of the Discothèque', Killer Joe Piro.

"Killer Joe" reached number 16 on the Billboard Hot 100 on May 18, 1963. They followed up with another Bob Elgin song called "Like the Big Guys Do", which peaked as high as number 55 on the Billboard Hot 100. Among their other recordings was a Christmas novelty song, "Santa, Santa", written by a then-unknown songwriter, Neil Diamond. The Rocky Fellers also recorded another Neil Diamond song, "We Got Love" which is available on their LP, Killer Joe from 1963. The Rocky Fellers faded quickly from the music scene in the mid-1960s, primarily due to the arriving British Invasion bands and lack of interest from other record buyers.

Tony Maligmat died on March 4, 2007, at the age of 62.

Albert joined the Society of Seven in the 1970s where he was billed as "Little Albert" Maligmat, played drums and electric bass, and was the lead vocalist on one of the group's biggest hits, "99.8". He left the group to pursue a solo career but returned for several years in the 1980s.

As of November, 2017, Albert and Eddie are performing in Waikiki.

Later, the group would go on to form under a brand new name, The Fellers in the Rockys (The American Mountain Range).

== Discography ==
=== Singles ===
Year	Title	Peak chart positions	Record Label	B-side	Album
Year	Title	US Pop	Record Label	B-side	Album
1962	"Long Tall Sally"	—	Parkway	"South Pacific Twist"	
1962	"Santa, Santa"	—	Scepter	"Great Big World"	
1963	"Killer Joe"	16	Scepter	"Lonely Teardrops"	Killer Joe
1963	"Like the Big Guys Do"	55	Scepter	"Great Big World"	Killer Joe
1963	"Ching-A-Ling Baby"	—	Scepter	"Hey Little Donkey"	
1963	"Bye Bye Baby"	—	Scepter	"She Make Me Wanna Dance"	
1964	"My Prayer"	—	Scepter	"Two Guys From Trinidad"	Killer Joe
1964	"(Everybody Wants to Be A) Tiger"	—	Warner Bros.	"Jeannie Memsah"	
1964	"Nina"	—	Warner Bros.	"Better Let Her Go"	
1965	"Don't Throw My Toys Away"	—	Warner Bros.	"The Man With the Blue Guitar"	
1965	"Two Steps Downstairs in the Basement"	—	Warner Bros.	"Rented Tuxedo"	
