= Hully Gully =

Type of line dance

The Hully Gully is a type of unstructured line dance often considered to have originated in the 1960s, but is also mentioned some forty years earlier as a dance common in the black juke joints in the first part of the twentieth century. In its modern form, it consisted of a series of dance steps called out by the MC. Each step was relatively simple and easy to execute; however, the challenge was to keep up with the speed of each step.

The phrase "Hully Gully" or "Hull da Gull" comes from a folk game in which a player shakes a handful of nuts or seeds and asks his opponent "Hully Gully, how many?"

== Modern form ==
The Hully Gully was started by Frank Rocco at the Cadillac Hotel in Miami Beach, Florida. In 1959 The Olympics sang the song "Hully Gully", which involved no physical contact at all. In 1961 the Olympics version of the song was popularized in the south of England by the first version of Zoot Money's Big Roll Band and involved the audience facing the stage in lines and dancing the steps of the "Southampton jive". The same tune appeared in 1961 in a song by the Marathons, entitled "Peanut Butter", which was later used for the Peter Pan Peanut Butter commercial during the 1980s. Tim Morgan sang different lyrics to the song "Peanut Butter" as well, however, only mentioning the Skippy brand. There was another song about the dance by The Dovells, entitled "Hully Gully Baby". The Jive Five had a hit called "Hully Gully Callin' Time"; Ike & Tina Turner had a song in their repertoire known as "If You Can Hully Gully (I Can Hully Gully Too)". Ed Sullivan mentioned the Cadillac Hotel as "Home of the Hully Gully" on his weekly show, featuring some dancers from Frank Rocco's revue. Known as "Mr. Hully Gully", Rocco then toured America (including the 1964 New York World's Fair—he danced it with Goldie Hawn) and Europe, where over the next year he taught the dance at the NATO Base in Naples, Italy, in Rome, and all over Europe.

== In popular culture ==
- An example of the Hully Gully can be seen performed by John Belushi in the film The Blues Brothers.
- In The Wanderers by Richard Price, the Hully Gully is enacted.
- A Greek version of the song was performed in the 1964 Greek film I Soferina.
- Sam the Sham and the Pharaohs' 1965 hit "Wooly Bully" was originally called "Hully Gully", but the band could not record it under that name due to the prior existence of a recorded song with that title. In addition, the speed of the beats did not fit the steps of the Hully Gully.
- The Portuguese band Conjunto Académico João Paulo had a 1965 hit with the song "Hully Gully do Montanhês" (English: "Mountain Man's Hully Gully")
- In the 1986 Cheers episode "Save the Last Dance for Me," Carla fondly recalls dancing on a local Boston television show in her youth, until "they made up that stupid rule . . . that pregnant 16-year-olds can't Hully Gully on TV."
- In a 1993 episode of the TV series The Simpsons, Gabbo, a ventriloquist's dummy, dances wildly while singing, "I can do the Hully Gully!"
- In a 1990 episode of Roseanne called "PMS, I Love You" it was described by Darlene as a dance that no child should have to witness their parents doing.
- In the Homestar Runner short "Ballad of The Sneak", The Sneak is said to have done the Hully Gully on the Panama Canal.
