= Marshall Leib =

- Born: Marshall Philip Leibovitz; January 26, 1939; Los Angeles, California, United States
- Died: March 15, 2002 (aged 63) Northridge, Los Angeles, California, U.S.
- Genres: Pop
- Occupation: Singer

Marshall Leib (January 26, 1939 – March 15, 2002) was an American singer and one of the original members of The Teddy Bears. Leib and his high school friend, producer Phil Spector, formed the trio. Leib performed background harmony vocals on the Teddy Bears hit "To Know Him Is to Love Him", a number-one song in the United States in 1958 which was covered by artists such as Dolly Parton and Amy Winehouse.

== Biography ==
Leib was involved with the movie "Ode to Billie Joe" which featured the hit "Ode To Billie Joe" by Bobbie Gentry. He also worked with Herb Alpert, Jerry Moss, The We Five, Chris Montez and Ralph Williams/The Marauders during their early years at A&M Records.

In 1966, Leib was hired by Randy Wood to produce the album "Songs of Protest and Anti-Protest" by "Chris Lucey" (who was in actuality Bobby Jameson) for Surrey Records.

In 1967, Leib produced a twelve-song L.P. for a group called The Brownstones that featured top session drummer Sandy Konikoff along with vocalist Aaron Brownstone, guitarist Dick Douglas and bassist Tom Hankins. He was attempting to create a "supergroup", but the vocalist was killed in a motorcycle accident and Konikoff went on to play with Taj Mahal and others. Collectors are looking for a copy of this Leib-produced missing LP, but it is believed that ABC Records destroyed all copies.

Leib later became involved with the L.A. Street Scene, a yearly festival held in the streets of downtown L.A. that was the precursor to the modern super festival.

Leib collected Ferrari automobiles and belonged to a Ferrari club. He was also a classic (antique) automobile aficionado. In the 1990s, Leib produced an album of female vocal Christmas songs. Leib married, divorced, and later suffered a fatal heart attack. He is survived by two biological sons (Jason Leib and Lucas Leib) and one adopted son, Jason Lawrence.
