= The Vibrations =

American soul group

- Also known as: The Jay Hawks, the Vibrating Vibrations, the Marathons
- Origin: Los Angeles, California, U.S.
- Genres: Soul, rhythm and blues
- Years active: 1955–1976
- Labels: Checker Records, Okeh Records, Mandala Records
- Past members: Dave Govan (deceased); Carl Fisher; James Johnson (deceased); Richard 'Ricky' Owens (deceased); Don Bradley; Tommy Turner; Carver Bunkum

The Vibrations were an American soul vocal group from Los Angeles, California, active from the mid-1950s to 1976. Most notable among the group's hit singles were "My Girl Sloopy" (1964) and "Love in Them There Hills" (1968). They also had a hit with the up-tempo song "Surprise Party for Baby" (1971) in the UK, popular on the Northern soul scene. The quintet's members included Don Bradley, Carl Fisher, Dave Govan, James Johnson and Ricky Owens.

== History ==
The group initially began recording as The Jay Hawks, and had a hit in 1956 with "Stranded in the Jungle" (US No. 18). After a few lineup changes, the group had another hit with the song "The Watusi" in 1961 (US No. 25); concurrently, they had a hit under the name The Marathons with "Peanut Butter", a rewritten version of the Olympics' "Hully Gully" with new lyrics by Hidle Brown Barnum and Martin Cooper (No. 20).

The group recorded a couple of Northern soul classics since their initial hit on Atlantic Records in 1963. A cover version of their song "My Girl Sloopy", retitled "Hang On Sloopy", was a hit for the McCoys in 1965.

Their 1968 track "Cause You're Mine" (Epic Records 5-10418, although originally on Okeh Records) is listed at number 48 in The Northern Soul Top 500 by Kev Roberts. Roberts stated: "This track knocks you sideways by the 4th bar and continues to race against time, leaving you collapsed in a heap of delight!".

A later single, "Surprise Party for Baby" attributed to The Vibrating Vibrations (Neptune Records N-28) is listed at number 188 in The Northern Soul Top 500, and was practically a new single when used in the Northern soul scene at Blackpool Mecca in 1971. Roberts added: "The intro and subsequent 'Hey, Hey, Hey, Hey' harmony works a treat into dragging you onto the dance floor. A further hook, 'Hope She's Going to Show Up' is typical Gamble and Huff, being reminiscent of the Intruders cuts a couple of years later".

The Vibrations briefly broke up in 1971. At this time, Owens became a member of the Temptations, although he was let go after his first few engagements. Owens and the other Vibrations regrouped and continued, eventually becoming a nightclub act in the mid-1970s, before officially dissolving the group in 1976. Ricky Owens died in 1995.

== Discography ==
=== Albums ===
- Watusi! (Checker Records, 1961)
- Peanut Butter (Arvee Records, 1961) (as the Marathons)
- Misty (Okeh Records, 1964)
- Shout! (Okeh Records, 1965)
- New Vibrations (Okeh Records, 1966)
- Taking a New Step (Mandala Records, 1972)

=== Singles ===
Year	Song	Peak chart positions		
Year	Song	US Pop	US R&B	Canada CHUM/RPM
1956	"Stranded in the Jungle"	18	9	―
1960	"So Blue"	110	―	―
1961	"The Watusi"	25	13	17
1961	"Peanut Butter"	20	25	―
1961	"The Junkernoo"	112	—	―
1964	"My Girl Sloopy"	26	10	―
1964	"Sloop Dance"	109	—	―
1965	"Keep On Keeping On"	118	―	―
1965	"End Up Crying"	130	―	―
1965	"Misty"	63	26	27
1966	"And I Love Her"	118	47	―
1967	"Pick Me"	―	39	―
1968	"Love in Them There Hills"	93	38	―
1968	"Cause You're Mine"	—	―	―
1971	"Surprise Party for Baby"	—	―	―
"—" denotes releases that did not chart.
