= Bobby Day =

American singer and producer (1930–1990)

- Also known as: The
- Born: Robert James Byrd; July 1, 1928; Fort Worth, Texas, U.S.
- Died: July 27, 1990 (aged 62) Los Angeles, California, U.S.
- Genres: Rock and roll; R&B; soul; pop; doo-wop
- Occupations: Singer; songwriter; record producer
- Instruments: Vocals; piano; keyboards
- Years active: 1950–1990
- Formerly of: The Hollywood Flames; Bob and Earl

Robert James Byrd (July 1, 1928 – July 27, 1990), known by the stage name Bobby Day, was an American singer, multi-instrumentalist, music producer, and songwriter. He is best known for his hit record "Rockin' Robin", written by Leon René under the pseudonym Jimmie Thomas. Day also wrote the top-10 Billboard hits "Little Bitty Pretty One" and "Over and Over".

== Biography ==
Born in Fort Worth, Texas, United States, Day moved to Los Angeles, California, at age 15. His first recording was "Young Girl" in 1949 in the R&B group that the Hollywood Flames released in 1950 on the Selective Label. He went several years with minor musical success limited to the West Coast.

Day recorded under numerous other names: The Jets, The Voices, The Sounds, The Crescendos, and as the original "Bob" in the duo Bob & Earl with singer Earl Nelson. As a member of the Flames, he used the stage name Bobby Day. Day's penned song, "Buzz-Buzz-Buzz", was that outfit's first and biggest success.

In 1957, Day formed his own band called the Satellites, following which Day recorded three songs that are seen today as rock and roll classics.

Day's best known songwriting efforts were "Over and Over", later made popular by the Dave Clark Five in 1965, and "Little Bitty Pretty One", popularized by Thurston Harris in 1957, Frankie Lymon in 1960, Clyde McPhatter in 1962, and the Jackson Five in 1972. However, Day is most remembered for his 1958 solo recording of the Hot 100 No. 2 hit, "Rockin' Robin", written by Leon Rene under the pseudonym Jimmie Thomas. It sold over one million copies and was awarded a gold record. The song was covered by Bob Luman at Town Hall Party on October 28, 1958, the Hollies in 1964, Gene Vincent in 1969, Michael Jackson in 1972, Lolly in 1999, and by McFly in 2006.

In 2012–13, Day's uncharted recording, "Beep-Beep-Beep", was the musical soundtrack for a Kia Sorento television commercial shown nationwide in the US.

Day died of prostate cancer on July 27, 1990, at age 62, and is buried in Holy Cross Cemetery in Culver City, California.

== Discography ==
=== Albums ===
- Rockin' with Robin (1959)
- The Best of Bobby Day (1984)
- The Original Rockin' Robin (1987)
- The Great Bobby Day (1994)
- Rockin' Robin (1994)
- The Best of Bobby Day (2001)
- The Very Best Of (2016)
- Robins, Bluebirds, Buzzards & Orioles - The Bobby Day Story (2021)

=== Singles ===
| Year | Title | Credited as | Chart positions | | Release date |
| Year | Title | Credited as | US | US R&B | Release date |
|---|---|---|---|---|---|
| 1950 | "Young Girl" / "Please Tell Me Now" | The Flames | | | |
| 1952 | "Wheel of Fortune" / "Later" | The Four Flames | | | |
| 1957 | "Buzz-Buzz-Buzz" | The Hollywood Flames | 11 | 5 | October 1957 |
| 1957 | "Little Bitty Pretty One" | Bobby Day and the Satellites | 57 | — | August 1957 |
| 1958 | "Rockin' Robin" | Bobby Day | 2 | 1 | June 27, 1958 |
| 1958 | "Over and Over" | Bobby Day | 41 | 1 | June 27, 1958 |
| | "The Bluebird, the Buzzard, and the Oriole" | Bobby Day | 54 | — | November 26, 1958 |
| 1959 | "That's All I Want" | Bobby Day | 98 | — | February 1959 |
| 1959 | "Gotta a New Girl" | Bobby Day | 82 | — | May 1959 |
| 1960 | "Gee Whiz" | Bob and Earl | 103 | — | |

== Television appearances ==
- The Dick Clark Show (two episodes) (1958)
- American Bandstand (four episodes) (1958)
- The Cinnamon Cinder Show (1963)
- The Midnight Special (1973)
