= Mirwood Records =

Defunct American record label

Mirwood Records was an American record label founded by former Vee-Jay executive Randy Wood in Los Angeles in 1965.

The Mirwood label was a sister label to Mira Records. It primarily released rhythm and blues and jazz recordings, and has been described as "among the definitive Northern soul labels". Many of its records were written and produced by Fred Smith and arranged by James Carmichael, who (according to Jason Ankeny at AllMusic) "hone[d] a distinctive style all their own, creating soul music that was both relentlessly energetic and sweetly sophisticated, topped off by trademark vibes that evoked the otherworldly beauty of a Pacific Ocean sunset".

The label found success with its second single, "The Duck", credited to Jackie Lee, actually Earl Nelson of Bob & Earl. Other artists recorded on the Mirwood label included The Olympics and Bobby Garrett, the other half of Bob & Earl. The last singles released on the label were issued in 1968; several various artists compilations were issued in the early 1970s.

Several compilations of Mirwood releases have been issued on CD.
