= The Leaves =

American garage rock band

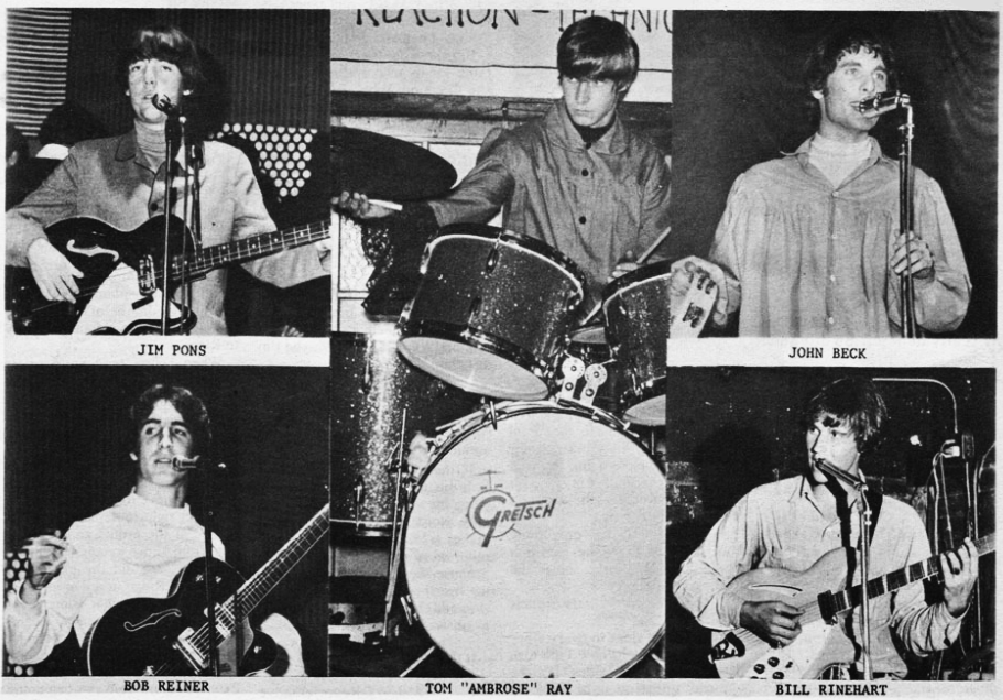
- The Leaves in 1965.

Background information
- Origin: San Fernando Valley, California, U.S.
- Genres: Garage rock; folk rock; psychedelic rock
- Years active: 1964–1967, 1970–1971
- Labels: Mira, Capitol
- Past members: Jim Pons; Robert Lee Reiner; John Beck; Bill Rinehart; Jimmy Kern; Tom Ray; Bobby Arlin; Buddy Sklar; Al Nichol; Bob "Bullet" Bailey

The Leaves were an American garage rock band formed in the San Fernando Valley, California, in 1964. They are best known for their version of the song "Hey Joe", which was a hit in 1966. Theirs is the earliest release of this song, which became a rock standard.

== History ==
The band was founded by bass player Jim Pons and guitarist Robert Lee Reiner, who were inspired by hearing The Beatles while students at Cal State Northridge (then known as San Fernando Valley State College) in Los Angeles. Originally called The Rockwells, they were in a fraternity together, formed a group, and taught themselves how to play. Besides Pons and Reiner, the original line-up included John Beck (vocals), Bill Rinehart (lead guitar), and Jimmy Kern (drums); in early 1965, Kern was replaced by drummer Tom Ray.

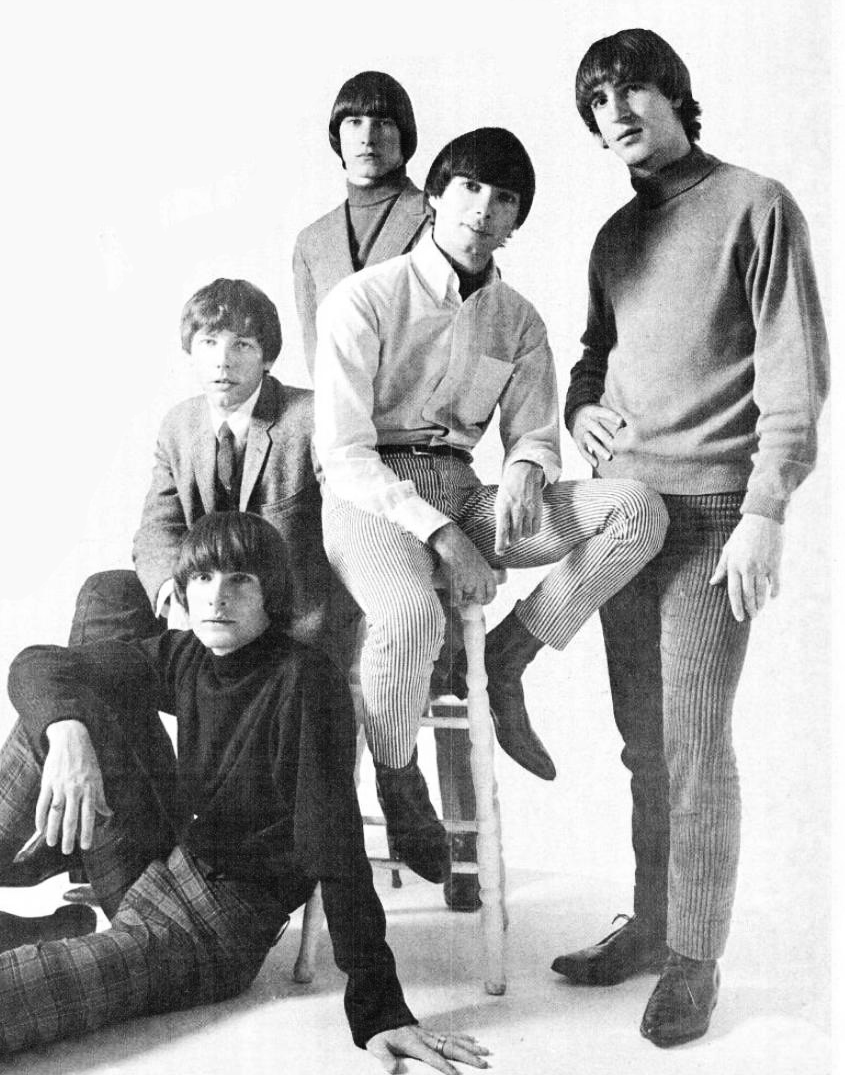
The Leaves in 1966. Front, seated on floor: John Beck Middle, from left: Jim Pons, Bobby Arlin, Robert Lee Reiner Back:Tom Ray

They began by playing surf and dance music at parties. In 1965, The Byrds left their residency at Ciro's on Sunset Strip after making their first hit, and The Leaves (as they were by then known) were chosen to replace them. They were discovered by popular singer and actor Pat Boone, who got them their first record contract, with Mira Records.

Their first single, "Too Many People," was a local hit in Los Angeles. The Leaves released "Hey Joe" in November 1965 and, dissatisfied with the sound, pulled it. They released a second version in early 1966, which flopped. Original guitarist Bill Rinehart left, and The Leaves redid the song again with a fuzztone by new guitarist Bobby Arlin. This version of the song became a hit and debuted on both Billboard and Cash Box on May 21, 1966. It peaked at No. 31 on Billboard and No. 29 on the Canadian RPM Magazine charts, while showing a humbler peak position of No. 43 on Cash Box. The song ran nine weeks on both national charts.

Their debut album Hey Joe followed. It took a run on the Billboard charts for five weeks, beginning on July 30, 1966, peaking at No. 127. The album did not make it onto the Cash Box charts.

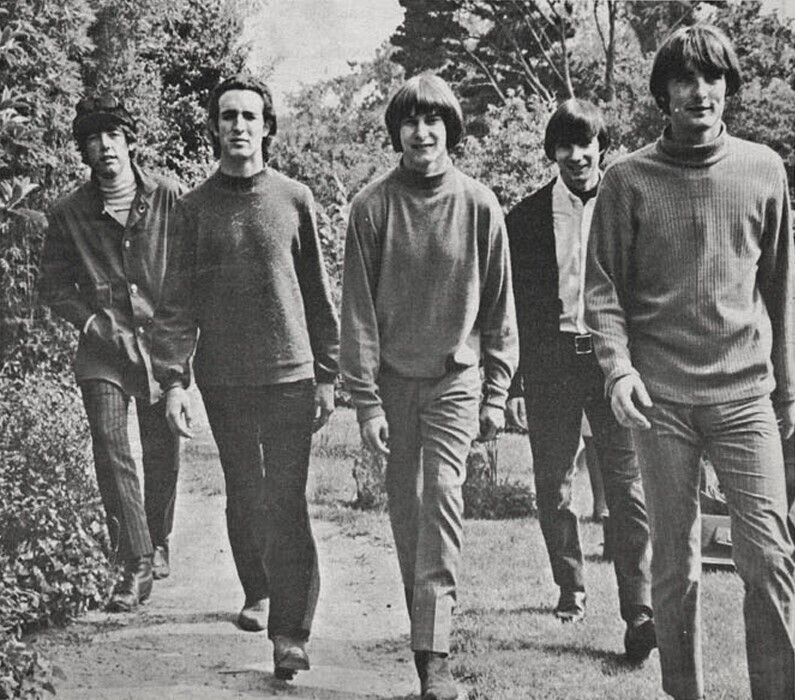
The Leaves in the July 2, 1966 issue of KRLA Beat

The band appeared on TV shows – American Bandstand, Shivaree, Shebang – and briefly in the film The Cool Ones (1967). One more album, All the Good That's Happening, was released before the band broke up in 1967 when Pons left to join the pop group The Turtles; in the early 1970s, Pons played bass with Frank Zappa. Arlin formed the heavy psychedelic band The Hook and The Robert Savage Group. The band reunited in 1970 before Pons became a member of Zappa's band. The reunited lineup included Jim Pons on rhythm guitar, John Beck on lead guitar, Buddy Sklar, lead singer from The Hook and The Spencer Davis Group, Al Nichols on bass from the Turtles, and Bob "Bullet" Bailey on drums. The band did some touring, performed at local Los Angeles based nightclubs, then disbanded in 1971.

A new generation of music fans discovered the band when their version of "Hey Joe" was included in the classic 1972 garage rock compilation Nuggets. According to the album's liner notes, the as-yet-unnamed band was hanging around a tree-shaded pool, smoking, when a newcomer gave the traditional 1960s greeting "What's happening?" "The leaves are happening", came the answer, which struck them all as a good name for a band.

Bobby Arlin (born March 7, 1940, in Petaluma, California) died on February 4, 2010, at age 69.

Bill Rinehart (born February 14, 1946) died on April 18, 2017, aged 71.

Jim Pons and John Beck reunited to perform Hey Joe at the Alex Theatre on May 19, 2023. The performance was Beck's first time in the spotlight since disappearing from the music scene in 1971.

== Members ==
=== 1960s ===
- Jim Pons – bass guitar, vocals, double bass
- John Beck – vocals, tambourine, harmonica
- Bill Rinehart – lead guitar, replaced by Bobby Arlin
- Tom Ray – drums
- Robert Lee Reiner – rhythm guitar

=== 1970s ===
- Jim Pons – rhythm guitar
- John Beck – lead guitar
- Buddy Sklar – lead vocals
- Al Nichol – bass
- Bob "Bullet" Bailey – drums

== Discography ==
=== US singles ===
- "Love Minus Zero"/"Too Many People" : Mira 202 (1965)
- "Hey Joe, Where You Gonna Go"/"Be with You" : Mira 207 (Nov. 1965)
- "You Better Move On"/"A Different Story" : Mira 213 (1966)
- "Be with You"/"Funny Little Word" : Mira 220 (1966)
- "Hey Joe"/"Girl from the East" : Mira 222 (1966)
- "Hey Joe"/"Funny Little World" : Mira 222 (1966) (Mira 222 was issued with two different B-sides)
- "Too Many People"/"Girl from the East" : Mira 227 (1966)
- "Get Out of My Life Woman"/"Girl from the East" : Mira 231 (1966)
- "Be with You"/"You Better Move On" : Mira 234 (1966)
- "Lemmon Princess"/"Twilight Sanctuary" : Capitol 5799 (Dec. 1966)

=== Albums ===
- Hey Joe (1966) Mira LP 3005 (mono)/LPS 3005 (stereo)
- All The Good That's Happening (1967) Capitol T 2638 (mono)/ST 2638 (stereo)
- The Leaves 1966 (1982) Panda PA003
