= Gentle Soul =

The Gentle Soul was a folk band formed in 1966 by singer-songwriters Pamela Polland and Rick Stanley. The band's music contained spiritual influences and an emphasis on creative and elaborate vocal harmonies. Their eponymous album appeared on Epic Records, together with a number of non-LP singles. Columbia Records released one record by the Gentle Soul, which was produced by Terry Melcher. The group consisted of Riley Wildflower, Pamela Polland, Rick Stanley and Sandy Konikoff. For a short time, the group included Jackson Browne. The Gentle Soul recordings have become a coveted classic, and the original vinyl album is now a pricey collector’s item.

In 2002, Sundazed Records re-mastered and released the entire Gentle Soul collection, (the album, the singles and some never-released demos).
