= Earl Nelson (singer) =

American singer and songwriter (1928–2008)

- Also known as: Jackie Lee; Chip Nelson; Earl Cosby; Jay Dee
- Born: Earl Lee Nelson; September 8, 1928; Lake Charles, Louisiana, U.S.
- Died: July 12, 2008 (aged 79) Los Angeles, California, U.S.
- Genres: R&B, soul
- Labels: Class; Ebb; Mira; Mirwood; Keymen; ABC; Uni; Capitol; Warner Bros.

Earl Lee Nelson (September 8, 1928 – July 12, 2008), who also performed as Jackie Lee, was an American soul singer and songwriter. He started his career in the doo-wop group the Hollywood Flames in the 1950s before founding the R&B duo Bob & Earl with Bobby Byrd. As Jackie Lee, he was best known for his hit song "The Duck" (#14 Pop, #4 R&B).

== Biography ==
Earl Lee Nelson was born in Lake Charles, Louisiana on September 8, 1928. He sang in his church's gospel choir in his youth before his family relocated to Los Angeles in 1937. Nelson enlisted in the U.S. Army at the age of 17, working on the construction of the Panama Canal.

In the 1950s, he began singing doo-wop and joined the Hollywood Flames. He sang lead on the 1957 single "Buzz Buzz Buzz" which reached #11 on the Billboard Hot 100 and #5 on the R&B chart. Nelson and Bobby Byrd, not to be confused with Bobby Byrd of the Famous Flames, collaborated as Bobby "Baby Face" Byrd & the Birds as well as Bobby Day & the Satellites. In 1957, Nelson released his first solo single, "Oh Gee Oh Golly" / "I Bow To You," on Class Records. That year, Nelson and Byrd released their first single as Bob & Earl, "You Made a Boo-Boo," on Class. In 1958, Nelson sang background vocals on Day's single "Rockin' Robin" (#2 Pop, #1 R&B). Afterwards, they left the Hollywood Flames, but after a few years, Byrd left Bob & Earl to focus on his solo career.

Bob Relf from the Laurels replaced Byrd, and the new Bob & Earl recorded for different labels before releasing "Harlem Shuffle" on Marc Records in 1963. The single reached the Top 50 in the US and years later the Top 10 in the UK. Their follow up singles were not as successful. In 1965, Nelson relaunched a solo career on Mira Records with the single "Ooh Honey Baby," credited to Earl Cosby. Later that year, Nelson signed to Mirwood Records recorded as Jackie Lee. Jackie was Nelson's wife's name and Lee his own middle name. He released his biggest single "The Duck" in November 1965 and by January it peaked at #14 on the Billboard Hot 100 and #4 on the R&B chart. In 1966, he released his only album, The Duck, which reached #85 on the Billboard's Top LP's chart and #8 on the R&B chart. Though Nelson did not have further chart success, his later singles on Mirwood are popular in Northern soul circles. Nelson later recorded for ABC-Paramount and Uni Records. Barry White produced his 1974 Warner Bros. single "Strange Funky Games and Things" (credited to Jay Dee).

Nelson continued to perform around Los Angeles, but he was later diagnosed with Alzheimer's disease. Nelson died at the age of 79 in Los Angeles on July 12, 2008. At the time of his death, Nelson had been married three times and he had seven surviving children (two predeceased him).

== Discography ==
=== Albums ===
- 1966: The Duck (Mirwood Records) – peaked at #85 Pop, #8 R&B

=== Singles ===
Earl Nelson and The Pelicans

- 1957: "Oh Gee Oh Golly" / "I Bow To You" (Class 209)

Earl Nelson

- 1959: "No Time To Cry" / "Come On" (Ebb 164)

Chip Nelson

- 1960: "Honey For Sale" / "Quiet As It's Kept" (Edsel 783)

Earl Cosby

- 1965: "Ooh Honey Baby" / "I'll Be There" (Mira 204)
- 1966: "Land Of A 1,000 Dances" / "Ooh Honey Baby (Mirwood 5515)

Jackie Lee

- 1965: "The Duck" / "Let Your Conscience Be Your Guide" (Mirwood 5502) – peaked at #14 Pop, #4 R&B
- 1966: "Your P-E-R-S-O-N-A-L-I-T-Y" / "Try My Method" (Mirwood 5509)
- 1966: "The Shotgun And The Duck" / "Do The Temptation Walk" (Mirwood 5510)
- 1966: "Would You Believe" / "You're Everything" (Mirwood 5519)
- 1966: "Oh, My Darlin'" / "Don't Be Ashamed" (Mirwood 5527)
- 1967: "Glory Of Love" / "Bring It Home" (Keymen 109)
- 1968: "African Boo-Ga-Loo" / "Bring It Home" (Keymen 114) – peaked at #43 R&B
- 1968: "Darkest Days" / "One For The Road" (ABC 11146)
- 1970: "The Chicken" / "I Love You" (Uni 55206) – peaked at #47 R&B
- 1970: "Your Sweetness Is My Weakness" / "You Were Searching For A Love" (Uni 55259)
- 1971: "Pershing Square" / "Twenty-Five Miles To Louisiana" (Capitol 3145)

Jackie Lee and Delores Hall

- 1966: "Whether It's Right Or Wrong" / "Baby I'm Satisfied" (Mirwood 5528)

Jay Dee

- 1974: "Strange Funky Games And Things" / "Strange Funky Games And Things (Instrumental)" (Warner Bros. 7798) – peaked at #88 R&B
