= Mondo Hollywood =

- Directed by: Robert Carl Cohen
- Written by: Robert Carl Cohen
- Produced by: Robert Carl Cohen
- Cinematography: Robert Carl Cohen
- Edited by: Robert Carl Cohen
- Music by: Mike Curb (music director) & Robert Carl Cohen
- Production company: Omega-Cyrano Productions
- Distributed by: Hollywood International Pictures
- Release date: 1967
- Running time: 120 minutes (director's cut)
- Country: United States
- Language: English

Mondo Hollywood is a documentary "mondo movie" by Robert Carl Cohen, released in 1967. Filmed over the preceding two years, it was described by Variety as a "flippy, trippy psychedelic guide to Hollywood".

== Description ==
The film starts with the legend:

All persons and events depicted herein are real. Any similarity to fictitious persons or events is purely coincidental.

The film presents a series of vignettes of the more extreme aspects of life in Hollywood - and Los Angeles as a whole - of the period, focussing on "the Hollywood the public does not know". Personalities who appear in the movie include proto-hippie Gypsy Boots, stripper Jennie Lee, S&H Green Stamps heir Lewis Beach Marvin III, celebrity hair stylist Jay Sebring (later murdered by the Manson Family), psychedelic pioneer Richard Alpert (later known as Ram Dass), singer Bobby Jameson (with his then-girlfriend Gail Sloatman), housekeeper Estella Scott, actors Margaretta Ramsey, Theodore Charach and Valerie Porter, fashion designer Rudi Gernreich, artist Vito Paulekas, surfer Dale Davis, skydiver Jim Arender, and beautician Sheryl Carson. Each personality provides a narrative for their own scenes. The film also shows various social and political gatherings, including an anti-communist crusade, Grauman's Chinese Theatre, a visit to Universal Studios by Princess Margaret, the aftermath of the Watts riots, a UCLA peace rally, and a children's fashion show. Other individuals shown briefly in the movie include Frank Zappa, Sonny and Cher, future Manson Family member and convicted murderer Bobby Beausoleil, Alfred Hitchcock, Brigitte Bardot, Jayne Mansfield, Ronald Reagan and several transsexuals.

== Production ==
Robert Carl Cohen (b. 1930), who had previously made Inside Red China (1957), Inside East Germany (1959), Committee on Un-American Activities (1962), and Inside Castro's Cuba (1963), was producer, director, photographer and editor of the film. The music director was Mike Curb, and the soundtrack featured songs by Davie Allan and the Arrows, and others.

== Reception ==
The film was promoted as "starring Jayne Mansfield", who had recently died, even though she only appears in it very fleetingly. It was first shown at the Mannheim Film Festival in 1967, and was then scheduled to be shown at the Avignon Festival. However, the French government banned it from being shown, stating:

This film, in the opinion of certain experts of the Commission [of Control], presents an apology for a certain number of perversities, including drugs and homosexuality, and constitutes a danger to the mental health of the public by its visual aggressivity and the psychology of its editing. The Commission proposes, therefore, its total interdiction.

The ban was later lifted. In 1978, when Mike Curb was running for election as lieutenant governor of California, his opponent, the incumbent Mervyn M. Dymally, claimed that the film was "pornographic" and that Curb "sang falsetto in a bath tub scene with two lesbians". Curb denied participating in the film, but accepted that he had provided music for it after the filming had been completed. Mike Qualls, editor of the Los Angeles Herald Examiner, stated that "Nothing in the entire 88 minute film could be described as pornographic". Curb won the election.

The film was later described as a "cult classic ... [which] captures the underside of Hollywood by documenting a moment in time ... when an inquisitive trust in the unknown was paramount, hope for the future was tangible and life was worth living on the fringe." A re-edited and expanded "director's cut" version was premiered at the Moondance Film Festival on 10 June 2006.

== See also ==
- List of American films of 1967
