= Western Movies =

Single by The Olympics

Single by The Olympics
- B-side: "Well!"
- Released: June 1958
- Genre: Rhythm and blues
- Length: 2:22
- Label: Demon
- Songwriters: Cliff Goldsmith, Fred Sledge Smith

The Olympics singles chronology
"I Can Tell" (1956)	"Western Movies" (1958)	"(I Wanna) Dance with the Teacher" (1958)

"Western Movies" is a song written by Cliff Goldsmith and Fred Sledge Smith and performed by The Olympics. It reached #7 on the U.S. R&B chart, #8 on the U.S. pop chart, #4 on Canada's CHUM Chart, and #12 on the UK Singles Chart in 1958.

== Other versions ==
- Johnny Worth released a version of the song as a single in 1958, but it did not chart.
- John Lennon recorded a version of the B-side "Well!" on February 16, 1971, during the recordings of his album Imagine (John Lennon album). It wasn't released until 2018.
- Michael Martin Murphey released a version of the song coupled with "Another Cheap Western" on his 1979 album Peaks, Valleys, Honky Tonks & Alleys.
- Jive Bunny and the Mastermixers released a version of the song on their 2000 album The Songs of Rodgers & Hammerstein.
- Ray Stevens released a version of the song on his 2012 album Encyclopedia of Recorded Comedy Music.
