= Cliff Goldsmith =

American composer and music producer

- Born: 10 May 1925; Watts, Los Angeles
- Died: 14 June 1991 (age 66) California
- Genre: Various
- Occupations: Songwriter, music producer
- Years active: Late 1950s – early 1980s

Cliff Goldsmith was an American composer and music producer who had success in the late 1950s and 1960s.

== Background ==
Cliff Goldsmith was born on 10 May 1925 in Watts and went to school there, graduating from USC. He saw active service during WWII. He entered into music production and co-produced The Olympics, an R&B Group with Fred Smith. Songs he co-wrote include, "Hully Gully" and "Western Movies" etc.

He was one of the principals of Vault Records in the 1960s.

== Career ==
It was reported by Cash Box in the magazine's 30 August 1958 issue that Cliff Goldsmith had left Keen Records where he was an A&R man. He left his post to dedicate his time to his publishing and songwriting company, Smith-Goldsmith.

In 1958, The Olympics came into contact with Goldsmith and Fred Smith via Jesse Belvin. The duo suggested to the group that they record "Western Movies". The song made the Top 20 on LA's top 20 on KFWB. It also got to the national Top Ten in September. They also wrote "(I Wanna) Dance with the Teacher" and "Hully Gully" which were hits for the Olympics.

Goldsmith and Smith co-wrote "Patti Ann" which became a hit for Johnny Crawford in 1961, making it to no. 43 nationally.

Goldsmith produced "Call Me" for The Chambers Brothers, an original composition written by Joe and Willie of the group. "Call Me" was performed on Hollywood a Go Go on 26 June 1965.

Goldsmith and fellow Vault Records principals, Ralph Kaffel and Jack Lewerke were pictured with Bell Records president Larry Utal as they were sealing a deal for Vault product to be distributed by Bell worldwide, on the Taurus and Elkay labels.

Goldsmith produced both sides of the Leon Haywood single, "Baby Reconsider" / "Goin' Back To New Orleans" that was released in 1967.

Cliff Goldsmith retired in the early 1980s. However, he did work for a period of time within the music industry as a consultant after his retirement.

== Death ==
Goldsmith died at age 66 at Burbank Hospital on 14 June 1991.
