= The Olympics (band) =

American doo-wop group

- Origin: Los Angeles, California, United States
- Genre: Doo-wop
- Years active: 1957–present
- Labels: Arvee, Goldies 45, Lacoriha Records, Loma Records, Mirwood Records, PPL Records, Tri-Disc Records Inc.
- Past members: Walter Ward; Eddie Lewis; Charles Fizer; Walter Hammond; Melvin King

The Olympics are an American doo-wop group, formed in 1957 by lead singer Walter Ward. The group also included Eddie Lewis (tenor, Ward's cousin), Charles Fizer (tenor), Walter Hammond (baritone), and Melvin King (bass). With the exception of Lewis, all were friends in a Los Angeles, California, high school.

== History and influence ==
Their first record was credited to Walter Ward and the Challengers ("I Can Tell" on Melatone Records). After the name change, they recorded "Western Movies" (Demon Records) in the summer of 1958. Co-written by Fred Smith and Cliff Goldsmith, "Western Movies" made it to No. 8 on the Billboard Hot 100 chart. The song reflected the nation's preoccupation with western themed movies and television programs. It told the story of a man who lost his girl to TV westerns, and it included doo-wop harmonies as well as background gunshots and ricochet sound effects.

In 1959, the group recorded "(Baby) Hully Gully" (Arvee Records), which initiated the Hully Gully dance craze. "Big Boy Pete," which the group released in 1960, served as inspiration for The Kingsmen's "The Jolly Green Giant". Over the next ten years The Olympics recorded upbeat R&B songs, often about dances popular at the time.

In 1965, The Olympics were one of the first to record "Good Lovin'", penned by Rudy Clark and Arthur Resnick. In 1966, The Young Rascals version rose to No. 1 on the US Hot 100. Since then, many recorded versions have been made by prominent artists, including Mary Wells, The Ventures, The Who, The Grateful Dead, Bobby McFerrin and The Bobs.

Fizer was shot and killed during the Watts riots in 1965. Shortly thereafter, King left the group after his sister died in an accidental shooting. A revamped group continued to record into the early 1970s but were unable to attain popular chart success after the mid-1960s. The Olympics continued to perform on the oldies circuit in the United States and other countries.

In 1984, Rhino Records issued an album titled The Official Record Album of The Olympics, containing recordings from the group from the 1950s and 1960s. The Los Angeles Olympic Organizing Committee sued Rhino, claiming that Rhino's record could be confused with the album The Official Music of the XXIII Olympiad—Los Angeles 1984. Rhino won the lawsuit.

Walter Ward's song "Well (Baby Please Don't Go)" (the B-side to "Western Movies") was recorded by John Lennon during the 1971 Imagine sessions at Ascot Sound Studios, where multiple studio takes were attempted across two separate February session dates. One of these takes, recorded on 16 February 1971, was first officially released on the 1998 box set John Lennon Anthology and subsequently reissued on the single-disc compilation Wonsaponatime. A new remix of the same take was included on the 2018 box set Imagine – The Ultimate Collection, which also features an "Evolution Documentary" montage assembling excerpts from the session tapes of the song. Recordings from both session dates circulate on multiple bootlegs. A separate live performance, recorded in June 1971 with Frank Zappa and the Mothers of Invention, was issued on Lennon’s 1972 album Some Time in New York City and later appeared on Zappa’s 1992 album Playground Psychotics.

Eddie Lewis, tenor singer and last original member of the Olympics, died on May 31, 2017. Current and remaining members of The Olympics are Vel Omarr, Alphonso Boyd, and Samuel E. Caesar.

== Discography ==
=== Albums ===
- Doin' the Hully Gully (1960) Arvee A-423
- Dance by the Light of the Moon (1961) Arvee A-424
- Party Time (1961) Arvee A-429
- Do the Bounce (1963) Tri-Disc 1001
- Something Old, Something New (1966) Mirwood
- The Official Record Album of The Olympics (1984) Rhino 207

=== Singles ===
Year	Title	Chart positions				
Year	Title	US	US R&B	Canada	UK	AUS
1956	"I Can Tell" (as Walter Ward and the Challengers)	—	—	—	—	—
1958	"Western Movies"	8	7	4	12	12
1958	"I Wanna Dance with the Teacher"	71	—	—	—	—
1959	"Private Eye"	95	—	—	—	42
1960	"(Baby) Hully Gully"	72	—	—	—	—
1960	"Big Boy Pete"	50	10	—	—	77
1960	"Shimmy Like Kate"	42	—	—	—	—
1960	"Dance by the Light of the Moon"	47	—	17	—	—
1961	"I Wish I Could Shimmy Like My Sister Kate"	—	—	—	40	—
1961	"Little Pedro"	76	—	—	—	—
1961	"Dooley"	94	—	—	—	—
1963	"The Bounce"	40	22	21	—	—
1963	"Dancin' Holiday"	86	—	—	—	—
1965	"Good Lovin'"	81	—	—	—	—
1966	"Mine Exclusively"	99	25	—	—	—
1966	"Baby, Do the Philly Dog"	63	20	—	—	—
"—" denotes releases that did not chart or were not released in that territory.
