= Mira Records =

Mira Records was a record label founded in 1965 by former Vee-Jay Records executive Randy Wood. He also operated concurrently the Mirwood and Surrey labels. The label issued hit records by The Leaves and The Forum. It folded in 1968.
