= Bob & Earl =

American soul musical group

- Origin: Los Angeles, California, United States
- Genres: R&B; soul
- Years active: 1957–1973
- Labels: Class; Marc; Loma; Uni
- Past members: Earl Nelson; Bobby Byrd (aka Bobby Day); Bobby Relf (aka Bobby Garrett and Bobby Valentino)

Bob & Earl were an American music singing duo in the 1960s, best known for writing and recording the original version of "Harlem Shuffle".

== Career ==
The original duo were Bobby Day (born Robert James Byrd) and Earl Nelson. They had both been members of The Hollywood Flames, a prolific doo-wop group in Los Angeles, California whose major hit was "Buzz-Buzz-Buzz" in 1958, on which Nelson sang lead. By 1957, Byrd had started a parallel solo career, writing and recording for contractual reasons as Bobby Day. He wrote and recorded the original version of "Little Bitty Pretty One", and had a hit of his own with "Rockin' Robin" (1958). In 1957, Day/Byrd and Nelson began recording together as Bob & Earl, on the Class record label. However, these releases had relatively little success, and Day/Byrd restarted his solo career.

In 1962, Nelson recruited a second "Bob", Bobby Relf, who also used the stage names of Bobby Garrett and Bobby Valentino. Relf had already led several Los Angeles based acts in his career, including the Laurels, the Upfronts, and Valentino and the Lovers. The latter two groups also featured the then pianist and bass singer Barry White.

This duo of Relf and Nelson recorded several singles for different labels, before "Harlem Shuffle" in 1963. The song was written by Relf and Nelson, arranged by Gene Page, and produced by Fred Smith. It was based on a number called "Slauson Shuffletime" (named after a boulevard in Los Angeles) by another Los Angeles singer, Round Robin. When released on the Marc label, "Harlem Shuffle" became a modest hit on the US Billboard chart. However, its main success came as late as 1969, when it was re-released in the UK and became a Top Ten hit there. George Harrison is reported to have called it his favorite record of all time.

In 1964, the duo signed to Loma Records. They recorded for the label but no singles were released. By 1965, Nelson had achieved further success as a solo artist under the alias of Jackie Lee with "The Duck", a hit dance record which reached No. 14 in the U.S. When "Harlem Shuffle" became successful on reissue, Nelson and Relf reunited as Bob & Earl to tour. The duo split up for the last time in the early 1970s. Relf composed the song "Bring Back My Yesterday", recorded by Barry White on his first 20th Century Records album, 1973's I've Got So Much to Give.

== Discography ==
=== Studio albums ===
- Harlem Shuffle (1964)
- Bob & Earl (1969)

=== Singles ===
Year	Title	Peak chart positions	
Year	Title	US Pop	UK
1957	"That's My Desire"	―	―
1958	"Sweet Pea"	―	―
1958	"When She Walks"	―	―
1962	"Oh Baby Doll"	―	―
1962	"Don't Ever Leave Me"	85	―
1963	"Harlem Shuffle" (original release)	44	―
1964	"Puppet on a String"	111	―
1964	"Your Time Is My Time"	―	―
1964	"The Sissy"	―	―
1966	"Baby It's Over"	―	―
1969	"Everybody Jerk"	―	―
1969	"Harlem Shuffle" (reissue)	―	7
1970	"Pickin' Up Love's Vibrations"	―	―
1970	"Honey, Sugar, My Sweet Thing"	―	―
1973	"I Can't Get Away"	―	―
"—" denotes releases that did not chart.
