= Randy Wood (music executive) =

Randall Albert "Randy" Wood (October 10, 1929 – October 7, 1980) was an American record company executive. As an executive and later President of Vee-Jay Records in the early 1960s, he was involved in the early successes of the Four Seasons, as well as the releases of the first Beatles records in the United States. He later launched several independent record labels including Mira and Mirwood.

== Life ==
Wood was born in New York City, and started work in a record store in Manhattan before serving in the US Merchant Marine. After working for the Columbia and Folkways labels, he set up his own record store in New York in 1954. Three years later, he joined Kapp Records, working in A&R and promotion as assistant sales manager.

Randy's best friend in 1945 was Pete Seeger. They belonged to "The People's Songs" in 1945, and both were investigated by the McCarthy government. Randy was originally with Folkways records in 1949, then continued on to the below companies.

In 1960 he joined Vee-Jay Records, working as sales manager on the west coast. After his friend Frankie Valli played him a demo of "Sherry" by the Four Seasons, he signed the band to Vee-Jay, leading to great success for the group and the record company. The label also bought the US rights to UK EMI releases by Frank Ifield, already an established hit-maker in Britain, and a new group, the Beatles, which allowed Vee-Jay to release two singles, "Please Please Me" and "From Me to You". However, Wood gave up on the group when the records were initially not hits in the US, and later Beatles songs were issued by Capitol Records.

Wood became President of Vee-Jay in August 1963. At the time, in 1963 and early 1964, Vee-Jay was in "near chaos", being involved in contractual disputes both over the Four Seasons' contracts and with Capitol over the rights to issue Beatles records. Wood moved the label's head office to Los Angeles, and, after the Beatles started to become successful in early 1964, the label reissued "Please Please Me" and "From Me to You" as a double-sided single, and also released the album Jolly What!, split between Ifield and the Beatles. Early in 1964, Vee-Jay issued the album Introducing... The Beatles, the first Beatles album released in the United States.

Wood left Vee-Jay in 1965, and founded several small labels in Los Angeles, including Mira, Mirwood, Surrey and Crestview. Although the labels had some success, Wood later filed for bankruptcy. During the 1970s, he served as a licensing consultant for several record labels in Los Angeles.

He died in 1980 after a short illness, aged 50, and was buried in Forest Lawn Memorial Park, Hollywood Hills.

Randy Wood aka Randall Albert Wood is survived by daughters Michele Wood- Marotta and Karen Elliot (Karen Wood) as well as son Nicholas Wood. His oldest daughter, Anita Blanco died in 2015 and son Anthony Michael Wood died in 2019. His last wife, Rene (aka Ruth Hampton) died in 2005.

Vee Jay Records is now part of the Concord Music family.
