= The Flairs =

American doo-wop group

- Also known as: The Debonaires
- Origin: Los Angeles, California, U.S.
- Years active: 1952-1960s
- Labels: Recorded In Hollywood; Flair; Modern; Aladdin; ABC; Barclay; Loma; Felsted; Press
- Past members: Arthur Lee Maye; Pete Fox; Obediah Jessie; Joe Winslow; A.V. Odom; Richard Berry; Cornell Gunter; George Hollis; Thomas Miller; Kenneth Byley; Randy Jones; Patience Valentine

The Flairs (or Flares) were an American doo-wop group known for their 1961 hit "Foot Stompin', Pt. 1." Based in Los Angeles, they went through several lineup changes during their existence. Their notable members included Richard Berry (writer of 'Louie Louie') and Cornell Gunter, who would go on to be a member of the Coasters.

The group debuted on Flair Records which it was named after in 1953. In 1956, a new Flairs group was formed and they joined ABC Records. After they went to Loma Records and became known as the Ermines. After another lineup change they became known as the Flares.

== Career ==
=== The Debonaires/Flairs ===
Formed at Jefferson High School in Los Angeles, the group was originally called the Debonaires. The members included Arthur Lee Maye, Pete Fox, Obediah Jessie, Joe Winslow, and A.V. Odom. Winslow dropped out, leaving the group a quartet. Bass man Odom was out soon after, and was replaced by Richard Berry. Maye began putting baseball ahead of singing (he would later be a professional baseball player for the Milwaukee Braves), and the group brought in Beverly Thompson to replace him. Cornell Gunter, who had recently left the earliest lineup of the Platters, came in to make the group a quintet. Their first recording "I Had A Love" was released as by The Hollywood Blue Jays in 1953 on John Dolphin's label Recorded In Hollywood. Dolphin released another single by a different group called the Five Hollywood Blue Jays around the same time. The Debonaires made a handful of recordings on the label with no real success.

In 1953, the group signed to Flair Records, a subsidiary of Modern Records, owned by the Bihari brothers. At this point, the Debonaires changed their name to the Flairs. Although named after the label, they had little success there. They recorded several singles through 1953, beginning with "I Had a Love". The next was "Rabbit On A Log", which was credited to the Hunters, to avoid competition with "I Had A Love." More singles followed into 1954 including "Baby Wants"/"You Were Untrue" with Ike Turner on guitar. Thompson left in the summer of 1954. The group performed as a quartet, and brought in Charles Jackson as a fifth member on recordings.

The Flairs performed at the famed tenth Cavalcade of Jazz concert held at Wrigley Field in Los Angeles which was produced by Leon Hefflin, Sr. on June 20, 1954. They performed along with Ruth Brown, Count Basie and his Orchestra, Lamp Lighters, Louis Jordan and His Tympany Five, Christine Kittrell, and Perez Prado and his Orchestra.

Shortly after Thompson's departure, Berry left as well. He had been working with Arthur Lee Maye's new group, the Crowns, as well as his own second group, the Dreamers. This caused friction in the Flairs. His replacement was Randy Jones (who also did some bass spots with the Crowns). The group continued recording, with one of their singles, "Love Me, Love Me, Love Me", being credited to the Chimes. Jackson left to join the Chimes at this time, and Jones left to fill the bass spot in the Penguins. Gunter, Jessie, and Fox continued as the Jac-O-Lacs, recording for Tampa Records. The group broke up at this point. Jessie recorded one more Jac-O-Lacs single, "Mary Lou", backed by the Cadets. He got to know this group and, when a baritone was needed a few years later, recommended fellow Flair Pete Fox for the job. Jessie continued as a soloist.

=== The Ermines/second Flairs ===
With Fox joining the Cadets and Jessie recording solo (as Young Jessie), Cornell Gunter formed a new group, the Ermines, with new members George Hollis, Thomas Miller, and his cousin, Kenneth Byley. After a brief stint with Loma Records, they signed up with manager Buck Ram, and moved to ABC-Paramount Records, taking the name the Flairs. After recording for ABC a short time, they moved to Modern, then to Aladdin Records. Old Ermine's tracks continued to be released by Loma. Also, during this time, they frequently backed up Gunter's sister, Shirley Gunter.

Gunter was out in late 1957, and was replaced by Vince Weaver. The group recorded into the summer of 1958 for Ram's Antler Records. Later that year, Weaver and Byley both left the group. The Cadets were again associated with the Flairs—they had just split, and ex-Cadets Willie Davis and Aaron Collins joined the Flairs. Former Flair Pete Fox was also a member of the Cadets when they split, and he did not join the Flairs. The fourth Cadet, Will "Dub" Jones, filled one of two recent vacancies in the Coasters, the other being filled by recent Flair departee Cornell Gunter.

=== The Flares/Peppers ===
Miller, Hollis, Davis, and Collins recorded only briefly as the Flairs, before changing their name to the Flares in 1959. Buck Ram had actually proposed a different name, the Peppers. After a two-year break, the Flares began to record again. By this time, however, both of the former Cadets had left, and the group was now Miller, Hollis, Eddie King, Robbie Robinson, and Beverly Harris. This lineup recorded for Felsted Records. Then the lineup returned to Miller, Hollis, Willie Davis, and Aaron Collins (possibly featuring Harris). They recorded as Bennie Bunn and the Cadets for Sherwood Records in 1960.

At that time, Hollis left and was replaced by a former Flair, Randy Jones and Patience Valentine was added as a fifth member. Once again as the Flares, the group recorded for Jan-Lar Records. The group's lineup shifted rapidly at this point- later, Davis was out and Hollis was in. Then, Jones and Valentine were out, and Davis and Collin's sister Rose Collins were in. Rose was only in shortly, then she and Aaron's sister Betty Collins. Then, Davis was out again, replaced by the returning Vince Weaver for a short time, before Davis returned.

As the Flares, their biggest hit was the 1961 release "Foot Stompin' Part 1", which hit #20 on the Black Singles chart and #25 on the Billboard Hot 100.

In 1961, the group took Buck Ram's previous suggestion and recorded as the Peppers for Ensign Records. Then it was back to the Flares for Ram's Press Records. They alternated between the Peppers and the Flares through 1964. At that point, the group split.

== Discography ==
=== Singles ===
==== The Hollywood Blue Jays ====
- 1953: "I Had A Love" / "Tell Me You Love Me" (Recorded In Hollywood 396)

==== The Flairs ====
- 1953: "I Had A Love" / "She Wants To Rock" (Flair 1012)
- 1953: "Tell Me You Love Me" / "You Should Care For Me" (Flair 1019)
- 1953: "Baby Wants" / "You Were Untrue" (Flair 1041)
- 1954: "Getting High" / "Love Me Girl" (Flair 1028)
- 1954: "This Is The Night For Love" / "Let's Make With Some Love" (Flair 1044)
- 1954: "I'll Never Let You Go" / "Hold Me, Thrill Me, Chill Me" (Flair 1056)
- 1955: "She Loves To Dance" / "My Darling, My Sweet" (Flair 1067)
- 1955: Shirley Gunter and The Flairs – "How Can I Tell You" / "Ipsy Opsie Ooh" (Flair 1076)
- 1956: Shirley Gunter and The Flairs – "Headin' Home" / "I Want You" (Modern 989)
- 1956: Shirley Gunter and The Flairs – "Fortune In Love" / "I Just Got Rid Of A Heartache" (Modern 1001)
- 1956: Fatso Theus and The Flairs – "Be Cool My Heart" (Aladdin 3324)
- 1956: "Aladdin's Lamp" / "Steppin' Out" (ABC-Paramount 9740)
- 1957: "I'd Climb The Hills And Mountains" / "Swing Pretty Mama" (Antler 4005)
- 1959: "The Sheik Of Araby" / "Adorable" (Barclay 60165)

==== The Hunters ====
- 1953: "Rabbit on the Log" / "Down at Hayden" (Flair 1017)

==== The Chimes ====
- 1954: "My Heart's Crying For You" / "Love Me, Love Me, Love Me" (Flair 1051)

==== Cornel Gunter and The Ermines ====
- 1955: "True Love" / "Peek, Peek-A-Boo" (Loma 701)
- 1956: "Muchacha, Muchacha" / "Keep Me Alive" (Loma 704)
- 1956: "One Thing For Me" / "I'm Sad" (Loma 705)

Bennie Bunn and the Cadets

- 1960: "You Must Be An Angel" / "I'm Looking For A Job" (Sherwood 211)

==== The Flares ====
- 1960: "Hotcha Cha-Cha Brown" / "Loving You" (Felsted 8604-V)
- 1960: "Jump And Bump" / "What Do You Want If You Don't Want Love" (Felsted 8607-V)
- 1961: "Foot Stomping Pt. 1" / "Foot Stomping Pt. 2" (The Ramrocks) (Felsted 8624) – peaked at #25 on the Billboard Hot 100/ #20 R&B
- 1961: "Foot Stomping" / "Hotcha Cha-Cha Brown" (London HLU 9441)
- 1962: "Doing The Hully Gully" / "Truck and Trailer" (Press 2802)
- 1962: "Mad House" / "Make It Be Me" (Press 2803)
- 1962: "Rock and Roll Heaven Pt. 1" / "Rock and Roll Heaven Pt. 2" (Press 2800)
- 1963: "Do It With Me" / "Yon He Go" (Press 2807)
- 1963: "Hand Clappin'" / "Shimmy And Stomp" (Press 2808)
- 1963: "The Monkey Walk" / "Do It If You Wanna' (Press 2810)
- 1964: Cookie Jackson and The Flares – "I Didn't Lose A Doggone Thing" / "Write A Song About Me" (Press 2814)

==== The Peppers ====
- 1961: "One More Chance" / "A Place In My Heart" (Ensign 1706)
- 1963: "It Wouldn't Be The Same" / "Little Piece Of Paper" (Press 2809)

=== Album appearances ===
- 1989: R&B Confidential No.1 – The Flair Label (Ace Records)
- 1991: Juke Box R&B (Ace Records)
- 1999: Buck Ram's Doo Wop (Ace Records)
- 2004: Shirley Gunter – Oop Shoop (The Flair And Modern Recordings 1953–1957) (Ace Records)
- 2010: Ike Turner – That Kat Sure Could Play! The Singles 1951–1957 (Secret Records Limited)
- 2013: Dust My Rhythm & Blues – The Flair Records R&B Story 1953–55 (Ace Records)
- 2016: Richard Berry – Louie, Louie: 1953–1962 (Real Gone)
