= Shirley Gunter =

American singer

Background information
- Born: Shirley M. Gunter; September 29, 1934; Coffeyville, Kansas, U.S.
- Died: December 1, 2015 (aged 81) Las Vegas, Nevada, U.S.
- Genres: R&B, gospel
- Occupation: Singer
- Instrument: Vocals
- Years active: 1953 - 1965
- Labels: Flair, Modern, Tangerine, Tender
- Formerly of: The Four Queens; Cornell Gunter; The Flairs

Shirley M. Gunter (September 29, 1934 – December 1, 2015) was an American singer and songwriter who led one of the earliest female doo-wop groups, Shirley Gunter and the Queens, in the mid-1950s.

== Background ==
She was born in Coffeyville, Kansas; her younger brother was Cornell Gunter. The family moved to Los Angeles in 1942. Cornell Gunter was the first family member to join a vocal group, firstly being a founding member of The Platters and then, in 1953, joining The Flairs.

== Career ==
Shirley's brother Cornell persuaded the Bihari brothers, owners of Flair Records, to audition his sister, and they signed Shirley on the spot. After releasing solo singles without success, she formed a group, the Four Queens, with her friends Blondene Taylor and Lula Bee Kenney, and Lula's aunt Lula Mae Suggs.

In 1954, Gunter and Taylor worked up a nonsense song, "Oop Shoop", and the group quickly recorded it with saxophonist and arranger Maxwell Davis. Credited to Shirley Gunter and the Queens, it immediately became a regional hit, and rose to number 8 on the national Billboard R&B chart after being promoted by leading DJ Alan Freed. The song was also covered by the Crew-Cuts, whose version made number 13 on the national pop chart, and Harry James recorded a version in 1955 on his album Jukebox Jamboree (Columbia CL 615). "Oop Shoop" became the first record to be written and performed, with any degree of success, by a group of young black women", and inspired later groups such as the Cookies and the Shirelles.

The Queens recorded several more singles for Flair, and toured widely. However, their records had little commercial success, and the group split up in late 1955. Gunter toured as a solo performer with Young Jessie and the Flairs, and featured on an early Modern Records compilation LP, The Hollywood Rock & Roll Record Hop. She then became a member of the Flairs, and recorded a moderately successful single, "Headin' Home", with them. In 1958, she had a single "Believe Me" bw "Crazy Little Baby" released on Tender Records. Also in 1958, Shirley Gunter – who had been registered as legally blind by 1954, and later lost her sight completely – left the music business to marry and raise a family. Her only later recordings came in 1965, when she recorded several tracks including the single "Stuck Up", for Ray Charles' Tangerine record label.

Shirley Gunter later lived in Las Vegas, and continued to sing at her local church. In 1990, she made a rare appearance with Blondene Taylor, and the Flairs, at a Doo-Wop Society show. She died in Las Vegas in 2015, aged 81.

In the 2000s, Ace Records released a CD compilation of her recordings, Oop Shoop: The Flair And Modern Recordings 1953-1957.
