= Little Caesar (singer) =

American singer and actor (1928–1994)

Little Caesar (February 18, 1928 – June 12, 1994) was an American singer and actor. He began his recording career in the 1950s, recording for labels such as Modern and Recorded In Hollywood. He had a hit on the R&B chart with "Goodbye Baby" in 1952. As an actor, Harry Caesar was best known for his roles in Emperor of the North (1973), The Longest Yard (1974) and A Few Good Men (1992).

== Biography ==
Little Caesar was born Harry Caesar to Alex Caesar and Hattie Chambers in Pittsburgh, Pennsylvania on February 18, 1928. He had several older siblings. When Caesar was one, his mother died from meningitis. In 1930, his father moved to Youngstown, Ohio, looking for work and left Caesar and his siblings with relatives. By 1940, Caesar and his brother Richard had joined their father in Youngstown. Caesar attended Rayen High School in Youngstown. During his teenage years he was rebellious and joined the Wolf Gang, going by the nickname "Kid Wolf". He ended up in jail and was drafted into the army in 1948. In the Army, he represented Fort Ord as a heavyweight boxer.

When Caesar was discharged in 1950, he intended to pursue a boxing career, but after a disappointing match which ended in a draw, he switched careers to R&B music. Caesar moved to the San Francisco area and worked with The Peter Rabbit Trio. He later relocated to Oakland, California and recorded for the Bihari Brothers at Modern Records and John Dolphin's Recorded In Hollywood. In July 1952, Caesar performed at the 3rd Annual Blues Jubilee held at the Shrine Auditorium and presented by KLAC DJ Gene Norman. His single, "Goodbye Baby", released on Recorded In Hollywood was very successful, reaching No. 5 on Billboard's Best Selling R&B chart in November 1952. In 1953, he released singles on Big Town Records and Modern's subsidiary RPM. In 1960, Caesar and his band the Ark Angels recorded for Jack Bee Records which soon became Downey Records.

Caesar turned to acting in 1960, and until 1993, he appeared in numerous films and television shows. He appeared on the shows Julia, Sanford and Son, Good Times, The Dukes of Hazzard, and L.A. Law. Caesar appeared in films such as The Longest Yard (1974), Murder in Mississippi (1990), and A Few Good Men (1992). In between acting jobs, Caesar continued to perform. He appeared with Joe Liggins in the 1980s. In 1992, Casesar performed at the Desert Dixieland Jazz 7 at the Riviera Resort Hotel in Palm Springs, California.

Caesar was married to Marion Kane Bernot, they had three daughters: Jacqueline, Valerie, and Kimberly. He died on June 12, 1994, in Los Angeles. He is buried at Inglewood Park Cemetery.

== Discography ==
=== Albums ===
- 1983: Lying Woman... Goodbye Baby (Route 66)
- 2008: Your On The Hour Man: The Complete Modern, Dolphin And Downey Recordings 1952-1960 (Ace Records)

=== Singles ===
- 1952: "Don't Mention The Blues" / "Talkin' To Myself" (Recorded In Hollywood 233)
- 1952: "(Going Down To) The River" / "Long Time Baby" (Recorded In Hollywood 234)
- 1952: "Goodbye Baby" / "If I Could See My Baby" (Recorded In Hollywood 235) – peaked at No. 5 on R&B chart
- 1952: "Lying Woman" / "Move Me" (Recorded In Hollywood 236)
- 1953: "Here Is A Letter" / "You're Part of Me" [B-side by Red Callender Sextette] (Recorded In Hollywood 237)
- 1953: "Your Money Ain't Long Enough" / "Do Right Blues" (Recorded In Hollywood 238)
- 1953: "You Can't Bring Me Down" / "Atomic Love" (Recorded In Hollywood 239)
- 1953: "Big Eyes" / "Can't Stand It All Alone" (Big Town 106)
- 1953: "Chains of Love Have Disappeared" / "Tried To Reason With You Baby" (RPM 393)
- 1960: "I Hope That It's Me" / "What Are They Laughing About" (Jack Bee 1005)
- 1960: "The Ghost of Mary Meade" / "The Ghost of Mary Meade (Instrumental)" (Jack Bee 1008)
- 1964: "Show Me The Time" / "What Are They Laughing About" (Ride M-140)

== Filmography ==
=== Film ===
Year	Title	Role	Notes
1960	All the Fine Young Cannibals	Blues House Party Spectator	Uncredited
1970	There Was a Crooked Man...	Rioting Prisoner	Uncredited
1972	Lady Sings the Blues	The Rapist	
1972	Trouble Man	Walter - Pool Room Patron	Uncredited
1973	Emperor of the North Pole	Coaly	
1974	The Longest Yard	Granville	
1975	Farewell, My Lovely	Bartender	
1978	Casey's Shadow	Calvin Lebec	
1978	The End	Hospital Orderly	
1978	The Big Fix	Burke	
1979	Boulevard Nights	Guard in Juvenile Hall	
1980	A Small Circle of Friends	Jimmy	
1982	Barbarosa	Sims	
1982	The Escape Artist	Sax player	
1984	City Heat	Locker Room Attendant	
1984	Breakin' 2: Electric Boogaloo	Byron	
1987	Retribution	Charlie	
1987	From a Whisper to a Scream	Felder Evans	
1987	Stranded	Officer Miller	
1988	Hot to Trot	Gideon Cole	
1989	Ghetto Blaster	Mr. Dobson	
1989	Homer and Eddie	Street Person	
1990	Bird on a Wire	Marvin	
1992	Roadside Prophets	Jesse	
1992	A Few Good Men	Luther	
1993	Josh and S.A.M.	Father on Bus	(final film role)

=== Television ===
Year	Title	Role	Notes
1969	Julia	Herby the Handy	Episode: "Wanda Means Well"
1970	Mannix	Inmate	Episode: "The Lost Art of Dying"
1970	Barefoot in the Park	Jack Lewis	Episode: "Down with the Landlord"
1972	Room 222		Episode: "And in This Corner..."
1973	Roll Out		Episode: "Pilot"
1973	Sanford and Son	Homeless Man at the Mercy Mission / Burglar #1	2 episodes, Uncredited
1975	The Blue Knight	Walter	Episode: "Pilot"
1975	Baretta	Tucker / Cliff Johnson	2 episodes
1977	The Amazing Spider-Man	Cab driver	Episode: "Spider-Man"
1977	The Greatest Thing That Almost Happened	Bonner	TV movie
1977	Police Story	Henry Wiggins	Episode: "Stigma"
1978	Good Times	Mr. Clements	Episode: "The Traveling Christmas"
1979	Disaster on the Coastliner	Northbound Conductor	TV movie
1979	Hart to Hart	Lt. Doyle	Episode: "Murder Between Friends"
1980	B.J. and the Bear	Jason	Episode: "The 18-Wheel Rip-Off"
1980	CBS Afternoon Playhouse	Jack	5 episodes
1980	Angel on My Shoulder		TV movie
1981	The Dukes of Hazzard	Homer	Episode: "Bye, Bye, Boss"
1982	The Ambush Murders	Emmett Medford	TV movie
1982	Thou Shalt Not Kill		TV movie
1983	Cagney & Lacey	Fisher	Episode: "Chop Shop"
1983	Murder 1, Dancer 0	Morgue Attendant	TV movie
1983	Hardcastle and McCormick	Sid the Bailiff / Sid the Bailliff	2 episodes
1983-1984	Hill Street Blues	Charles Morris / Fred	2 episodes
1984	The New Mike Hammer	Jake	Episode: "Shots in the Dark"
1984	The Paper Chase	Evidence Room Clerk	Epísode: "Burden of Proof"
1985	MacGyver	Al Tennyson	Episode: "Last Stand"
1986	North and South, Book II	Joseph	1 episode
1986-1989	L.A. Law	Dwight / Pike Johnson	3 episodes
1987	What's Happening Now!		Episode: "Mad Money"
1987	The Ladies	Desk Sergeant	TV movie
1989	Alien Nation	Man Buying Car	Episode: "The Night of the Screams"
1990	Murder in Mississippi	Hollis Watkins	TV movie
1993	Evening Shade	Repairman	Episode: "They Can't Take That Away from Me"
