= Young Jessie =

American singer (1936–2020)

- Also known as: Obie Jessie
- Born: Obediah Donnell Jessie; December 28, 1936; Lincoln Manor, Dallas, Texas, United States
- Died: April 27, 2020 (aged 83)
- Genres: R&B; soul; jazz; rock and roll; jump blues
- Occupations: Singer, songwriter
- Years active: 1953–2020
- Labels: Modern, Atco, Capitol, Mercury, Jazz Family
- Formerly of: The Flairs; The Coasters

Obediah Donnell "Obie" Jessie (December 28, 1936 – April 27, 2020) was an American R&B, rock and roll and jazz singer and songwriter. He recorded as Young Jessie in the 1950s and 1960s, and was known for his solo career, work with The Flairs and a brief stint in The Coasters. He later performed and recorded jazz as Obie Jessie.

== Early life ==
Jessie's father was a cook but had no musical background. His mother, Malinda (née Harris) was very musical, playing piano and other instruments; she had a brief musical career under the name Plunky Harris. On his mother's side of the family, Jessie was also kin to the blues musician, Blind Lemon Jefferson.

== Early career ==
In 1946, he moved with his family to Los Angeles, where he began studying music, and formed a vocal group, The Debonaires, which also included Richard Berry. The group recorded Jessie's song, "I Had A Love", in 1953, and the single was released under the name of The Hollywood Blue Jays. They then renamed themselves as The Flairs, and won a recording contract with Modern Records.

However, in 1954, Jessie signed a solo contract with producers Jerry Leiber and Mike Stoller, and began recording as "Young Jessie". He said: "[The name] came about because I sounded like I was forty, like ancient for a boy of 17. I had this deep baritone voice and the Biharis wanted me to get close to the rock 'n' roll market. I could have called myself Obie Jessie but I didn't want people to think I was old."

== Recordings and performances ==
In 1955, he wrote and recorded the single "Mary Lou", later covered by Ronnie Hawkins in 1959, Steve Miller Band in 1973, Bob Seger in 1976, Gene Clark in 1977, Frank Zappa in 1983 and The Oblivians in 1997. In 1956, he released "Hit, Git and Split", co-written with Buck Ram and recorded in New York City with guitarist Mickey Baker. He also briefly recorded with The Coasters in 1957, (including harmony vocals on "Searchin'" and "Young Blood"), and appeared on records by The Crescendos and Johnny Morisette, as well as being a writer for other artists' recordings, including The Chargers and Jimmy Norman. He released the single "Shuffle In the Gravel" / "Make Believe", again produced by Leiber and Stoller, on the Atco label in 1957.

Jessie then moved on to record jazz for the Capitol label, novelty records for Mercury in the early 1960s, and soul ballads for the Vanessa label in 1963, but with little commercial success. He recorded some unreleased material for Jake Porter in the 1960s. He also did an album's worth of songs owned by Harvey Fuqua in the 1970s that never got released. In 1972, he recorded a single as Obe Jessie & The Seeds Of Freedom for Stone Dogg Records.

He also formed a jazz group, the Obie Jessie Combo, which played club dates, and in 1976 became musical director for Esther Phillips. In 1982, he toured in Europe and recorded jazz in Germany, and in 1983 performed at an "R & B Jamboree" in London, where he reportedly "astonished the audience with a charismatic performance."

He also performed with Leon Hughes' group of The Coasters. As "Obie Jessie", he later released several jazz albums, including What Happened To Jr. (1995), Here's To Life (2002), and New Atmosphere (2009). He also recorded with Atlanta-based saxophonist Bob Miles, and performed on the song "People The Time Has Come" with lyrics by Nadim Sulaiman Ali.

== Personal life ==
His younger brother DeWayne Jessie became an actor, and became well known as Otis Day in the film, National Lampoon's Animal House. Two of Young Jessie's four children sang in a group called Wizdom in the 1980s.

Obie Jessie died on April 27, 2020, aged 83.

== Discography ==
=== Singles ===
- "I Smell A Rat" / "Lonesome Desert" (Modern #921) (April 1954)
- "Mary Lou" / "Don't Think I Will" (Modern #961) (June 1955)
- "Nothing Seems Right" / "Do You Love Me" (Modern #973) (November 1955)
- "Hot Dog" (Modern; unreleased) (1956; recorded this song before Elvis Presley)
- "Hit, Git and Split" / "It Don't Happen No More" (Modern #1002) (September 1956)
- "Here Comes Henry" / "Oochie Coochie" (Modern #1010) (December 1956)
- "Shuffle In The Gravel" / "Make Believe" (Atco #6101, 1957)
- "Shuffle In The Gravel" / "Make Believe" (London [UK] #8544, 1958)
- "Margie" / "That's Enough For Me" (Atlantic #2003) (1958)
- "Lulu Belle" / "The Wrong Door" (Capitol #4318) (1959)
- "Teacher, Gimme Back" / "My Country Cousin" (Mercury #71895) (1961)
- "Be Bop Country Boy" / "Big Chief" (Mercury #71985) (1962)
- "I'm A Lovin' Man" / "Too Fine For Cryin'2" (Mercury #72104) (1963)
- "Mary Lou" / "You Were Meant For Me" (Mercury #72146) (1963)
- "Make Me Feel A Little Good" / "Brown Eyes (Come On Home)" (Vanessa #101) (1963)
- "Young Jessie's Bossanova, Part 1" / "Part 2" (Bit #7464) (1964)
- "Who's To Blame" / "Beautiful Day My Brother" (Stone Dogg #801) (1972) (released by 'Obe Jessie and the Seeds of Freedom')

=== Albums ===
- Chuck Jackson and Young Jessie (Crown #5354) (1963)
- R & B Jamboree (Ace) (1983)
- Hit, Git and Split (Ace) (1985)
- Shuffle in the Gravel (Mr. R&B #1004) (1987; released in Sweden)
- Shufflin' and Jivin' (Ace) (1987)
- I'm Gone (The Legendary Modern Recordings) (Ace) (1995)

==== As Obie Jessie ====
- What Happened To Jr. (Solar #72597) (1995)
- Here's To Life (Jazz Family #101) (2002)
- New Atmosphere (Jazz Family) (2009)
