= Gaynel Hodge =

American recording artist, songwriter, and pianist (1937–2020)

- Born: January 4, 1937; Los Angeles, California, U.S.
- Died: June 3, 2020 (aged 83) Amsterdam, Netherlands
- Genres: Doo-wop; rhythm and blues; jazz
- Occupations: Musician; songwriter
- Instruments: Vocals; piano
- Years active: 1950–2020
- Known for: "Earth Angel"

Gaynel Hodge (January 4, 1937 – June 3, 2020) was an American recording artist, songwriter, and pianist. He co-wrote the 1950s platinum hit "Earth Angel", and was a founding member and musical director of The Platters, The Turks, and The Hollywood Flames.

== Biography ==
Of African American heritage, Gaynel Hodge was born in Los Angeles, California, and was involved in doo-wop, rhythm and blues, and jazz from his earliest years. He began writing songs and playing piano professionally by age 13, joining, starting, and practicing with all-vocal groups on street corners of Los Angeles.

By age 15, Hodge was a regular session musician in recording studios throughout Los Angeles, and had co-written the multi-platinum hit "Earth Angel". He went on to form the original Platters with his brother, Alex Hodge, and sang and played piano with them on their first 16 recordings.

Hodge wrote, recorded or performed with such artists as Lou Rawls, Aretha Franklin, Stevie Wonder, Johnny "Guitar" Watson, Dr. John, Ted Taylor, Little Johnny Taylor, Richard Berry, Dick Dale, Don and Dewey, The Chambers Brothers, The Rivingtons, The Olympics, Johnny Morissette, Tony Allen, and Duane Eddy.

Gaynel moved to Phoenix, Arizona, in 1974 after extensively touring with The Ink Spots. He married Margerite Ilona van Steenbergen on October 21, 1975. Hodge was a vivid part of the Phoenix music scene until moving to the Netherlands in 1999. He lived with his wife in the Hague until 2015, moving to Amsterdam, where he lived until his death.

Up until his death, he toured several months of the year throughout Europe, the Middle East, and the United States.

In his later years, Hodge played multiple styles of music and covers, depending on who was performing with him. He introduced multiple generations to doo-wop and entertained millions of fans throughout the world over his long career. His production company, Earth Angel Enterprises, was instrumental in assisting up-and-coming artists.

Hodge died on June 3, 2020, at the age of 83, in Amsterdam, Netherlands.
