= Meet the Quagmires =

- Family Guy episode
- Promotional image.
- Episode no.: Season 5 Episode 18
- Directed by: Dan Povenmire; Chris Robertson
- Written by: Mark Hentemann
- Production code: 5ACX13
- Original air date: May 20, 2007

Guest appearances
- Luke Adams; Alexandra Breckenridge as Molly Ringwald; Jeff Bergman as Joe Piscopo; Adam Carolla as Death; Beth Littleford; Will Sasso

Episode chronology
← Previous "It Takes a Village Idiot, and I Married One"	Next → "Blue Harvest"
- Family Guy season 5

"Meet the Quagmires" is the 18th and final episode of the fifth season of the animated comedy series Family Guy. It originally aired on Fox on May 20, 2007. The episode features Peter after he goes back in time to live the single life a little longer, before he meets future wife Lois. This causes Quagmire to make his own move on Lois, and they ultimately end up marrying and having children; Peter is horrified by this "alternate timeline" and resolves to go back in time again and set things right.

The episode was written by Mark Hentemann and directed by Dan Povenmire and Chris Robertson. It received mostly positive reviews from critics for its storyline and many cultural references. According to Nielsen ratings, it was viewed in 9.1 million homes in its original airing. The episode featured guest performances by Luke Adams, Jeff Bergman, Adam Carolla, Beth Littleford and Will Sasso, along with several recurring guest voice actors for the series.

== Plot ==
After hearing Quagmire brag about his sexual exploits, Peter feels that he has missed out on enjoying the single lifestyle. Death is summoned to The Drunken Clam on a false alarm (thinking that Horace had died), and decides to grant Peter's wish by sending him, along with Brian, back to 1984 for one night. He notices his friend Cleveland, in his '80s look, who high-fives him around the pool. He then sees 18-year-old Lois Pewterschmidt walking around the country club pool, taking her high-heeled shoes off and jumping off the diving board into the pool with "Mr. Night" playing in the background, a reference to Caddyshack. Appearing to others as his 18-year-old self, Peter cancels his scheduled movie date to see Zapped! with Lois, instead accepting an invitation from Cleveland to go and party at a bar. Peter enjoys the evening, and ends up making out with actress Molly Ringwald before Death appears to return him to the present.

Back in the present day, Peter discovers that his past actions have had drastic effects on the world: he and Molly have been married for 20 years; Judd Nelson crashes at their house once or twice a week; Lois is married to Quagmire; Al Gore is now the President of the United States; Chris, Meg, and Stewie have Quagmire's chin, nose, and mannerisms; and Chevy Chase is the host of The Tonight Show. Brian explains to Peter that by missing out on his date with Lois and making out with Molly, he altered the course of history. Brian also believes that they may have also caused a butterfly effect, as shown with the additional changes to their timeline. Despite Brian's objections about leaving his idea of a "perfect" world (in which there are flying cars that run on vegetable oil and Gore has killed Osama bin Laden by strangling him with his bare hands), Peter wants to go back to the past so he can undo his mistake. This seems to be a challenge because Death can only be summoned if someone dies, and Brian believes Al Gore's universal health care and zero-tolerance gun control laws have led to people living much longer. However, when Jane Jetson suddenly falls on the sidewalk and dies, Death arrives and again grants Peter's wish to return to the past. Brian begs Peter not to go back after Death tells them Dick Cheney shot Antonin Scalia and killed Karl Rove and Tucker Carlson, but Peter does anyway, as he does not know who any of those people are. Back in the past, Peter is determined to accept Lois' invitation but repeatedly blows his opportunity and ends up repeatedly asking Death for a do-over. When Peter finally gets it right, he forgets a few hours later and parties with Cleveland instead of keeping the date. He asks Death for another chance but Death, fed up with Peter's continued blunders, tells him that he will have to fix the problem on his own.

When Peter tries to apologize the next day, Lois is still upset with him for missing their date and has decided to go to the country club dance with Quagmire. Later that night, Peter and Brian sneak into the dance to prevent the kiss that caused Lois to fall in love with Quagmire. They get in by crawling through the air vent, but crash through and accidentally injure one of the guys playing in the band on the stage, so Brian has to play guitar and sing. Peter tries to convince Lois that they belong together but she stubbornly informs Peter that he had his chance and blew it, and therefore she loves Quagmire now. Peter almost gives up. Brian notices Chris, Stewie, and Meg disappearing from a group photo, indicating that they will no longer exist. At a distance, but out of earshot, Brian urges Peter to do something that proves to Lois that he loves her. Peter gets up his nerve, punching Quagmire and kissing Lois. He asks her to marry him and she accepts. In honor of this success, Brian and the band play "Never Gonna Give You Up" by Rick Astley. The episode ends with things seemingly back to normal, with the exception of Roger from American Dad! apparently living with the family.

== Production ==
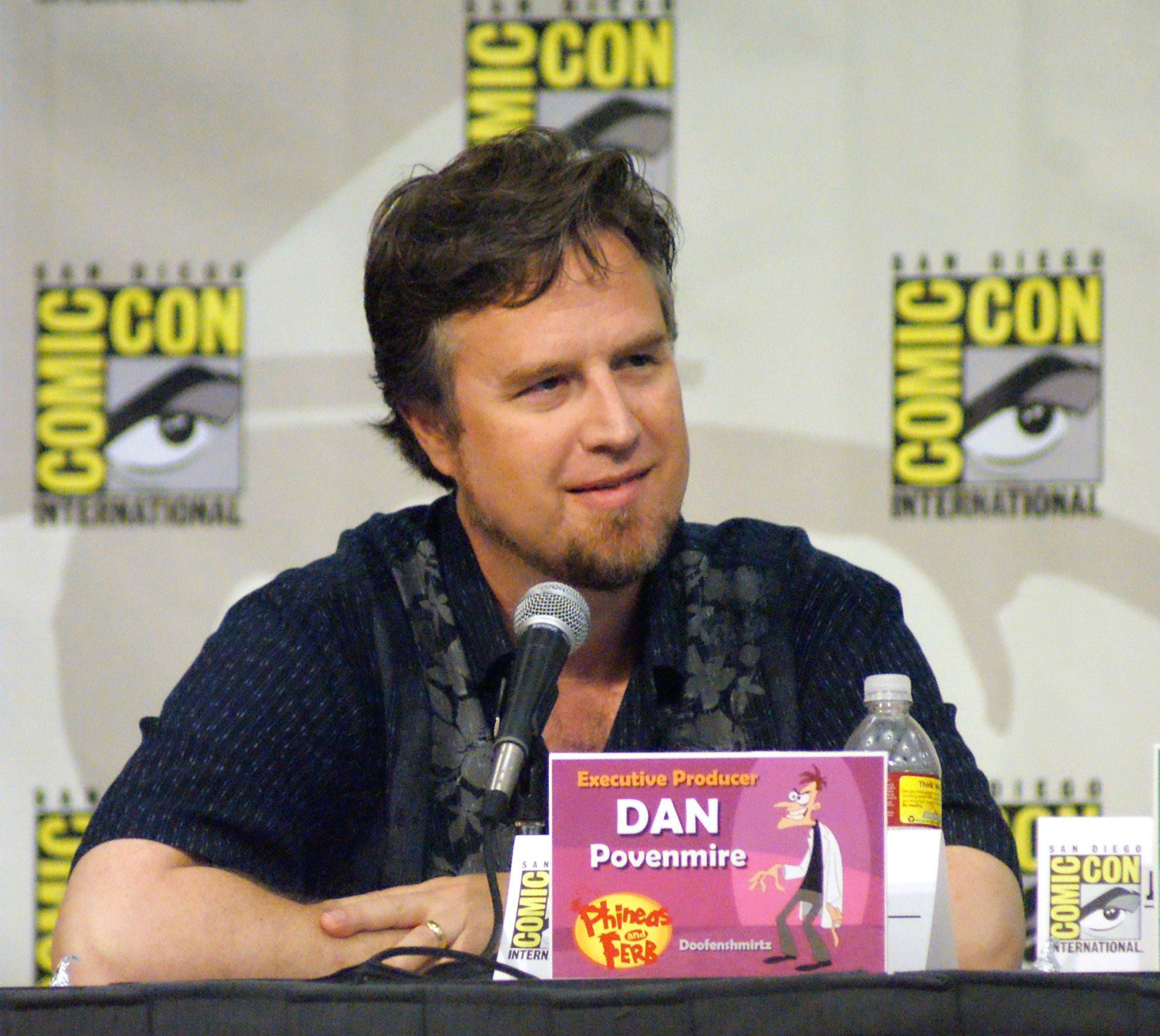
"Meet the Quagmires" was the last episode to be directed by Dan Povenmire.

The episode was written by series regular and future showrunner Mark Hentemann, and directed by Chris Robertson and series regular Dan Povenmire, who left the series after completing the episode, in order to create his own series for the Disney Channel entitled Phineas and Ferb, which has since been nominated for three Emmy Awards. Peter Shin, James Purdum and Chris Robertson acted as supervising director. Series creator Seth MacFarlane, David A. Goodman, Danny Smith, Mark Hentemann, Steve Callaghan and Chris Sheridan acted as executive producers. Alec Sulkin, Wellesley Wild, Alex Borstein and Mike Henry worked as supervising producers. Cherry Chevapravatdumrong and Patrick Meighan worked as executive story editors. The episode's original premise was based on Cleveland's divorce from his wife, Loretta, with Cleveland going on to become a hot bachelor in Quahog, causing Peter to become jealous, and desiring to become single again. Due to Warner Bros.'s ownership of Hanna–Barbera, the scene involving The Jetsons was completely reanimated by Povenmire, including the backgrounds and scenery for the sequence.

"Meet the Quagmires", along with four other episodes from the fifth season, and the first seven episodes of the sixth season, were released under the title "Volume 6" by 20th Century Fox in the United States and Canada on October 21, 2008, five months after they had completed broadcast on television. The DVD release also features bonus material including deleted scenes, commentaries, and a 'making of' featurette.

In addition to the regular cast, the episode featured guest performances by voice actors Luke Adams and Jeff Bergman, actors Adam Carolla and Beth Littleford, and comedian and actor Will Sasso. Recurring guest voices include Alex Breckenridge, voice actors Johnny Brennan and Chris Cox, and writers Mark Hentemann, Alec Sulkin, and John Viener.

== Cultural references ==
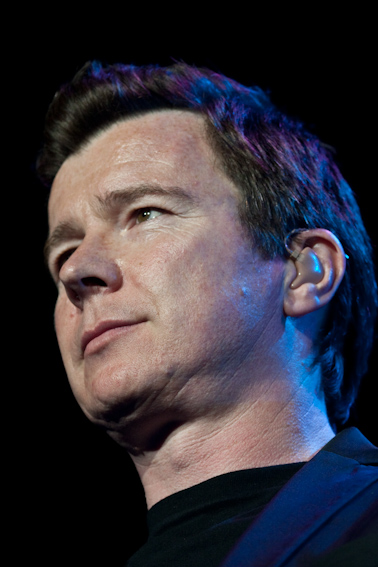
Rick Astley's single "Never Gonna Give You Up" was performed by Seth MacFarlane as Brian Griffin.

In the opening scene of the episode, Horace the bartender is suddenly knocked unconscious after falling off a ladder, causing Death to appear. After it is discovered that Horace is not actually dead, Death complains that he never likes to be too far from journalist Mike Wallace. Wallace, who died in 2012, was still alive as of the original airing date.

The Back to the Future trilogy is parodied and referenced throughout the episode, along with many other movies and famous people throughout the 1980s. Excited about the prospects afforded by his time travel, Peter tells Cleveland he intends to "raise more hell than Hellraiser". This is followed by a vignette depicting Hellraiser's Pinhead inanely pranking a woman by unscrewing a salt shaker, causing her to spill excessive salt on her food. The first scene where Lois appears at the swimming pool is a reference to a scene from the 1980 film Caddyshack, featuring the song "Mr. Night" by Kenny Loggins. Once Lois appears, she asks Peter if he would like to see the 1982 film Zapped!. Rejecting her offer, Peter decides to go partying with Cleveland instead, and play the video game Menstrual Ms. Pac-Man, in addition to making out with actress Molly Ringwald. While there, Brian gets into verbal dispute, and instructs the bar patron to meet him on top of the World Trade Center to fight him at eight A.M. on September 11, 2001. While downstairs in the alternate universe, Peter makes a reference to the Twilight Zone episode, "The Eye of the Beholder," the joke about the World Trade Center having been edited out of current airings of said episode. Returning to the present, Peter and Brian decide to watch television, and are shocked to discover that actor Chevy Chase is now the host of The Tonight Show. They also discover that former Vice President Al Gore is now President of the United States, and flying cars running on vegetable oil exist. A parody of the 1962 ABC animated series, Hanna-Barbera's The Jetsons, is then shown. In the alternate reality, Death refers to the Dick Cheney hunting accident, explaining that the "Chairman of Halliburton" accidentally shot and killed Karl Rove, Antonin Scalia, and Tucker Carlson (Brian groans that Peter and he shouldn't change his idea of a "wonderful" future, and Peter comments, "I don't know who any of those people are"). The main plot of the episode, complete with the scene in which Peter and Brian are in the living room, with Brian explaining to Peter what happened using a chalkboard, is a reference to the alternate 1985 scene in Back to the Future Part II.

In the past once again, Peter suggests to Lois that they see the 1983 film Krull instead. Later, Peter and Cleveland, dressed up as Michael Jackson in the iconic red jacket of his video clip "Thriller," dance to the Beverly Hills Cop theme. In order to make everything right about the future, Peter and Brian decide to sneak into the prom through a vent. While inside it, Peter recites a line from the 1988 action film Die Hard. The sequence that follows is a parody of the 1985 film Back to the Future. After crashing through the vent to the stage, the band begins playing "Earth Angel" by The Penguins, and, after Peter kisses Lois, Brian sings the 1987 single "Never Gonna Give You Up" by musician Rick Astley. While Brian sings "Never Gonna Give You Up", Rick Astley's cousin Marvin calls him to say he's found the "mediocre, generic sound" that Astley has been looking for, a reference to Back to the Future. In the closing scene of the episode Roger the alien from series creator Seth MacFarlane's second show American Dad! suddenly appears in the Griffin family home, inquiring about Pecan Sandies.

== Reception ==
In a significant improvement over the previous week, the episode was viewed in 9.15 million homes in its original airing, according to Nielsen ratings. The episode also acquired a 3.2 rating in the 18–49 demographic, slightly being edged out by The Simpsons, while significantly winning over American Dad!, in both rating and total viewership.

Reviews of the episode were mostly positive, noting its ability to "capture some of the appeal from the pre-cancellation days." Ahsan Haque of IGN praised the episode's story, writing that it had "a great storyline and the right combination of irrelevant and relevant jokes", giving the episode an 8.4 out of 10. In another positive review, Brett Love of TV Squad called the episode "solid," and praised the scenes set in 1984, and the alternate world. Love went on to state, "The show has lost a little of the luster that it once had, but that's no reason to count them out. There were enough bright spots to give hope for a return to that old form when season six comes around in the fall." He graded "Meet the Quagmires" 5 out of 7.

Tom Eames of entertainment website Digital Spy placed the episode at number fifteen on his listing of the best Family Guy episodes in order of "yukyukyuks" and described it as "a brilliant parody of Back to the Future". He added that "any episode that features time travel is usually a winner".
