= Earth Angel =

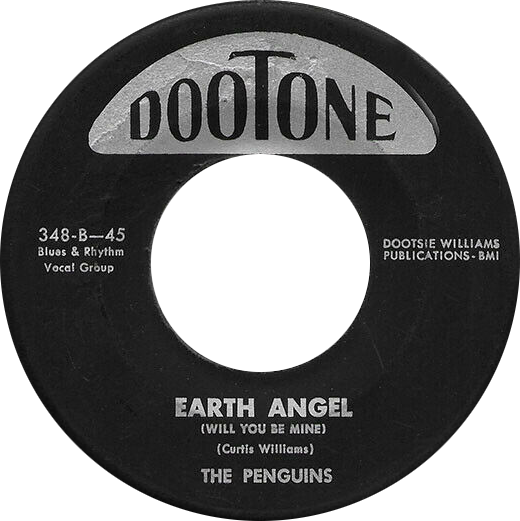
- One of side-B labels of original US single

Single by the Penguins
- A-side: "Hey Señorita"
- Released: October 1954
- Recorded: c. August–September 1954
- Genre: Doo-wop; rhythm and blues
- Length: 2:57
- Label: Dootone
- Songwriters: Curtis Williams; Jesse Belvin; Gaynel Hodge
- Producer: Dootsie Williams

The Penguins singles chronology
"Earth Angel" (1954)	"No There Ain't No News Today / When I Am Gone" (1954)

"Earth Angel", occasionally referred to as "Earth Angel (Will You Be Mine)", is a song by American doo-wop group the Penguins. Produced by Dootsie Williams, it was released as their debut single in October 1954 on Dootone Records. The Penguins had formed the year prior and recorded the song as a demo in a garage in South Central Los Angeles. The song's origins lie in multiple different sources, among them songs by Jesse Belvin, Patti Page, and the Hollywood Flames. Its authorship was the subject of a bitter legal dispute with Williams in the years following its release.

Although the song was going to be overdubbed with additional instrumentation, the original demo version became an unexpected hit, quickly outstripping its A-side. The song grew out of Southern California and spread across the United States over the winter of 1954–55. "Earth Angel" became the first independent label release to appear on Billboard's national pop charts, where it peaked within the top 10. It was a big hit on the magazine's R&B charts, where it remained number one for several weeks. A cover version by white vocal group the Crew-Cuts peaked higher on the pop charts, reaching number three. More cover versions followed, including recordings by Gloria Mann, Tiny Tim, and Johnny Tillotson.

The Penguins' only hit, it eventually sold in excess of ten million copies. The original recording of the song remained an enduring hit single for much of the 1950s, and it is now considered to be one of the definitive doo-wop songs. In 2005, it was one of 50 recordings chosen by the Library of Congress to be added to the National Recording Registry, deeming it "culturally, historically, or aesthetically important."

In 1998, the Penguins' 1954 recording of "Earth Angel (Will You Be Mine)" on Dootone Records was inducted into the Grammy Hall of Fame.

== Background ==
"Earth Angel"
"Earth Angel" is largely composed of elements from earlier doo-wop songs, among them "Blue Moon" and "Dream Girl".

The Penguins—composed of lead vocalist Cleveland Duncan, bass Curtis Williams, tenor Dexter Tisby, and baritone Bruce Tate—formed at Fremont High School in Los Angeles, California in 1953. The group named themselves after the Kool cigarette advertising mascot. Williams and Gaynel Hodge were previously members of The Hollywood Flames, where they began writing "Earth Angel" with mentor Jesse Belvin, a Jefferson High graduate. Belvin had previously had a hit single in "Dream Girl", a 1952 ballad credited to Jesse & Marvin (saxophonist Marvin Phillips). The song echoes "Earth Angel" in its melodic refrain: "Dream girl, dream girl..." Its "why-oh" hook was adapted as a background chant within "Earth Angel". The "Will you be mine?" hook was borrowed from the R&B hit of the same name by the Swallows. The Hollywood Flames were hired that year by Jessie Mae Robinson to record a demo of "I Went to Your Wedding", later recorded by Patti Page. Hodge later noted that the group lifted the bridge from that song for "Earth Angel". The song also contains elements of the Flames' 1953 recording of "I Know" in its piano introduction and chord progressions, which were closely based on the Rodgers & Hart standard "Blue Moon". Williams reportedly wrote the song for his wife, Marlene, and Duncan rewrote the melody, as he disliked the original.

"Earth Angel" was recorded as a literal garage demo—it was recorded in a home garage at the Los Angeles home of Ted Brinson (a relative of Williams who had played bass for the Jimmie Lunceford and Andy Kirk bands). The home was located at 2190 West 30th Street in South Central Los Angeles. The garage was used as the primary recording space of Dootsie Williams for all of his Dootone artists, and had been used to record demos for Jessie Mae Robinson. It was recorded on a single-track Ampex tape recorder, owned by Brinson, who performs bass on the track. The drums were muffled with pillows so as to not overwhelm the vocals. A neighbor's pet dog stopped many takes by barking. "Every time the dog barked next door, I'd have to go out and shut him up, and then we'd do another take," remembered Williams. Curtis Williams, in addition to singing, performed piano on the track, with an unknown drummer. Preston Epps reportedly played bongos on “Hey Senorita” (though this is unconfirmed). The song is composed in the key of A-flat major and is set in time signature of common time with a tempo of 76 beats per minute. Duncan's vocal range spans from F_{3} to G_{4}. The first five seconds of the intro are cut off of the recording by accident.

== Commercial performance ==
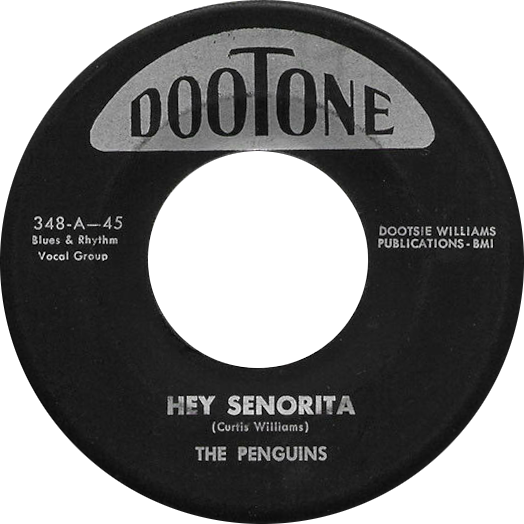
One of side-A labels of original 1954 US single

Although it was an unfinished demo, "Earth Angel" began to see immediate success. Williams carried a rough acetate dub with him to Dolphin's of Hollywood All Night Record Shop, a local record store, to gauge shop owner John Dolphin's opinion. Dolphin broadcast a late-night rhythm and blues broadcast from his store, and KGFJ disc jockey Dick Hugg was sitting in. Hugg played both sides of the single, and by the next morning, requests began coming in for the song. As a result, Williams abandoned an idea to overdub additional instrumentation and began immediate manufacturing of the 7" single to issue it as soon as possible. Still convinced "Hey Señorita" would be the hit, it was pressed to the A-side; disc jockeys soon began flipping the record in favor of "Earth Angel". The demand for "Earth Angel" nearly bankrupted Dootone; producer Walter Williams ran out of label paper, leading the single to be pressed on multiple colored labels. It made its first appearance in Billboard as a territorial hit for Los Angeles, becoming the second best-selling R&B single in Los Angeles for the second week of October 1954. It climbed to number one for the city by November 13, after which it began to grow in popularity in New York, Philadelphia, Cincinnati, Cleveland, Buffalo, Pittsburgh, and Nashville.

"Earth Angel" became the first independent label release to appear on Billboard's national pop charts. Billboard called the record a "Best Buy" for the R&B charts, and Cashbox in Canada gave it its "Award o' the Week". It hit number one in New York on November 27, and by Christmas Day the song was placing on the "Best Sellers in Stores" chart for both R&B and pop, where it debuted at number 25. By January 15, 1955, the single had advanced to the top 20 of the overall Best Sellers in Stores chart, resulting in its addition to the "Honor Roll of Hits" chart. It also reached number one on the "Most Played in Jukeboxes" R&B chart. After seven weeks on the chart, it peaked at number eight on the overall Best Sellers in Stores chart, and by February 19 had hit number one on all the major R&B charts. It remained a number one R&B hit for three weeks, before being dethroned by Johnny Ace's "Pledging My Love".

At the time, it was a rare achievement for an R&B song to chart within the top echelons of the pop chart. The Penguins were the first West Coast R&B group to dent the pop top ten. In May 1955, Dootsie Williams was presented with a gold record to celebrate the record selling 1 million copies (it was reported that nearly 200,000 copies of "Earth Angel" were sold in Southern California alone). With the popularity of the song "The Flying Saucer", the single saw revived sales in summer 1956. When the Penguins switched to Mercury Records, the label reissued "Earth Angel" in September 1956 with string accompaniment. The following July, Billboard reported that the single was again breaking out in certain markets, remarking, "This wax breaks out every summer." It made another appearance at #101 in late December 1959. Indeed, Billboard confirmed the single's enduring popularity in 1960: "The original version of 'Earth Angel,' for example, is still known to be a heavy traffic item in many areas." By 1963, Williams had told Billboard the single had passed the 2,000,000 mark, and it was reported to be the top-selling single of Dootone Records (at this period renamed Dooto). The same year, it was reported that thousands of bogus copies of "Earth Angel" were attempted to be sold by an unidentified counterfeiter.

The song has continued to sell multiple decades after its release; in 1983, for example, it was still selling thousands of copies per week around the world. According to The New York Times, the Penguins' recording of "Earth Angel" has sold over 10 million copies. Its exact figures are uncertain; the Honolulu Star-Bulletin wrote that the single has sold "perhaps as many as 20 million records, remaining one of the more popular records of all time."

== Legal issues ==
Group members later engaged in a dispute with Dootsie Williams regarding royalties. By mid-January 1955, the Penguins reportedly did not receive advances from Dootone, and problems began to arise. They hired Buck Ram, a big band-era veteran, to manage the group; he later took partial credit for the song's success despite that he only began managing the group after its release. On April 9, 1955, the Penguins signed with Mercury Records. Ram had directed the group to Mercury, slyly using his power as a representative to get the Platters, another L.A.-based vocal group, signed as well. Dootone had previously confirmed to trades that their recording contract with the Penguins spanned three years. A court decision found this contract was invalid as three of the four members of the group were minors at the time of their signing. Curtis Williams sued Dootone for $100,000, claiming damages as a result of his underage signing. Dootone countersued, claiming Mercury induced the group to break their Dootone contract and for taking the publishing rights of "Earth Angel". Jesse Belvin and supposed co-writer Johnny Green sued the group the same week for not receiving credit for writing the song; all early versions of "Earth Angel" (including the covers by the Crew Cuts and others) showed Curtis Williams as the sole author.

Dootsie Williams sued and was awarded the rights to the song in 1957 by the Los Angeles Superior Court "on the ground that Belvin and Hodge had written most of it." BMI officially lists the writers of "Earth Angel" as Jesse Belvin, Gaynel Hodge and Curtis Williams.

== Cover versions and in popular culture ==
"Earth Angel" repeatedly has been covered in popular culture. As was a common occurrence at the time, there were a number of cover versions released upon the record's immediate success. Many white artists covered the song, including Gloria Mann, Pat O'Day, and Les Baxter. The most notable of these was performed by a vocal group from Canada named the Crew-Cuts, signed to Mercury Records. Their version peaked at number three on the pop charts, higher than the original. Their version also reached British charts, a feat the original was unable to achieve. Elvis Presley recorded an informal cover during an army stint in Bad Nauheim, Germany. "The Flying Saucer" (1956), widely considered one of the early mashup songs, sampled the song without permission. Other cover versions include those by The Southlanders, Johnny Tillotson, the Cleftones, the Vogues, New Edition, the Temptations, Joan Baez, Bella Morte, Johnny Preston, Neil Sedaka, and Death Cab for Cutie.

In Sri Lanka, the popular FM radio channel Shree FM made a cover version titled "Yanna oba yanna", sung by Samitha Mudunkotuwa in the early 2000s. American rock band the Wallies released a version in 2013. Australian group Human Nature covered the song on their 2014 album Jukebox.

In addition to cover versions, the song has been employed in various film and television soundtracks. The 1991 film Earth Angel was named after the song. The song has been used in the television series Happy Days. It was featured prominently in the film Back to the Future (performed by Harry Waters Jr. as Marvin Berry & the Starlighters) as well as Superman III and The Karate Kid Part II. It is used in the jukebox musical Jersey Boys and also briefly in the film version. The 3rd act of the Family Guy episode "Meet the Quagmires" has Brian playing guitar and the rest of the band performing the song, which Lois really enjoys stating "Oh, I love this song". After the song ends, the dancers all applaud the band.

== Legacy ==
Although the Penguins never matched the success of their debut single, the song has continued to see popularity and acclaim. Cleveland Duncan, the song's lead vocalist, remarked "I never get tired of singing it, as long as people never get tired of hearing it." The song became a staple of oldies radio in the late 20th century.

An appraisal in the book Singles dubs the song "a simple but elegant recording now judged by many to be one of the finest examples of what would become doo-wop". Despite the higher success of the cover by the Crew-Cuts, the original amateur recording by the Penguins is now considered definitive. Steve Sullivan, author of the Encyclopedia of Great Popular Song Recordings, writes that the track "possesses virtually all of the qualities cherished by doo-wop lovers: melodic beauty, a shimmering earnest lead vocal, stripped-to-the-bone simplicity, and a pristine romantic innocence." The New York Times wrote that "For many the song evokes a glittering, timeless vision of proms, sock hops and impossibly young love", and the Los Angeles Times concurred, calling it a "nostalgic evocation of post-World War II youth culture." Steve Propes, an author and music historian, remarked that "It was the first of the ultra-romantic ballads that hit the nerve of teens at the time ... It stood out because of the sincerity of the delivery."

The Penguins' version was included in Robert Christgau's "Basic Record Library" of 1950s and 1960s recordings, published in Christgau's Record Guide: Rock Albums of the Seventies (1981). Rolling Stone later placed it at number 152 on their list of the 500 Greatest Songs of All Time and called it "a pivotal record in the early development of rock & roll. The artless, unaffected vocals of the Penguins, four black high schoolers from L.A., defined the street-corner elegance of doo-wop."

A 1997 listener poll by New York radio station WCBS placed "Earth Angel" just behind the Five Satins' "In the Still of the Night" in a list of most enduring doo-wop songs. In 1973, Billboard reported that many considered "Earth Angel" among the early rock and roll hits, and The New York Times stated that "its rhythmic, wailing plea to an idealized young woman captured the spirit of the just-emerging rock generation." In 2005, it was one of 50 recordings chosen by the Library of Congress to be added to the National Recording Registry, deeming it "culturally, historically, or aesthetically important".

The song's influence extends into video games, notably in the zombies mode of Call of Duty: Black Ops II (2012). The track "Lovesong for a Deadman", composed by James McCawley and featured as the loading screen and Diner area music for the TranZit map, draws heavily from the melodic structure and doo-wop style of "Earth Angel". This instrumental piece evokes the nostalgic, romantic atmosphere of 1950s doo-wop ballads, adapting it to the post-apocalyptic setting of the zombies storyline.

In July 2016, British rock band Coldplay played the song in concert in New Jersey with Michael J. Fox, star of Back to the Future, on guitar, in a tribute to the film.

== Charts ==
=== Weekly charts ===
All versions (Note: Billboard's Honor Roll of Hits measured a song's popularity versus a particular artist's rendition. It combined all cover versions of a song into one consolidated listing.)

Chart (1954–55)	Peak position
US Honor Roll of Hits (Billboard)	5

The Penguins version

Chart (1954–55)	Peak position
US Best Sellers in Stores (Billboard)	8
US Best Sellers in Stores (R&B) (Billboard)	1
US Most Played in Jukeboxes (R&B) (Billboard)	1
US Most Played by Jockeys (R&B) (Billboard)	1

Chart (1959)	Peak position
US Bubbling Under the Hot 100 (Billboard)	6

The Crew-Cuts

Chart (1955)	Peak position
UK Singles (Official Charts)	4
US Best Sellers in Stores (Billboard)	8
US Most Played in Jukeboxes (Billboard)	8
US Most Played by Jockeys (Billboard)	3

Gloria Mann version

Chart (1955)	Peak position
US Best Sellers in Stores (Billboard)	24
US Most Played in Jukeboxes (Billboard)	19

Johnny Tillotson version

Chart (1960)	Peak position
US Hot 100 (Billboard)	57

The Vogues version

Chart (1969)	Peak position
US Hot 100 (Billboard)	42

New Edition version

Chart (1986)	Peak position
US Hot 100 (Billboard)	21

== See also ==
- "Blue Moon"
- List of best-selling singles
