= From a Whisper to a Scream (film) =

- One-sheet under original title
- Directed by: Jeff Burr
- Written by: C. Courtney Joyner; Darin Scott; Jeff Burr; Mike Malone
- Produced by: William Burr; Darin Scott
- Starring: Vincent Price; Clu Gulager; Terry Kiser; Harry Caesar; Rosalind Cash; Cameron Mitchell; Susan Tyrrell; Martine Beswick
- Cinematography: Craig Greene
- Edited by: W. O. Garrett
- Music by: Jim Manzie
- Distributed by: Moviestore Entertainment
- Release date: September 4, 1987
- Running time: 96 minutes
- Country: United States
- Language: English
- Budget: $1.1 million
- Box office: $1.3 million (domestic)

From a Whisper to a Scream is a 1987 American anthology horror film co-written and directed by Jeff Burr and starring Vincent Price, Susan Tyrrell, Clu Gulager, Terry Kiser, Harry Caesar, Rosalind Cash, Cameron Mitchell, and Martine Beswick. The film features four horror stories set within the small town of Oldfield, Tennessee, each related by an elderly local historian (Price) to a local journalist (Tyrrell) who reported on the execution of his serial killer niece.

Developed by Burr, C. Courtney Joyner, and Darin Scott, all former film students, From a Whisper to a Scream was largely shot on location in Dalton, Georgia. The film was given a U.S. theatrical release in the fall of 1987 under the alternate title The Offspring.

== Plot ==
=== Prologue ===
In the small Tennessee town of Oldfield, historian Julian White relates four horror stories to local journalist Beth Chandler, who has just attended the public execution of Julian's niece, Katherine, a serial killer. The stories that Julian presents to Beth are about the history of Oldfield, which, according to Julian, is an inherent epicenter for pure evil. White's narration serves as a wraparound story for four otherwise unconnected segments set during different periods in the town's history.

=== "Stanley" ===
In contemporary times, awkward and lonely grocer Stanley Burnside, who takes care of his codependent ailing sister, Eileen. Stanley attempts to date Grace, his younger, glamorous boss. She agrees to a dinner date, but rebukes Stanley's sexual advances, after which Stanley strangles her to death. Grace's murder goes unsolved, but prior to her burial, Stanley breaks into the mortuary and rapes her corpse. Nine months later, Stanley murders Eileen in a fit of rage. That same night, a mutant zombie offspring—the product of Stanley's sexual violation of Grace's corpse—breaks into the house and terrorizes Stanley, eventually killing him.

=== "On the Run" ===
In the 1950s, Jesse Hardwick is shot and injured by ruthless gangsters over a gambling debt. He flees into the swamp, where he is saved by Felder Evans, an apparent practitioner of magic who nurses him back to health. In Felder's cabin, Jesse finds newspaper clippings that suggest Felder was an escaped slave in the late 1800s. Believing Felder has the secret to immortality, Jesse pleads that Felder make him immortal too. Felder agrees to teach Jesse certain rituals, but Jesse gets impatient and demands to be given a potion. He takes Felder into the swamp where he threatens to drown him, accidentally dropping him in the water. Jesse returns to Felder's cabin to look for the potion, when Felder returns and incapacitates him. He reveals that he already had given Jesse the life-giving elixir when he first saved him, which has given Jesse another 70 years of life. Saying it would be too much trouble to keep Jesse around, but he can't kill him, Felder starts beating Jesse with an axe. Later, Jesse's mutilated body is found on a country road. Doctors are baffled that he is alive. Jesse is left in a hospital bed with Fielder's voice echoing in his mind that he will continue living in this state for "another 70 years, or more."

=== "Lovecraft's Traveling Amusements" ===
In 1933, Amarrillis Caulfield, a young woman who falls in love with Steven, a glass-eating carnival sideshow performer. Steven's relationship with Amarrallis is met with the ire of the controlling, cruel snakewoman who owns the carnival and manipulates the performers with voodoo. The snakewoman curses Steven, making the sharp objects he ingests emerge from his skin when he touches Amarilliss. Steven flees with Amarrillis, but, under the snakewoman's curse, all of the sharp objects he has ingested over the years burst out of his body, killing him. Later, Amarrillis, now under the snakewoman's control, is put on display in the carnival as a "human pincushion."

=== "Four Soldiers" ===
Immediately after the American Civil War, Union Army soldier Sgt. Gallen and his men encounter a group of disfigured children living alone in an isolated farmhouse in an uninhabited land. The children are powerful and tactical, taking the soldiers hostage. Gallen manages to escape by killing one of the children, and finds the others outside using one of his men's dismembered torsos as a piñata. He is recaptured and comes to learn the children are all orphans of Confederate soldiers, avenging their parents while creating a cult to rule over their forgotten territory. The children bring Gallen outside, where they burn him alive, announcing that this act will serve as a new beginning for the town of Oldfield.

=== Epilogue ===
After relaying the final story, Julian is confronted by Beth, who reveals she corresponded via letter with Katherine while the latter was in prison. In her letters, Katherine claimed that Julian, who raised her from childhood, "poisoned her mind" with his beliefs that Oldfield is a place full of evil. Blaming Julian for Katherine's actions, Beth states her desire to avenge Katherine and stabs Julian in the throat with a switchblade. Before dying, Julian states: “Welcome to Oldfield”.

== Cast ==
Framing story

- Vincent Price as Julian White
- Susan Tyrrell as Beth Chandler
- Martine Beswick as Katherine White
- Lawrence Tierney as Warden
- Thomas Nowell as Andrew

"Stanley"

- Clu Gulager as Stanley Burnside
- Megan McFarland as Grace Scott
- Miriam Byrd-Nethery as Eileen Burnside
- Terence Knox as Burt

"On the Run"

- Terry Kiser as Jesse Hardwick
- Harry Caesar as Felder Evans
- Katherine Kaden as Mary Hardwick
- Gene Witham as Jack McCoy
- Tommy Burcher as Lester McCoy

"Lovecraft's Traveling Amusements"

- Rosalind Cash as Snakewoman
- Ron Brooks as Steven Arden
- Didi Lanier as Amarrillis Caulfield
- Angelo Rossitto as Tinker
- Barney Burman as No Face

"Four Soldiers"

- Cameron Mitchell as Sgt. Gallen
- C. Jay Cox as Pike
- Leon Edwards as McBride
- Ashli Bare as Amanda

== Production ==
=== Development ===
From a Whisper to a Scream was developed by Jeff Burr, C. Courtney Joyner, Mike Malone, and Darin Scott, all former film students and friends who met one another while attending the University of Southern California. Burr devised the idea of a "haunted Southern town" in which various horror stories would take place. The four each wrote screenplays for short films that would be relayed within the frame story, with the fictional town of Oldfield being the common denominator. Each of the stories was written with certain taboos being central to the plot, such as necrophilia and children committing murder.

=== Casting ===
Director Jeff Burr, whose only prior film was the American Civil War drama Divided We Fall, had limited experience in Hollywood, and met much of the cast (Rosalind Cash, Clu Galager, Terry Kiser) through friends, rather than through a traditional casting process.

In order to secure Vincent Price for the role of Julian White in the frame story, Burr went in person to Price's house with a bottle of wine (aware that Price was a wine connoisseur) and gave him the script in person. Burr would later recall,

We came bearing gifts, and wouldn't you know ... he opened the door himself when we knocked! It was a flurry of "Gee, Mr. Price, we're fans of your work ..." and "we wrote this script," and he actually invited us inside. He had every reason to ignore us, and even if it was on a polite level, he could have said, "Okay boys, contact my agent," but he was just so gracious. He invited us in, sat and talked with us for about 15 minutes, took the script, and that's how it all started.

Price—who at that point in his career was reluctant to do more horror movies—later expressed regret at taking the role in a letter to German actor and puppeteer Gerd J. Pohl, claiming his agent had misrepresented the film. Nevertheless, Burr recalls Price as "professional, gracious, and accommodating", praising his performance and his professionalism on set, despite Burr's suspicion that From a Whisper to a Scream was "the lowest budget film [Price] ever made as a professional". The film became Price's last horror role (though he would later play a villain in the zombie-themed action/comedy Dead Heat).

=== Filming ===
From a Whisper to a Scream was filmed between 1985 and 1986. During the shooting stage, Vincent Price's scenes for the framing story were the last to be filmed. Seeing footage from the finished segments helped convince Price to take the role.

== Release ==
The film was written and shot under the title From a Whisper to a Scream, but its American distributor, Moviestore Entertainment, released it theatrically under the alternate title The Offspring.

=== Critical response ===
Michael Price of the Fort Worth Star-Telegram gave the film a three out of ten-star rating, noting that the film's veteran actors "make stale baloney seem palatable," and that the film bears "no evidence of good or bad directorial style." L. Kent Wolgamott of the Lincoln Journal Star wrote that "a couple of the segments are good," but added that some of the sequences are "pretty bloody and hard to believe."

Michael Wilmington of the Los Angeles Times gave the film a favorable review, noting: "There's a mood throughout of foul things squirming up to the light. Writer-director Jeff Burr and co-writers Courtney Joyner and Darin Scott show a welcome reverence for the past of movie horror." Conversely, Lou Cedrone of The Baltimore Sun panned the film, deeming it "bad movie making" and adding that the most remarkable thing about it is that "it's been given an ad campaign."

=== Home media ===
From a Whisper to a Scream was released on DVD under its original title. The film was released on Blu-ray by Scream Factory on April 28, 2015.

== Sources ==
- Griffith, Daniel (director) (2015). Return to Oldfield: Making From a Whisper to a Scream (Documentary). Scream Factory.
