= The Ramrocks =

American band

The Ramrocks or Buck Ram's Ramrocks were an American rock band of the 1950s led by Buck Ram. They toured as the backing band of Ray Scott.

== Discography ==
- A: Hot Rock B: On The Rocks 1958
- A: The Great Pretender B: Humrock 1959
- The Flares A: Foot Stompin' - Part 1 The Ramrocks B: Foot Stompin' - Part 2 1961
- A: Lasagna B: Pasha 1962
- A: Odd Man Theme B: Benfica Press Records 1962
