= Recorded In Hollywood =

American independent record label, 1948–1959

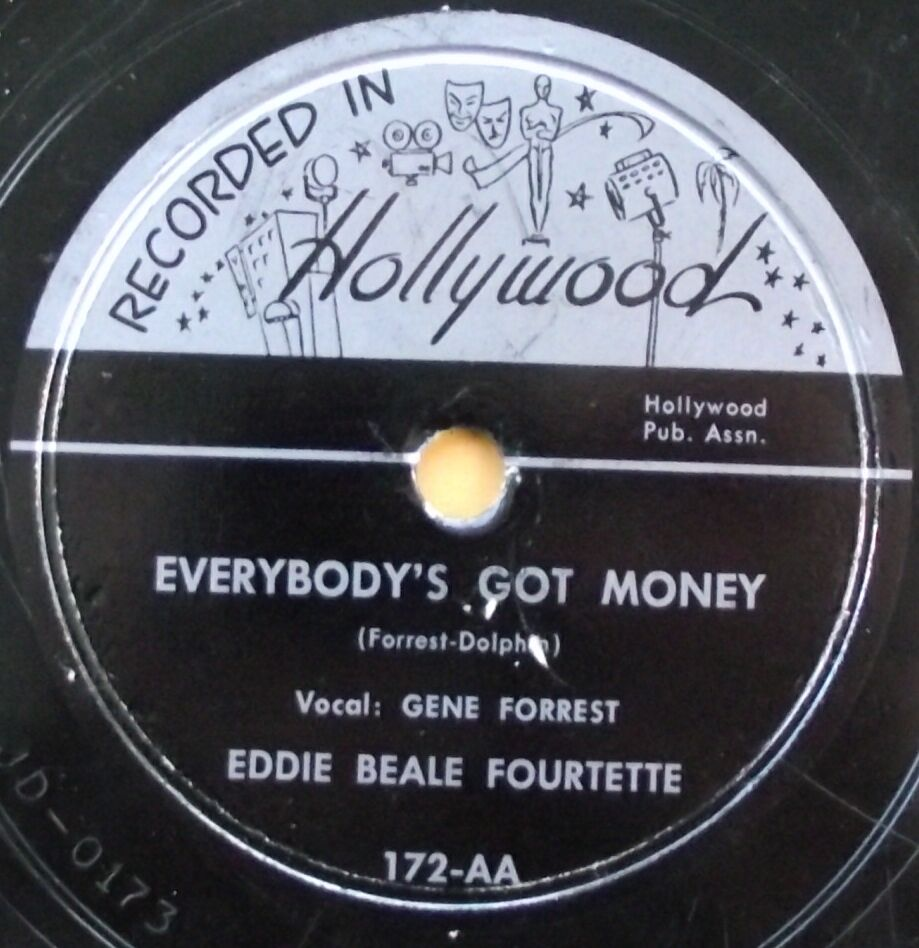
Recorded In Hollywood record label, by the Eddie Beale Fourtette featuring Gene Forrest

Recorded In Hollywood was an independent American record label specializing in rhythm and blues, active from the late 1940s to the end of the 1950s, which issued several sides by artists significant to the genre. John Dolphin operated the label out of his record shop, before selling it to Starday's Don Pierce. Pierce changed the name to Hollywood Records and began releasing re-issues.

== History ==
The label was formed by John Dolphin as Dolphin's of Hollywood, and the first issues appeared in 1948. Operations for Recorded In Hollywood, including recording and pressing, were initially an extension of Dolphin's record store located in the South Central section of Los Angeles where Vernon Avenue and Central Avenue intersect. The name was intended to appeal to African Americans, who were largely excluded from entering Hollywood itself. Red Callender served as director of artists and repertoire.

Despite releasing several successful recordings, by 1953 the label was in significant financial trouble, and it was sold to Don Pierce of Starday Records. Pierce then changed the name to Hollywood Records. Pierce found near immediate success with Linda Hayes and her song "Take Me Back", which sold 150,000 copies. Dolphin also introduced Pierce to Jack Lauderdale of Swing Time Records. It was through this contact that Pierce acquired the rights to several earlier Swing Time recordings. As a result, Hollywood sold Christmas records by Lowell Fulson, Charles Brown and Mabel Scott, which moved tens of thousands of copies on a perennial basis.

Recorded In Hollywood came to an agreement with Decca Records in January 1954, in which a share of Recorded In Hollywood's output would be released on that major label. Hollywood also issued the first Ray Charles LP from his early Swing Time sessions. Pierce ran Hollywood Records until his retirement. Although Pierce was president of Starday Records simultaneously, the two labels were run independently from each other. Hollywood ceased operations in 1959.

== Genre ==
Primarily the output of Recorded In Hollywood was Rhythm and Blues, blues, and some jazz, pop and gospel. The label's main success was with African-American vocal groups. However, other material such as country was also occasionally issued.

== Artists ==
=== Original recordings ===
- Jesse Belvin
- Red Callender
- Eddie Cochran
- Pee Wee Crayton
- Scatman Crothers
- Bobby Day
- The Gay Sisters
- Jimmy Grissom
- Johnny Hall
- Linda Hayes
- Chuck Higgins
- Smokey Hogg
- Hollywood Bluejays (predecessor of The Flairs).
- The Hollywood Flames
- Joe Houston
- Carol Kay
- Rev. G. W. Killens
- Little Caesar
- Roberta Martin
- Percy Mayfield
- Bobby Nunn
- Ernest "Tabby" Thomas
- Five Hollywood Blue Jays

=== Reissues ===
- Charles Brown
- Ray Charles
- Lowell Fulson
