= Buzz-Buzz-Buzz =

Single by The Hollywood Flames
- B-side: "Crazy"
- Released: October 1957
- Genre: Doo wop
- Length: 2:08
- Label: Ebb
- Songwriter(s): John Gray, Bobby Day
- Producer(s): John Dolphin

The Hollywood Flames singles chronology
"Peggy" (1954)	"Buzz-Buzz-Buzz" (1957)	"Strollin' on the Beach" (1958)

"Buzz-Buzz-Buzz" is a song written by John Gray and Bobby Day and performed by The Hollywood Flames. The lead vocals were by Earl Nelson, and later by Bob & Earl. It reached number 5 on the US R&B chart and number 11 on the Billboard pop chart in 1957.

The single ranked 94th on Billboard's Year-End Hot 100 singles of 1958.

== Other versions ==
- Rusty Draper released a version of the song as the B-side to his 1957 single, "I Get the Blues When It Rains". It reached #21 in Canada.
- Frankie Lymon released a version of the song as the B-side to his 1960 single, "Waitin' in School".
- Bobby Day later released his own version as the B-side to his 1963 single, "Pretty Little Girl Next Door".
- Rocky Roberts and the Airedales released a version of the song as a single in 1967.
- Shakin' Stevens and the Sunsets released a version of the song on his 1973 album, Shakin' Stevens & Sunsets.
- Jonathan Richman & the Modern Lovers released a version of the song as a single in 1978 in the United Kingdom.
- The Blasters released a version of the song on their 1980 album, American Music.
- Huey Lewis and the News released a version of the song on their 1982 album, Picture This.
- The Beach Boys performed the song live during 1984.
- Los Lobos with Lalo Guerrero released a version of the song on their 1995 album, Papa's Dream.
- Collage released a version of the song on their 1999 album, Chapter II 1999.
- The Refreshments released a version of the song on their 2008 album, Jukebox - Refreshing Classics.
