= John Dolphin (music producer) =

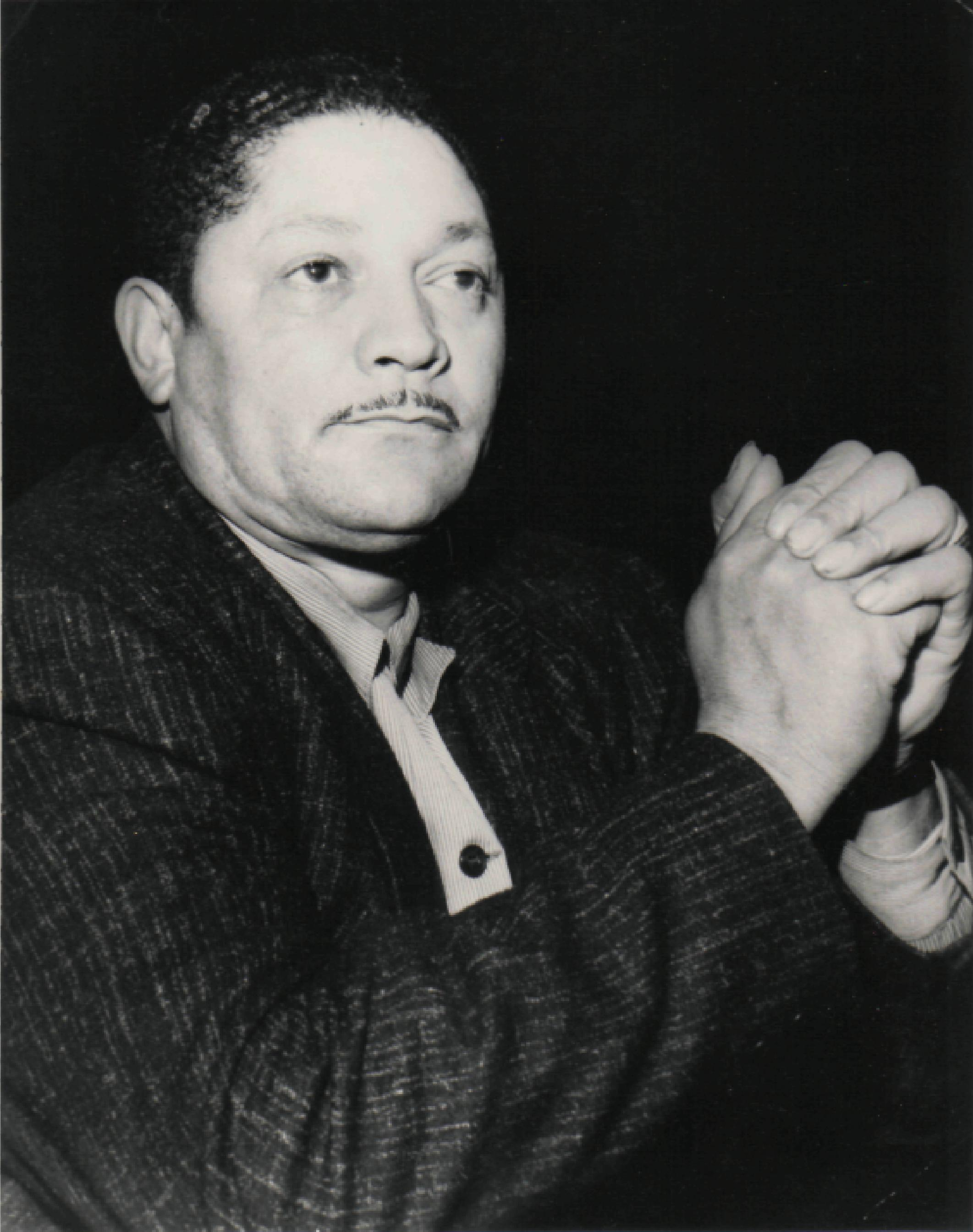

Background information
- Also known as: Lovin John, The Toast of the Coast
- Born: John Grayton Dolphin; April 9, 1902; Beatrice, Alabama, US
- Died: February 1, 1958 (aged 55) Los Angeles, California, US
- Occupations: Record store owner, music producer, concert promoter, DJ
- Years active: 1946–1958
- Labels: Recorded In Hollywood, Cash Records, Money Records, Lucky Records, Ball Records, Dolphin's of Hollywood

John Grayton Dolphin (April 9, 1902 – February 1, 1958), also known as Lovin John, was an American businessman, independent record label owner, concert promoter and music producer, who established Dolphin's of Hollywood, an influential record store that remained open 24 hours a day. Dolphin was one of the first and most well respected and successful black businessmen and independent record label owners, whose contributions to the music industry, jazz, R&B, and the formative years of rock and roll have often been overlooked.

== Early life ==
Dolphin was born in the Southern town of Beatrice, Alabama in 1902 to Lewis (Stallworth) Dolphin and Elyce Dolphin. He left Beatrice at a very young age and moved to Boley, Oklahoma, where he was raised. He later moved to Detroit, Michigan and finally settled in Los Angeles, California.

== Career ==
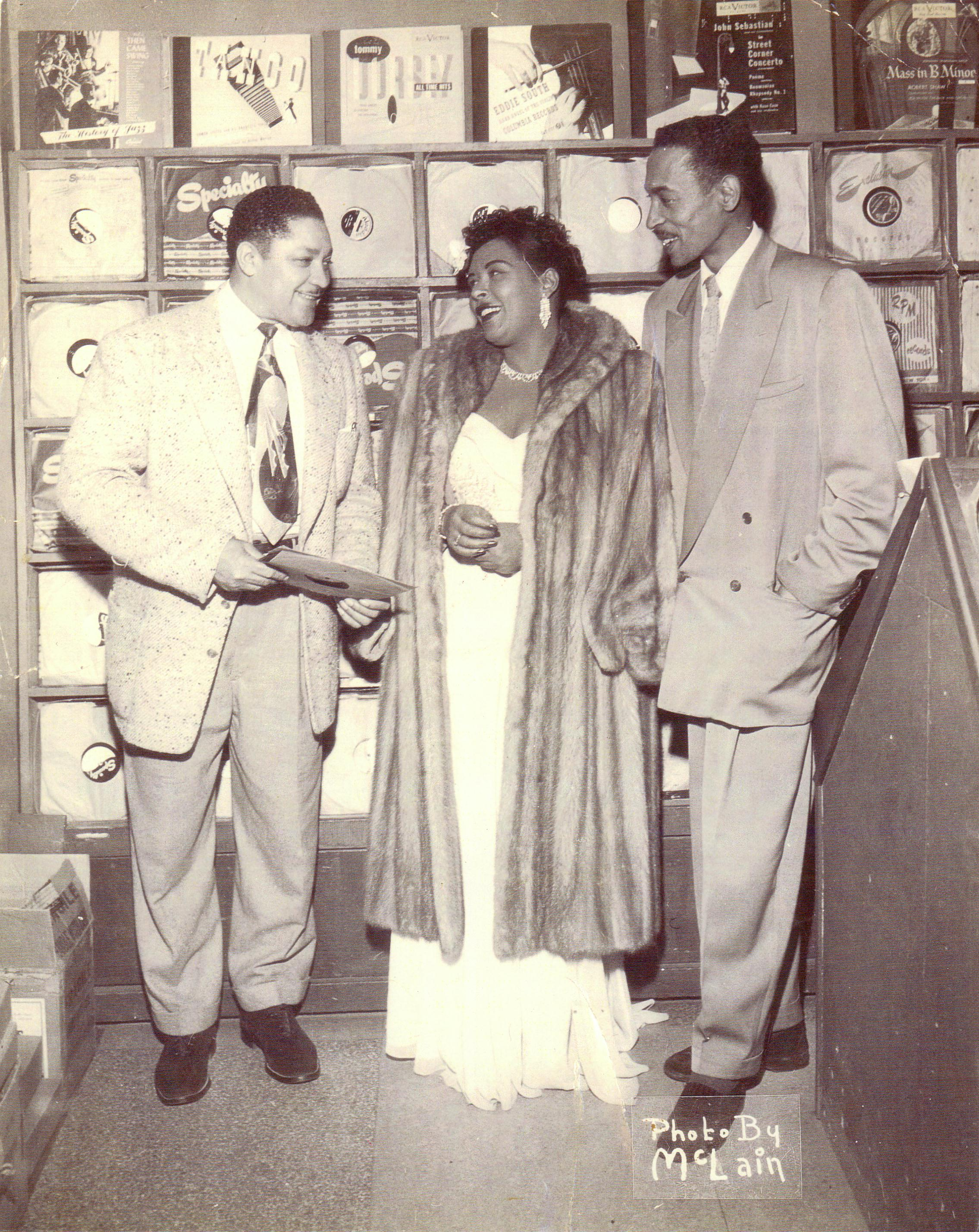
John Dolphin and Billie Holiday

=== Dolphin's of Hollywood ===
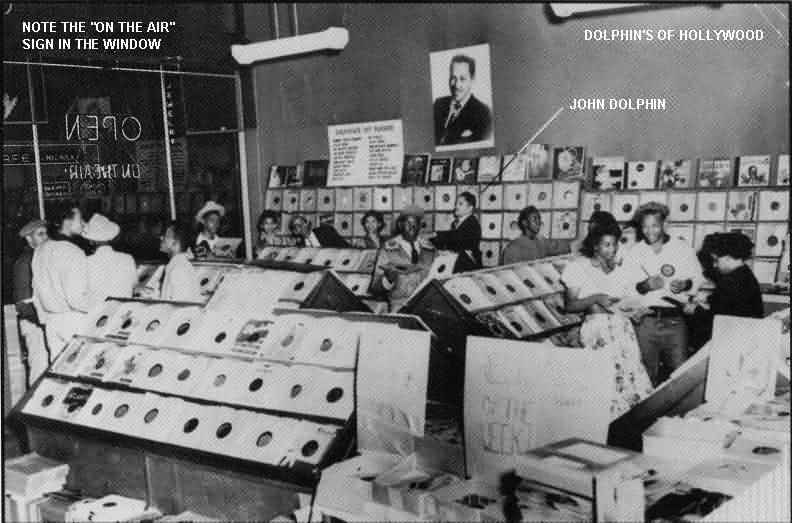
Dolphin's of Hollywood

Dolphin's record store, Dolphin's of Hollywood, was opened in 1948 on Central Avenue in Los Angeles. Central Avenue was a hub for jazz music in Los Angeles and attracted figures such as Duke Ellington, Nat King Cole, Jelly Roll Morton, Louis Armstrong, Lionel Hampton, Joe Turner, Billie Holiday, Sam Cooke and Charlie Parker.

Dolphin's of Hollywood was a prime factor in the emergence of rhythm & blues music on the West Coast, due to its sales of records and being the location of landmark R&B radio broadcasts by Hunter Hancock and Dick "Huggie Boy" Hugg. Hits like "Earth Angel (Will You Be Mine)", by the doo-wop group The Penguins, were first released during a live broadcast inside Dolphins of Hollywood. To get an audience reaction, Dolphin asked Huggy Boy to play both sides of the record over the air. Dolphin's of Hollywood record store featured live DJs, and a radio show broadcasting live over local station KRKD from inside the store's walls.

It soon became one of the most famous record shops in America. Recording artists appeared at the store and performed live on-air interviews, and greeted and signed autographs for customers.

The store's name arose from the fact that Hollywood wouldn't allow blacks to own or operate any business in Hollywood, so this was Dolphin's way of bringing Hollywood to South Central Los Angeles, as he was quoted saying "If blacks can't go to Hollywood, I'll bring Hollywood to blacks."

Rudy Ray Moore, aka Dolemite, got his start in the music business recording for John Dolphin's Cash Records label under the group name Rudy Ray Moore & The Rayettes. Eventually Moore became Dolphin's assistant, helping to run his record label and everyday activities of the busy store. While he worked at the store, Moore's songs were often playing on their own radio station. This period of employment would give way to a significant change in his career. A wino named Rico often came into the store requesting money for soup. Moore would give him money if he would perform a toast called "Dolemite." Toasts are a black tradition of storytelling, often the "tallest" tale being the best. Moore was amazed at how much the people enjoyed this routine, and decided to modify it and use it professionally in his act. This single bit of material became his namesake.

At midnight on Saturdays, over 500 people would be dancing in the streets in front of the Dolphin's of Hollywood record shop.

=== Work as record producer ===
With his own live radio show and recording studio in the back of the Dolphin's of Hollywood record shop, Dolphin was a serious attraction for music artists. His motto was "We'll record you today and have you a hit by tonight". Artists knew Dolphin would give them the exposure they needed, and on his radio show he could instruct the DJs to play the records his labels produced.

In 1950 Dolphin started his first label, Recorded In Hollywood (RIH). His first chart success came in 1951, "Once There Lived A Fool", by Duke Ellington's vocalist Jimmy Grissom. The song, penned by Jessie Mae Robinson, became the subject of almost a dozen covers, by Tony Bennett, Charles Brown, Tommy Edwards, Savannah Churchill, John Greer, Jimmy Witherspoon, and others.

He worked on other national hit songs such as "Buzz-Buzz-Buzz", by the Hollywood Flames, "The Jerk" by The Larks, and "Make me Yours" by Betty Swann. His contributions to music span from jazz to rock'n'roll. He worked with artists including Sam Cooke, Jesse Belvin, Charles Mingus, Pee Wee Crayton, Major Lance, Scatman Crothers, Harry Caesar, Tony Allen, Gene Forrest, Percy Mayfield, Damita Jo, Marvin Phillips, Jesse Belvin, Illinois Jacquet and Linda Hayes. Dolphin produced several famous records under the Recorded In Hollywood label, and eventually created other labels including Lucky Records, Cash Records, and Money Records.

Dolphin sold Money and its holdings to Don Pierce's Hollywood Records in 1956.

=== Crossover music ===
Dolphin brought fame to many underserved, talented, black artists. He is credited as being the creator and innovator of the crossover music concept, which essentially took music originally recorded by African Americans and had white artists re-record it, as during this time, most Black music was considered taboo and hard to sell to the masses. He went on white radio station KRKD and played a Black music format, marketing it to whites. This became what is known in the music industry as crossover, when a Black artist breaks through and begins selling to a much wider White audience.

=== Activism ===
In 1954, Dolphin organized a protest by 150 Black business owners and employees in reaction to an ongoing campaign of intimidation directed at interracial trade. Dolphin's of Hollywood was outselling other, White-owned stores in the city, and continued to attract White customers who spent their money not only at the store, but also in the neighborhood.

== Death ==
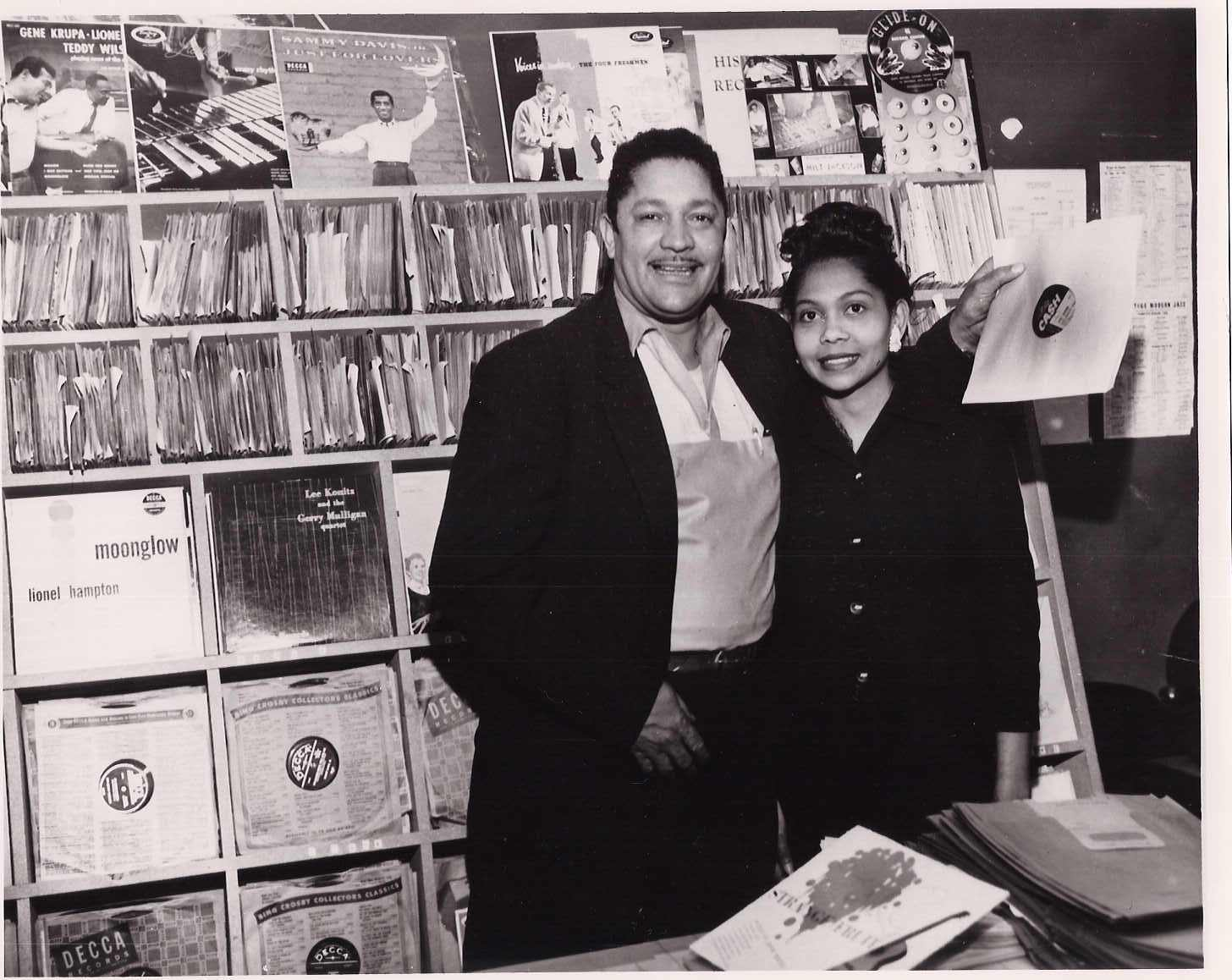
John and Ruth Dolphin

Dolphin was murdered behind the desk of his office in Hollywood on February 1, 1958, by frustrated singer and shipping clerk Percy Ivy. His murder was witnessed by teenage musicians Bruce Johnston, Sandy Nelson, and Dave Shostac, who were attempting to interest Dolphin in their music.

His wife, Ruth Dolphin, took over Dolphin's of Hollywood after his death. She died in 2005.

== Legacy ==
In 2015, a musical, Recorded In Hollywood - The Musical, co-written by Dolphin's grandson Jamelle Dolphin, debuted at the Lillian Theatre in Los Angeles. After a very successful first run, the following year the musical opened at the larger Kirk Douglas Theatre in Culver City, California, with much of the same success.

On July 28, 2016, Los Angeles City Councilmember Curren D. Price Jr. officially announced and presented the renaming of the intersection of Central and Vernon avenues to "Dolphin's of Hollywood Square" in honor and recognition of Dolphin's groundbreaking contributions to the music industry and the city of Los Angeles.

== Books ==
- Recorded In Hollywood: The John Dolphin Story
