= Five Hollywood Blue Jays =

The Five Hollywood Blue Jays were an American music group. They only made one single and it was for the label "Recorded In Hollywood" in 1952. They are not the same group as The Hollywood Blue Jays who also recorded for the same label. The Hollywood Blue Jays were also known as The Flairs.

== Discography ==
- 1952: "So Worried" / "Cloudy And Raining" (Recorded In Hollywood 185)
