= The Hollywood Flames =

American R&B vocal group

- Also known as: The Turks, The Jets, The Sounds, Bobby Day & the Satellites, Earl Nelson & the Pelicans
- Origin: Watts, Los Angeles, California, United States
- Genres: Doo wop, vocal harmony, rhythm and blues
- Years active: 1949–1967
- Labels: Atco, Selective, Aladdin, Speciality, Class Records, London, Chess Records, Ebb Records
- Past members: Bobby Byrd (lead); David Ford; Curlee Dinkins; Willie Ray Rockwell; Clyde Tillis; Gaynel Hodge; Curtis Williams

The Hollywood Flames were an American R&B vocal group in the 1950s, best known for their No. 11 hit "Buzz-Buzz-Buzz" in 1957.

== Early years ==
They formed as The Flames in 1949, in the Watts neighborhood of Los Angeles, at a talent show where members of various high school groups got together. The original members were Bobby Byrd (lead), David Ford, Curlee Dinkins and Willie Ray Rockwell. Rockwell was replaced by Clyde Tillis, and Ford sometimes sang lead. Their first paying gig was at Johnny Otis's Barrelhouse Club. They first recorded in 1950 for the Selective label, and the following year, billed as The Hollywood Four Flames, released "Tabarin", a song written by Murry Wilson (father of The Beach Boys). They later recorded another Wilson song, "I'll Hide My Tears".

== Bands and recordings ==
Over the years the group, under various names, is believed to have recorded for about nineteen different record labels, including Aladdin and Specialty. Although they had no big hits for several years, they were a successful local act in the Los Angeles area. The group also had a series of personnel changes, with Rockwell being replaced by Gaynel Hodge, and for a short while Dinkins being replaced by Curtis Williams. Hodge and Williams, with Jesse Belvin, were co-writers of The Penguins' "Earth Angel". In 1953, they released the sketch for this song "I Know" on the label Swing Time. Believed to be the first song to present the 6/8 piano-attacca known from later '50s hits such as "Only You" and "Ain't That a Shame".

By 1954, the group were usually billed as The Hollywood Flames, but also recorded as The Turks, The Jets, and The Sounds. David Ford and Gaynel Hodge recorded with Jesse Belvin and Hodge's brother Alex (founding member of the Platters), as The Tangiers, before the Hodge brothers left The Hollywood Flames in 1955 to form a new version of The Turks. He was replaced by Earl Nelson, who had previously recorded with Byrd as The Voices, and with Byrd later formed the duo Bob & Earl.

In 1957, the group - Byrd, Ford, Dinkins and Nelson - signed with Class Records, where Byrd was renamed "Bobby Day". The group recorded as The Hollywood Flames, as Bobby Day & the Satellites, and as Earl Nelson & the Pelicans. In July 1957, Bobby Day & the Satellites recorded "Little Bitty Pretty One", which was covered more successfully by Thurston Harris. Later that year, The Hollywood Flames – with Nelson singing lead – released "Buzz-Buzz-Buzz", co-written by Byrd, which reached No. 5 on the R&B chart and No. 11 on the pop chart.

Byrd (alias Day) then left The Hollywood Flames, but continued to release singles, at first as Bobby Day & the Satellites, and then as a solo performer. His greatest success came in 1958 with "Rockin' Robin". On August 4, 1958, the Hollywood Flames appeared at the Apollo Theater, as part of a Dr. Jive show. Others on the show were Larry Williams, The Cadillacs, Little Anthony & the Imperials, The Skyliners, Frankie Lymon, the Clintonian Cubs, and Eugene Church. After this, Curtis Williams quit. The new members were tenor Eddie Williams (former lead of the Aladdins) and baritone Ray Brewster who joined in 1958. (Brewster had been in the Penguins in 1956 and both Williams and Brewster had been in the later Colts/Fortunes with Don Wyatt.) Then, the whole group picked up and moved to New York, after securing a contract with Atlantic Records' Atco subsidiary.

In December 1959, they had their first Atco release: "Every Day, Every Way" (led by Earl Nelson) b/w "If I Thought You Needed Me" (fronted by Eddie Williams). Atco arranged for them to appear at the Apollo Theater to push the record (the week of December 25). Others on the show were: Lloyd Price, Tarheel Slim & Little Ann, and The Five Keys. They were back at the Apollo on February 19, 1960 for another Dr. Jive show. This time they shared the stage with Johnny Nash, The Flamingos, Nappy Brown, Tiny Topsy, The Centurians, Eugene Church, Barrett Strong, Jean Sampson, and The Fidelitys.

In April 1960, Atco released "Ball And Chain" led by Earl Nelson. "I Found A Boy" was sung by Eddie Williams and an unknown female vocalist who recorded this one record with the Hollywood Flames. At the same session with Atco, Ray and the Flames also recorded "Devil Or Angel" and "Do You Ever Think of Me". The Hollywood Flames made one record for Chess out of their Chicago studio "Gee" and "Yes They Do", released in March 1961. In 1962, Ray left the Flames and became lead vocalist of the New York-based Cadillacs.

The Hollywood Flames continued to record for several more years, with a fluctuating line-up, the only constant being David Ford. The last version of the group split up around 1967. Earl Nelson, also known as Jackie Lee, died on July 12, 2008.

== Discography ==
=== Singles ===
Year	Title	Peak chart positions		Record Label	B-side
Year	Title	US	R&B	Record Label	B-side
1951	"Young Girl"	—	—	Recorded In Hollywood	"The Glory of Love"
1952	"Baby Please"	—	—	Recorded In Hollywood	"Young Girl"
1954	"Peggy"	—	—	Decca Records	"Ooh La La"
1957	"Buzz-Buzz-Buzz"	11	5	Ebb Records	"Crazy"
1958	"Strollin' on the Beach"	—	—	Ebb Records	"Frankenstein's Den"
1958	"A Little Bird"	—	—	Ebb Records	"Give Me Back My Heart"
1958	"Chains of Love"	—	—	Ebb Records	"Let's Talk It Over"
1959	"I'll Be Seeing You"	—	—	Ebb Records	"Just for You"
1959	"Much Too Much"	—	—	Ebb Records	"In the Dark"
1959	"So Good"	—	—	Ebb Records	"There Is Something on Your Mind"
1959	"Every Day, Every Way (I'll Always Be in Love with You)"	—	—	Atco Records	"If I Thought You Needed Me"
1960	"Ball and Chain"	—	—	Atco Records	"I Found a Boy"
1960	"Devil or Angel"	—	—	Atco Records	"Do You Ever Think of Me"
1960	"My Heart's on Fire"	—	—	Atco Records	"Money Honey"
1961	"Gee"	—	26	Chess Records	"Yes They Do"
1962	"Elizabeth"	—	—	Goldie Records	"Believe in Me"
1963	"Drop Me a Line"	—	—	Vee-Jay Records	"Letter to My Love (Goodnight)"
1965	"Dance Senorita"	—	—	Symbol Records	"Annie Don't Love Me No More"
1966	"I'm Coming Home"	—	—	Symbol Records	"I'm Gonna Stand by You"
