= Richard Berry (musician) =

American singer-songwriter (1935–1997)

Background information
- Born: Richard Berry Jr. April 11, 1935; Extension, Louisiana, U.S.
- Origin: Los Angeles, California, U.S.
- Died: January 23, 1997 (aged 61) Inglewood, California, U.S.
- Genres: Doo-wop; R&B
- Occupations: Musician; songwriter
- Instruments: Piano; vocals
- Years active: 1950s–1996
- Labels: Modern; Flair; RPM; Crown; Flip; Happy Tiger; Smash

Richard Berry Jr. (April 11, 1935 – January 23, 1997) was an American singer, songwriter and musician, who performed with many Los Angeles doo-wop and close harmony groups in the 1950s, including the Flairs and the Robins.

He is best known as the composer and original performer of the rock standard "Louie Louie". The song became a hit for the Kingsmen and others, and it is one of the most recorded songs of all time. Although Berry had signed away his rights to the song in 1957, he was able to renegotiate substantial financial benefit for his authorship in the 1980s. He also wrote and released "Have Love, Will Travel" which has been recorded by many other artists.

== Early life ==
Berry was born in Extension, south of Monroe, Louisiana, and moved with his family to Los Angeles as a baby. As a child, he suffered a hip injury and had to walk on crutches until he was six. His first instrument was the ukulele, which he learned when attending a summer camp for crippled children.

Berry attended Jefferson High School in Los Angeles, and with many other students practiced singing vocal harmonies in the corridors.

== Musical career ==
Berry began singing and playing in local doo-wop groups, recording with a number of them including the Penguins, the Cadets, the Chimes, the Crowns, the Five Hearts, the Hunters, the Rams, the Whips, and the Dreamers, an otherwise all-female quartet from Fremont High. He then joined the Flairs (who also recorded as the Debonaires and the Flamingoes) in 1953.

=== With the Flairs ===
The Flairs' 1953 record "She Wants to Rock" on Modern Records featured Berry's bass vocals, and was an early production by Leiber and Stoller. A few months later, when the producers needed a bass voice for the Robins' "Riot In Cell Block #9" on Spark Records, they recruited Berry to provide the menacing lead vocal on the song – uncredited because he was contracted to Modern. The Robins later split. Three members remained with the Robins and two went to New York with Leiber & Stoller to form the Coasters. The Robins continued to record (with two new members) in California for other labels, including Whippet, Lavender, Arvee, and others.

Berry's voice was used at Modern, again uncredited, as the counterpoint to Etta James on her first record and big hit "The Wallflower (Dance with Me, Henry)" and several of its less successful follow-ups. Berry also recorded with several other groups on the Modern and Flair labels, including Arthur Lee Maye and the Crowns, and the Dreamers (who later became the Blossoms). By the end of 1954, Berry left the Flairs to form his own group, the Pharaohs, as well as continued to work with other groups as a singer and songwriter.

=== "Louie Louie" ===
One of the groups Berry played with after leaving the Flairs was Rick Rillera and the Rhythm Rockers, a Latin and R&B group. In 1955, Berry was inspired to write "Louie Louie", a calypso-style song, based on the Rhythm Rockers' version of René Touzet's "El Loco Cha Cha", as well as influenced by Chuck Berry's "Havana Moon". Berry also stated he had Frank Sinatra's "One for My Baby" in mind when writing the lyrics. One night while waiting backstage at Anaheim's Harmony Park Ballroom, Berry took the rhythm of "El Loco Cha Cha" and began to add lyrics, writing them on toilet paper.

Richard Berry and the Pharaohs recorded and released the song as the B-side to his cover of "You Are My Sunshine" on Flip Records in 1957. It became a minor regional hit, selling 130,000 copies. It was re-released as an A-side, and when the group toured the Pacific Northwest, several local R&B bands began to adopt the song and established its popularity. "Louie Louie" finally became a major hit when the Kingsmen's raucous version – with little trace of its calypso-like origins other than in its lyrics – became a national and international hit in 1963. Paul Revere & the Raiders also recorded the tune in the same studio the week after the Kingsmen, scoring a minor hit. The nearly unintelligible (and innocuous) lyrics were widely misinterpreted as obscene, and the song was banned by radio stations and even investigated by the FBI.

The song has been recorded over 1,000 times. However, Berry sold the copyright for $750 in 1959 to pay for his wedding. He said in 1993 "Everybody sold their songs in those days. I never was bitter with the record companies. They provided a vehicle for five young black dudes to make a record."

Berry continued to write and record into the early 1960s, including "Have Love, Will Travel" (which later became a local hit for the Sonics), but with little commercial success, and also continued as a performer. Other songs included "Crazy Lover", recorded by the Rollins Band and "Oh! Oh! Get Out of the Car", covered by the Treniers.

For Rhino's 1983 The Best of Louie, Louie compilation album, Berry created a note-for-note re-recording of "Louie Louie" because licensing could not be obtained for the original version. Backup vocals were provided by doo wop revival group Big Daddy. The original version was not legitimately re-released until the Ace Records Love That Louie compilation in 2002.

=== Settlement of rights to "Louie Louie" ===
In the mid-1980s, Berry was living on welfare at his mother's house in South Central Los Angeles. Beverage company California Cooler wanted to use "Louie Louie" in a commercial, but discovered it needed Berry's authorization to use the song.The company asked the Artists Rights Society to locate him, and a lawyer visited Berry. The lawyer mentioned the possibility of Berry's taking action to gain back the rights to his song. The publishers settled out of court, making Berry a millionaire.

=== Later years ===
In the early 1980s, Berry recorded a duet with his ex-wife Dorothy titled 'The World Needs Peace'. He re-recorded it a few years later in a gospel version retitled "What We Need", with his six children providing backup harmony vocals.

During the 1980s, "Louie Louie" received a number of accolades, with hundreds of cover versions issued on CD compilations and played on radio marathons. He continued to play shows and in 1993 played two sets at the 100 Club in London.

== Personal life ==
Berry married Dorothy Adams, with whom he attended high school, in 1957, and they had two children, Pam and Marcel. They divorced in 1968. Dorothy pursued a music career, recording for Garpax Records, Challenge Records, Little Star Records and Tangerine. She was a Raelette for Ray Charles until the early 1980s.

Berry had six children: Pamela, Richard Marcel, Stephani, Karen, Linda and Christy. Christy, who was born in 1969, handled his career in his later years. Marcel played bass on stage with his father in the 1980s.

== Death ==
In February 1996, Berry performed for the final time, reuniting with the Pharaohs and the Dreamers for a benefit concert in Long Beach, California. His health declined shortly afterward, and he died of heart failure on January 23, 1997. He was interred in the Inglewood Park Cemetery in Inglewood, California.

== Musical legacy ==
"Louie Louie" is the most recorded rock song of all time, and in 2003 was ranked at No. 54 on Rolling Stone magazine's "The 500 Greatest Songs of All Time".

In 2024, the Northeast Louisiana Music Trail placed a commemorative marker in his honor at the Locust Hill Baptist Church in Extension, Louisiana.

== Partial discography ==
=== Albums ===
- Richard Berry & The Dreamers (1963) - Crown Records
- Wild Berry! (1969) - with the Soul Serchers [sic] - Pam Records

=== Singles ===
Recordings with Richard Berry credited as the main artist

- "I'm Still in Love with You" / "One Little Prayer" (1953)
- "Bye Bye" / "At Last" - The Dreamers featuring Richard Berry (1954)
- "The Big Break" / "What You Do to Me" - Arthur Lee Maye & The Crowns backing (1954)
- "Please Tell Me" / "Oh! Oh! Get Out of the Car" - Arthur Lee Maye & The Crowns backing (1955)
- "Daddy Daddy" / "Baby Darling (Baby Baby)" - with The Dreamers (1955)
- "Don't Cha' Go" / "God Gave Me You" (1955)
- "Next Time" / "Crazy Lover" (1955)
- "Jelly Roll" / "Together" - with The Dreamers (1955)
- "Rockin' Man" / "Big John" (1955)
- "I Am Bewildered" / "Pretty Brown Eyes" (1956)
- "Yama Yama Pretty Mama" / "Angel of my Life" (1956)
- "Wait For Me" / "Good Love" (1956)
- "Take The Key (And Open Up My Heart)" / "No Kissin' And A Huggin'" - with the Pharaohs (1957)
- "You Are My Sunshine" / "Louie Louie" - with the Pharaohs (1957)
- "Rock Rock Rock" / "Sweet Sugar You" - with The Pharaohs (1957)
- "You Look So Good" / "You're The Girl" - with The Pharaohs (1958)
- "Heaven on Wheels" / "The Mess Around" - with The Lockettes (1958)
- "Besame Mucho" / "Do I Do I" (1958)
- "Have Love, Will Travel" / "No Room" - with The Pharaohs (1960)
- "I'll Never, Ever Love Again" / "Somewhere There's A Rainbow" - with The Pharaohs (1960)
- "Walk Right In" / "It's All Right" (1960)
- "Give It Up" / "I Want You To Be My Girl" (1960)
- "I'm Your Fool" / "In a Really Big Way" (1961)
- "My Lyin' Uncle Ben" / "I Can't Help It" (1962)
- "Everybody's Got A Lover But Me" / "What Good Is A Heart" (1962)
- "I'm Learnin'" / "Empty Chair" (1963)
- "Little White Lies" / "Monkeybuck" - with The Soul Searchers (1963)
- "Ain't That Somethin' Part I" / "Ain't That Somethin' Part II" - with The Soul Searchers (1967)
- "Thank You Love" / "Ain't That Somethin' Part II" - with The Soul Searchers (1967)
- "Jan" / "Jan (instrumental)" (1967)
- "Soulin' in C-Minor Part I" / "Soulin' in C-Minor Part II" - with The Soul Searchers (1967)
- "Something" / "Frito Bandito" - with The Soul Searchers (1970)
- "Trackin' Machine" / "Doin' It" (1973)
- "Let Your Love Show To Everyone" (with The Silks) / "The World Needs Peace" (with Dorothy Berry) (1981)

Recordings where Richard Berry appears uncredited or as part of a group
With the Flairs

- "I Had a Love" / "She Wants to Rock Me" (1953)
- "Rabbit on the Log" / "Down at Hayden's" (1953) - under the name 'The Hunters'
- "You Should Care for Me" / "Tell Me You Love Me" (1953)
- "Lonesome Desert" / "I Smell a Rat" (1954) - released under the name Young Jessie
- "Love Me Girl" / "Gettin' High" (1954)
- "Baby Wants" / "You Were Untrue" (1954)
- "This Is the Night for Love" / "Let's Make with Some Love" (1954)

With Arthur Lee Maye & The Crowns

- "Set My Heart Free" / "I Wanna Love" (1954)
- "Love Me Always" / "Loop De Loop De Loop" (1955)
- "Please Don't Leave Me" / "Do the Bop" (1955)
- "Gloria" / "Oh Ruby Lee" (1956)

With The Robins

- "Riot in Cell Block #9" (1953)

With Jennell Brown (Ricky and Jennell)

- "This Time It's Real" / "Each Step" (1954) - The Flairs on backing vocals)

With the Rams (Richard Berry, Arthur Lee Maye and Johnny Coleman

- "Sweet Thing" / "Rock Bottom" (1955)

With Etta James

- "The Wallflower (Roll with Me, Henry)" (1955)
