= Flair Records =

American record label

- Founded: 1950
- Founder: Bihari brothers
- Country of origin: United States

Flair Records was an American record label owned by the Bihari brothers, launched in the early 1950s. It was a subsidiary of Modern Records. Its most famous artists were Elmore James, who released ten singles with this label (as listed below), Richard Berry, and Ike Turner who was a session musician and also released a single on the label. Flair is believed to have issued 80 singles total between 1953 and 1955.

== Discography ==
=== Singles ===
- 1953: "South Of San Antonio" b/w "No Home For My Heart" (Flair 1000) - Roy Harris And The Magnolia Boys
- 1953: "Carroll County Blues" b/w "Begin The Beguin" (Flair 1001) - The Carroll County Boys
- 1953: "Old Trail" b/w "The Mandolin Waltz" (Flair 1002) - The Broome Brothers
- 1953: "Mexican Joe" b/w "Good Old Chlorophyll" (Flair 1003) - The Rhythm Harmoneers
- 1953: "Guest Star In Heaven (A Tribute To Hank Williams)" b/w "I Know I'm Fallin' In Love" (Flair 1006) - Earney Vandagriff And The Big "D" Boys
- 1953: "Tennessee Country Gal" b/w "Always And Always" (Flair 1008) - Jimmy Walton, The Tennessee Country Boy
- 1953: "One Man's Hell" b/w "Lover Boy" (Flair 1009) - Ted Shelton And His Bryan County Boys
- 1953: "Dirty By The Dozen (Sweet Little Woman)" b/w "I May Be Wrong" (Flair 1010) - Little Johnny Jones And The Chicago Hound Dogs
- 1953: "Early in the Morning" b/w "Hawaiian Boogie" (Flair 1011) - Elmore James
- 1953: "I Had a Love" b/w "She Wants to Rock" (Flair 1012) - The Flairs
- 1953: "Can't Stop Lovin'" b/w "Make a Little Love" (Flair 1014) - Elmore James
- 1953: "Mid Night Hours Journey" - Johnny Ace b/w "Trouble And Me" - Earl Forrest (Flair 1015) (split)
- 1953: "Crawfishin'" b/w "Route '90'" (Flair 1021) - Clarence "Bonton" Garlow
- 1953: "Please Find My Baby" b/w "Strange Kinda' Feeling" (Flair 1022) - Elmore James
- 1954: "Flying Eagle Blues" b/w "Carroll County Boogie" (Flair 1023) - Carroll County Boys
- 1954: "Baby Beat It" b/w "Baby Beat It" (Flair 1029) - Big Duke
- 1954: "Sayonara (Let's Say Goodbye)" b/w "Mia Bella Donna" (Flair 1030) - The Squires
- 1954: "Hand in Hand" b/w "Make My Dreams Come True" (Flair 1031) - Elmore James
- 1954: "Baby Please" b/w "Gypsy Blues" (Flair 1037) - Matt Cockrell
- 1954: "Night Howler" b/w "My Heart In Your Hands" (Flair 1038) - Billy Gale And His Orchestra
- 1954: "Sho Nuff I Do" b/w "1839 Blues" (Flair 1039) - Elmore James
- 1954: "Cubano Jump" b/w "Loosely" (Flair 1040) - Ike Turner & Orchestra
- 1954: "Baby Wants" b/w "You Were Untrue" (Flair 1041) - The Flairs
- 1954: "Dark and Dreary" b/w "Rock My Baby Right" (Flair 1048) - Elmore James
- 1954: "Oop Shoop" b/w "It's You" (Flair 1050) - Shirley Gunter And "The Queens"
- 1954: "What You Do To Me" b/w "The Big Break" (Flair 1055) - Richard Berry
- 1954: "Sunny Land" b/w "Standing at the Crossroads" (Flair 1057) - Elmore James
- 1954: "Daddy Daddy" b/w "Baby Darlinh" (Flair 1058) - Richard Berry and The Dreamers
- 1955: "Cuban Get Away" b/w "Go To It" (Flair 1059) - Ike Turner & Orchestra
- 1955: "Late Hours at Midnight" b/w "The Way You Treat Me" (Flair 1062) - Elmore James
- 1955: "Oh! Oh! Get Out Of The Car" b/w "Please Tell Me" (Flair 1064) - Richard Berry
- 1955: "Rock Bottom" b/w "Sweet Thing" (Flair 1066) - The Rams
- 1955: "Happy Home" b/w "No Love in My Heart" (Flair 1069) - Elmore James
- 1955: "Romp And Stomp Blues" b/w "Oh, Oh, Please" (Flair 1073) - Mercy Dee
- 1955: "Dust My Blues" b/w "I Was A Fool" (Flair 1074) - Elmore James
- 1955: "Come Back Maybellene" b/w "True Love" (Flair 1077) - Mercy Dee
- 1955: "Blues Before Sunrise" b/w "Good Bye" (Flair 1079) - Elmore James

== See also ==
- List of record labels
