= KRKD =

- Dermott, Arkansas; United States
- Frequency: 105.7 MHz
- Branding: Rock 105.7

Programming
- Format: Classic rock

Ownership
- Owner: M.R.S. Ventures, Inc.

History
- First air date: 2000
- Last air date: 2007
- Former call signs: KDTL (1998–1999)

Technical information
- Licensing authority: FCC
- Facility ID: 86857
- Class: A
- ERP: 3,000 watts
- HAAT: 100 meters (330 feet)
- Transmitter coordinates: 33°32′25″N 91°22′39″W

Links
- Public license information: Public file; LMS

KRKD (105.7 FM) was an American radio station licensed to serve Dermott, Arkansas. It was assigned the KRKD call letters by the Federal Communications Commission on November 23, 1999. The station was most recently owned by Community Broadcast Group Inc., and the broadcast license held by M.R.S. Ventures, Inc. When KRKD went off the air permanently in early 2007, it broadcast a classic rock music format branded as "Rock 105.7".

== Ownership ==
In September 2003, Jerry Russell reached an agreement to purchase six stations, including KRKD, from Delta Radio Inc. for a reported combined sale price of $1.5 million. According to FCC ownership records, Jerry Russell is 100% owner of MRS Ventures, Inc.

In June 2006, the station's owner, Jerry D. Russell, suffered a stroke. The station was being operated by another broadcaster, Hodges Broadcasting LLC, under a local marketing agreement but that operator was unable to obtain the financing to purchase the station. With Hodges gone and Russell unable to operate the station himself, KRKD went off the air for good in early 2007. In a February 2011 letter to the FCC, the owner indicated that he was surrendering the station's broadcast license as well as the licenses for ten sister stations in similar dire circumstances. On May 2, 2011, the station's license was cancelled and the KRKD call sign assignment was deleted permanently from the FCC database.

== Historic radio towers ==
In 1932, the call letters KRKD were assigned to a radio station in Los Angeles, California, that erected two broadcast towers on its roof. The self-supporting radio towers still stand atop the Spring Arcade Building near Broadway and 5th Street in downtown Los Angeles. Both bear the KRKD call sign intended to evoke the word "arcade", and are easily visible all over downtown. They once supported an AM "hammock" antenna for 1150 kHz but no longer are used. A 2014 demolition permit application to remove the towers was rejected since they are a historic landmark. The towers were subsequently painted and lighted to comply with FAA regulations.
