= Bihari brothers =

American businessman brothers

The Bihari brothers, Lester, Jules, Saul and Joe, were American businessmen of Hungarian Jewish origin. They founded Modern Records in Los Angeles and its subsidiaries, such as Meteor Records, based in Memphis. They were significant figures in the transformation of black oriented rhythm and blues into rock and roll which appealed to more white audiences in the 1950s.

== Origins ==
The brothers' parents were Hungarian Jewish immigrants from Austria-Hungary to the U.S. Edward Bihari (1882–1930) was born in Budapest. Esther "Esti" Taub (1886–1950) was born in Homonna, Hungary (now Humenné, Slovakia). They were married in Philadelphia (U.S.) in 1911. The couple had four sons:

Lester Louis Bihari (May 12, 1912, Pottstown, Pennsylvania – September 9, 1983, Los Angeles)
Julius Jeramiah Bihari (September 9, 1913, Pottstown – November 17, 1984, Los Angeles)
Saul Samuel Bihari (March 9, 1918, St. Louis, Missouri – February 22, 1975, Los Angeles)
Joseph Bihari (May 30, 1925, Memphis, Tennessee – November 28, 2013, Los Angeles)

In addition to their four sons, they had four daughters: Florette, Rosalind and Maxine, all of whom worked in the Bihari brothers' business, and another sister, Serene, who did not. Serene married the New York real estate developer Irving M. Felt.

== Careers ==
After living for a time in Tulsa, Oklahoma, the Bihari family moved to Los Angeles in 1941. Jules landed a job servicing and operating jukeboxes in the Watts district, and found difficulty in locating and stocking the blues records his customers wanted to hear. He and his younger brothers, Saul and Joe, founded a new label, Modern Records, in 1945. They built Modern into a major blues and R&B label, their first success coming with "Swingin' the Boogie", by Hadda Brooks. They bought a pressing plant and divided tasks among themselves with Jules responsible for talent spotting and recording, Saul for manufacturing and Lester for distribution. Joe worked with Ike Turner as a talent scout in the Memphis area discovering Johnny "Guitar" Watson and B.B. King among others.

In the early 1950s, the Biharis launched several subsidiaries: RPM Records, Flair Records, and Meteor Records which was based in Memphis in 1952 which Lester Bihari headed. Saul Bihari founded and ran the short-lived (February to October 1952) 'Rhythm And Blues' Records. Artists on the Biharis' labels included B.B. King, Elmore James, John Lee Hooker, Etta James, Lightnin' Hopkins, Lowell Fulson, Rufus Thomas, Donna Hightower and Charlie Feathers.

The companies stayed small and were personally run. B.B. King has said that he always felt the brothers were accessible: "The company was never bigger than the artist. I could always talk to them."

Later they launched more subsidiaries: Crown Records (featuring artists such as Howlin' Wolf, Elmore James, Johnny Cole, Vic Damone, Trini Lopez with Johnny Torres, Jerry Cole, the Dave Clark Five) and United/Superior Records. In the 1960s, they launched a subsidiary, Yuletide Records, which specialized in Christmas records (mostly with Johnny Cole and the Robert Evans Chorus).

In the mid-1960s, Modern Records entered bankruptcy and ceased operating but the catalogue followed the management into what would become Kent Records. In the mid-1980s, after the deaths of Saul, Lester and Jules Bihari, the label's catalog was licensed to Ace Records and purchased by a consortium led by Ace in the 1991.

The Bihari Brothers appear as characters in the 2019 Netflix film Dolemite Is My Name: Aleksandar Filimonovic plays Joe, Ivo Nandi plays Julius, Michael Peter Bolus portrays Lester, and Kazy Tauginas portrays Saul.

== Pseudonyms and royalties ==
Though they were not songwriters, the Biharis often purchased or claimed co-authorship of songs that appeared on their labels, taking songwriting royalties for themselves in addition to their other sources of income.

Sometimes these songs were older standards renamed. B.B. King's rendition of "Rock Me Baby" was such a tune; anonymous jams, as with "B.B.'s Boogie" or songs by employees, such as bandleader Vince Weaver. The Biharis used a number of pseudonyms for songwriting credits: Jules was credited as Jules Taub, Joe as Joe Josea, and Saul as Sam Ling. One song by John Lee Hooker, "Down Child" is solely credited to "Taub", with Hooker receiving no credit for the song whatsoever. Another, "Turn Over a New Leaf" is credited to Hooker and "Ling". Taub was the Biharis' mother's maiden name.

The Biharis added their name to writing credits when they had had no input into the writing of the music or lyrics. B.B. King said: "The company I was with knew a lot of things they didn’t tell me, that I didn’t learn about until later... Some of the songs I wrote, they added a name when I copyrighted it,"..."Like 'King and Ling' or 'King and Josea.' There was no such thing as Ling, or Josea. No such thing. That way, the company could claim half of your song." Ike Turner was a young talent scout for the Biharis and was also a session musician and production assistant. Turner, unaware of royalties, wrote songs as well which the Biharis copyrighted under their pseudonyms. Turner estimated he "wrote 78 hit records for the Biharis."
