= The Penguins =

American doowop band

- Origin: Los Angeles, California, United States
- Genres: Doo-wop, rhythm and blues
- Years active: 1953–2012
- Labels: Dootone, Mercury, Atlantic
- Past members: Cleveland Duncan; Curtis Williams; Dexter Tisby; Bruce Tate; Randy Jones; Ray Brewster; Teddy Harper; Walter Saulsberry; Vesta King; Evelyn King; Vera Walker; Rudy Wilson; Glenn Madison

The Penguins were an American doo-wop group from Los Angeles, California, that were active during the 1950s and early 1960s. They are known for their 1954 hit song, "Earth Angel", which was one of the first rhythm and blues songs to cross over to the pop charts. The song would ultimately prove to be their only success. The song peaked at No. 8 on the US Billboard Best Sellers in Stores pop chart but had a three-week run at No. 1 on the R&B chart.

== Early career ==
The original members of The Penguins were tenor Cleveland Duncan (July 23, 1935 – November 7, 2012), Curtis Williams (baritone/bass)(December 11, 1934 – August 10, 1979), Dexter Tisby (tenor)(March 10, 1935 – May 2019) and Bruce Tate (baritone)(January 27, 1937 – June 20, 1973). Duncan and Williams were former classmates at Fremont High School in Los Angeles, California, and Williams had become a member of The Hollywood Flames. In late 1953, they decided to form a new vocal group and added Tisby and Tate. Their midtempo performance style was a cross between rhythm and blues and rock and roll. Williams brought with him a song, "Earth Angel", on which he had worked with Gaynel Hodge, another member of the Hollywood Flames.

The Penguins were one of a number of doo-wop groups of the period named after birds (such as The Orioles, The Flamingos, and The Crows). One of the members smoked Kool cigarettes, which, at the time, had "Willie the Penguin" as its cartoon advertising character. They considered themselves "cool" and accordingly decided to call themselves "The Penguins".

Dootone Records released The Penguins' single "Hey Senorita" in late 1954 as the intended A-side, but a radio DJ flipped the record over to the B-side: "Earth Angel" worked its way up to No. 1 on the Billboard R&B chart (the only Penguins song to chart that high) and held that place for three weeks early in 1955. By 1966, the disc had sold four million copies. The Penguins followed up this hit with a Christmas release "A Christmas prayer" with "Jingle Jangle."

The Penguins performed for the eleventh famed Cavalcade of Jazz concert held at Wrigley Field in Los Angeles which was produced by Leon Hefflin, Sr. on July 24, 1955. Also featured Big Jay McNeely, Lionel Hampton and his Orchestra, The Medallions and James Moody and his Orchestra.

Duncan sang lead on "Earth Angel". He reprised his performance a decade later on Frank Zappa's "Memories of El Monte", an elegiac 1963 song in which he suddenly breaks into "Earth Angel" as one of the various songs remembered. El Monte, a city near Los Angeles, had spawned such popular performers as Tony Allan, Marvin & Johnny, and The Shields as well as the Penguins. Those groups were also emulated as part of Zappa's tribute to early days of rock and roll.

In a common practice of the time, radio stations frequently featured segregated playlists. Thus, "Earth Angel" was simultaneously recorded by the white group The Crew-Cuts in 1955. The Crew-Cuts cover peaked at No. 3 on the Hot 100 chart, five spots higher than the Penguins version. The single's success contributed to the Crew-Cuts' own successful career of recording crossover-friendly covers of R&B hits.

The songwriting genesis for "Earth Angel" was a matter of some dispute, eventually ending up in a split credit between Penguins bass-baritone Curtis Williams, Gaynel Hodge, and Jesse Belvin.

== After "Earth Angel" ==
Coming off the success of "Earth Angel", the Penguins approached Buck Ram to manage them. Ram's primary interest was in managing The Platters, who at that point had no hit singles, but were a profitable touring group. With the Penguins in hand, Ram was able to swing a 2-for-1 deal with Mercury Records, in which the company agreed to take on the Platters as a condition for getting the Penguins (the group that Mercury really wanted). The Platters became the label's more successful act, the Penguins never scoring another hit single.

In 1955, Bruce Tate left the group. He was replaced by Randy Jones (who would later sing with the Cadets). During the summer of 1956, Jones and Tisby were briefly out of the group, and were replaced by Ray Brewster and Teddy Harper, respectively. Jones and Tisby returned shortly afterwards. Curtis Williams left in December 1957, with Harper rejoining as his permanent replacement. The Penguins never had another national hit, but their 1957 cover of "Pledge of Love" reached No. 15 on the R&B chart.

== Later years ==
The group broke up in 1962. Cleveland Duncan continued recording as "The Penguins", with new member Walter Saulsberry and a backing group, the Viceroys. Later, the group was Duncan, Saulsberry, Vesta and Evelyn King, and Vera Walker. (Duncan and the King sisters had recorded a record as "Cleve Duncan and the Radiants" in 1959.) By the late 1960s, the group was being billed as the "Fabulous Penguins", and featured Duncan, Walker, and new member Rudy Wilson. By the 1970s, the members were Duncan, the returning Walter Saulsberry, and new member Glenn Madison, formerly of the Delcos (Indiana). This was the current line up of the group until 2012.

The group performed on the PBS television special, Doo Wop 50. Duncan, Madison, and Saulsberry also performed with Randy Jones as guest, in 2001. It was planned for Jones to appear with the Penguins the following year but he suffered a stroke while rehearsing with the group and died shortly thereafter. Jones also performed with the reunited Jacks/Cadets in the 1990s. Duncan died on November 7, 2012, in Los Angeles at the age of 77.

The group is mentioned in the Paul Simon song "Rene and Georgette Magritte with Their Dog after the War". In interviews, Simon has told about hearing "Earth Angel," the first R&B song he said he had heard; he describes trying to explain to his father, a big band musician, how great the song was.

== Award ==
The Penguins were inducted into The Vocal Group Hall of Fame in 2004.
