= Elkie Brooks discography =

This is the discography of English singer Elkie Brooks.

== Studio albums ==
Year	Title	Peak chart positions						Certifications	Record label
Year	Title	UK	AUS	NLD	NZ	SWE	SCO	Certifications	Record label
1975	Rich Man's Woman	—	—	—	—	—	—		A&M
1977	Two Days Away	16	46	19	34	—	—	BPI: Gold	A&M
1978	Shooting Star	20	—	—	—	—	—	BPI: Silver	A&M
1979	Live and Learn	34	—	—	—	—	—		A&M
1981	Pearls	2	—	49	—	40	—	BPI: Platinum	A&M
1982	Pearls II	5	—	—	—	20	—	BPI: Platinum	A&M
1984	Minutes	35	—	—	—	—	—		A&M
1984	Screen Gems	35	—	—	—	—	—	BPI: Gold	A&M
1986	No More the Fool	5	—	—	—	—	—	BPI: Gold	Legend
1988	Bookbinder's Kid	57	—	—	—	—	—		Legend
1989	Inspiration	58	—	—	—	—	—		Telstar
1991	Pearls III	—	—	—	—	—	—		Freestyle
1993	Round Midnight	27	—	—	—	—	—		Castle
1994	Nothin' but the Blues	58	—	—	—	—	59		Castle
1995	Circles	—	—	—	—	—	—		Permanent
1996	Amazing	49	—	—	—	—	76		Carlton Classics
2003	Shangri-La	—	—	—	—	—	—		Classic Pictures
2003	Trouble in Mind (with Humphrey Lyttelton)	—	—	—	—	—	—		Classic Pictures
2005	Electric Lady	—	—	—	—	—	—		Swing Cafe
2010	Powerless	—	—	—	—	—	—		Eventful Music Productions
"—" denotes releases that did not chart or were not released in that territory.

== Live albums ==
Year	Album	Label
1997	The Pearls Concert	Artful
2005	Don't Cry Out Loud	Recall
2007	Live with Friends	EMP Records

== Compilations ==
Year	Album	Charts	Certifications	Label
Year	Album	UK	Certifications	Label
1986	The Very Best of Elkie Brooks	10		Telstar
1991	Priceless: Her Very Best	—		Pickwick
1993	Original Recordings	—		Castle
1994	Love Is Love	—		Castle
1995	The Best of Elkie Brooks	—		Spectrum
1997	The Very Best of Elkie Brooks	23	BPI: Gold	Polygram
1997	Master Series	—		A&M
1998	Songs of Love	—		Castle
2000	Millennium Edition	—		A&M
2000	Hold the Dream: Anthology	—		Castle
2000	Greatest Hits	—		Brilliant
2001	Pearl's Singer	—		Planet Song
2003	No More the Fool	—		Delta
2007	The Silver Collection	45		Spectrum
2017	Pearls: The Very Best Of	14		A&M

== Singles ==
Year	Single	Chart positions					Album	Label
Year	Single	UK	AUS	IRE	NLD	NZ	Album	Label
1964	"Something's Got a Hold on Me"	—	—	—	—	—	Non-album single	Decca
1964	"Nothing Left to Do but Cry"	—	—	—	—	—	Non-album single	Decca
1965	"The Way You Do the Things You Do"	—	—	—	—	—	Non-album single	Decca
1965	"He's Gotta Love Me"	—	—	—	—	—	Non-album single	His Master's Voice
1965	"All of My Life"	—	—	—	—	—	Non-album single	His Master's Voice
1966	"Baby Let Me Love You"	—	—	—	—	—	Non-album single	His Master's Voice
1969	"Come September"	—	—	—	—	—	Non-album single	NEMS
1974	"Rescue Me"	—	—	—	—	—	Non-album single	Island
1975	"Where Do We Go from Here"	—	—	—	—	—	Rich Man's Woman	A&M
1975	"He's a Rebel"	—	—	—	—	—	Rich Man's Woman	A&M
1977	"Pearl's a Singer"	8	65	9	11	11	Two Days Away	A&M
1977	"Saved"	—	—	—	—	—	Two Days Away	A&M
1977	"Sunshine After the Rain"	10	100	7	—	—	Two Days Away	A&M
1977	"Do Right Woman, Do Right Man"	—	—	—	—	—	Two Days Away	A&M
1978	"Lilac Wine"	16	—	8	50	—	Non-album single	A&M
1978	"Only Love Can Break Your Heart"	43	—	—	—	—	Shooting Star	A&M
1978	"Since You Went Away"	—	—	—	—	—	Shooting Star	A&M
1978	"Stay with Me" (Netherlands only)	—	—	—	—	—	Shooting Star	A&M
1978	"Don't Cry Out Loud"	12	—	14	—	—	Non-album single	A&M
1979	"The Runaway"	50	—	—	—	—	Non-album single	A&M
1979	"He Could Have Been an Army"	—	—	—	—	—	Live and Learn	A&M
1979	"Falling Star"	—	—	—	—	—	Live and Learn	A&M
1980	"Why Don't You Say It"	—	—	—	—	—	Non-album single	A&M
1980	"Paint Your Pretty Picture"	—	—	—	—	—	Pearls	A&M
1980	"Dance Away"	—	—	—	—	—	Pearls	A&M
1981	"Warm and Tender Love"	—	—	—	—	—	Pearls	A&M
1981	"Fool (If You Think It's Over)"	17	—	6	—	—	Pearls	A&M
1982	"Our Love"	43	—	—	—	—	Pearls II	A&M
1982	"Nights in White Satin"	33	—	14	—	—	Pearls II	A&M
1982	"Will You Write Me a Song"	—	—	—	—	—	Pearls II	A&M
1983	"Gasoline Alley"	52	—	15	—	—	Pearls II	A&M
1983	"I Just Can't Go On"	—	—	—	—	—	Pearls II	A&M
1984	"Minutes"	—	—	—	—	—	Minutes	A&M
1984	"Driftin'"	—	—	—	—	—	Minutes	A&M
1984	"Once in a While"	—	—	—	—	—	Screen Gems	A&M/EMI
1986	"No More the Fool"	5	—	—	—	—	No More the Fool	Legend
1987	"Break the Chain"	55	—	—	—	—	No More the Fool	Legend
1987	"We've Got Tonight"	69	—	—	—	—	No More the Fool	Legend
1988	"Sail On"	—	—	—	—	—	Bookbinders Kid	Legend
1989	"Shame"	—	—	—	—	—	Inspiration	Telstar
1989	"You're the Inspiration" (Belgium only)	—	—	—	—	—	Inspiration	Telstar
1990	"I'll Never Love This Way Again"	—	—	—	—	—	Inspiration	Telstar
1990	"For the World" (withdrawn before release)	—	—	—	—	—	Non-album single	European Artists
1991	"The Last Teardrop"	—	—	—	—	—	Pearls III (Close to the Edge)	Freestyle
1991	"One of a Kind" (Belgium only)	—	—	—	—	—	Pearls III (Close to the Edge)	Freestyle
1999	"Too Much to Lose" (with Courtney Pine)	181	—	—	—	—	Unfinished Business (unreleased)	BMG
2005	"Out of the Rain"	—	—	—	—	—	Electric Lady	Swing Cafe
2010	"Powerless"	—	—	—	—	—	Powerless	Eventful Music Productions
2017	"Running to the Future"	—	—	—	—	—	Finding Your Feet (soundtrack)	Virgin EMI
"—" denotes releases that did not chart or were not released in that territory.

== Other appearances ==
=== Singles ===
Cat Stevens' duet with Elkie Brooks "Remember the Days of the Old Schoolyard".

Chart (1977)	Peak
Australia (Kent Music Report)	18
Canadian Singles Chart (RPM Top 100)	27
Canada Adult Contemporary (RPM)	14
France (SNEP)	35
UK Singles Chart	44
US Billboard Hot 100	33
US Adult Contemporary (Billboard)	28
US Top 100 Singles (Cashbox)	38

Various Artists The Anti-Heroin Project. Charity Single produced by Charles Foskett.

Guest appearances:John Parr, Elkie Brooks, Bonnie Tyler, Nik Kershaw, Holly Johnson, Kim Wilde, Hazel O'Connor, Cliff Richard, Robin Gibb, Mike Peters and others.

Year	Single	UK Chart
1986	"Live-In World" (The Anti-Heroin Project)	142

=== Albums ===
Vinegar Joe with Elkie Brooks, Robert Palmer and Pete Gage.

Year	Album	Chart	Peak	Ref.
1972	Vinegar Joe			
1972	Rock'n Roll Gypsies	US Billboard Bubbling Under the Top LP's	201	
1973	Six Star General			

Various Artists Original Studio Cast: Frankie Miller, Alice Cooper, Elkie Brooks, The Who's John Entwistle, Jim "Dandy" Mangrum, James Dewar, Keith Moon, Justin Hayward, Eddie Jobson.

Album	Chart (1975)	Peak	Ref.
Flash Fearless Vs. the Zorg Women, Pts. 5 & 6	US Billboard FM Action	9	
Flash Fearless Vs. the Zorg Women, Pts. 5 & 6	US Record World	181	
Flash Fearless Vs. the Zorg Women, Pts. 5 & 6	US Billboard Bubbling Under The Top LP's	209	

Lou Reizner's stage production of Tommy featuring the London Symphony Orchestra.

This version featured Roger Daltrey, David Essex, Marsha Hunt, Elkie Brooks, Roger Chapman, Graham Bell, Bill Oddie, Merry Clayton, Vivian Stanshall, Roy Wood and Jon Pertwee.

Year	Album	Country	Ref.
1975	Tommy Live at the Rainbow 1973	United States	
1995	Roger Daltrey – Orchestral Tommy	Japan	
