= The Very Best of Elkie Brooks =

The Very Best of Elkie Brooks may refer to any of several to Elkie Brooks compilation albums:

- The Very Best of Elkie Brooks (A&M), issued in 1986 on CD, vinyl and cassette through A&M Records in the Granada TV region only
- The Very Best of Elkie Brooks (1997 album), released on CD and cassette by PolyGram TV
- The Very Best of Elkie Brooks (1986 album), issued on CD, vinyl and cassette in 1986 through Telstar Records
