= List of songs written by Jerry Leiber and Mike Stoller =

This is a list of songs written by Jerry Leiber and Mike Stoller, in most cases as a songwriting duo. The pair also collaborated with other songwriters, and also on rare occasions wrote songs as individuals with other writers.

== Chart hits written by Leiber and Stoller ==
Year	Song	Original artist	^{U.S. Pop}	^{U.S. R&B}	^{UK Singles Chart}	Other charting versions, and notes
1952	"Hard Times"	Charles Brown	-	7	-	
1952	"Kansas City" ("K.C. Lovin'" on original release)	Little Willie Littlefield	-	-	-	1959: Wilbert Harrison, #1 US pop, #1 R&B; 1959: Hank Ballard & The Midnighters, #72 US pop, #16 R&B; 1959: Rocky Olson, #60 US pop 1959: Little Richard, #95 US pop, #26 UK; 1963: Trini Lopez, #23 US pop, #35 UK; 1967: James Brown, #55 US pop, #21 R&B
1953	"Hound Dog"	Big Mama Thornton	-	1	-	1956: Elvis Presley, #1 US pop, #1 R&B, #1 US country, #2 UK; 1971: Elvis Presley, #10 UK (reissue); 2007: Elvis Presley, #14 UK (reissue)
1954	"Love Me"	Willy & Ruth	-	-	-	1956: Elvis Presley, #2 US pop, #7 R&B, #10 US country
1954	"Framed"	The Robins	-	-	-	1976: Cheech and Chong, #41 US pop; Also covered by Little Feat on Hoy-Hoy! (US Top 40 album, 1981)
1954	"Jack o' Diamonds"	Jacki Fontaine	-	-	-	1959: Ruth Brown, #96 US pop
1954	"Bazoom (I Need Your Lovin')"	The Cheers	15	-	-	1955: The Charms, #15 R&B
1955	"Black Denim Trousers and Motorcycle Boots"	The Cheers	6	-	-	1955: Vaughn Monroe, #38 US pop
1955	"Smokey Joe's Cafe"	The Robins	79	10	-	
1955	"I Want to Do More"	Ruth Brown	-	3	-	
1956	"Ruby Baby"	The Drifters	-	10	-	1963: Dion, #2 US pop, #5 R&B; 1974: Billy "Crash" Craddock, #33 US pop, #1 US country
1956	"The Chicken and the Hawk"	Big Joe Turner	-	7	-	
1956	"Down in Mexico"	The Coasters	-	8	-	
1956	"One Kiss Led to Another"	The Coasters	73	11	-	
1957	"Lucky Lips"	Ruth Brown	25	6	-	1957: Gale Storm, #77 US pop 1963: Cliff Richard, #62 US pop, #4 UK
1957	"Fools Fall in Love"	The Drifters	69	10	-	1977: Jacky Ward, #9 US country
1957	"Searchin'"	The Coasters	3	1	30	1961: Jack Eubanks, #83 US pop 1963: The Hollies, #12 UK; 1964: Ace Cannon, #84 US pop 1976: Jim Croce, #63 US pop (as part of "Chain Gang Medley")
1957	"Young Blood"	The Coasters	8	1	-	Written by Leiber, Stoller, and Doc Pomus; 1976: Bad Company, #20 US pop 1987: Bruce Willis, #68 US pop
1957	"Loving You"	Elvis Presley	20	-	24	
1957	"Dancin'"	Perry Como	76	-	-	
1957	"Jailhouse Rock"	Elvis Presley	1	1	1	1957: Elvis Presley, also #1 US country 1971: Elvis Presley, #42 UK (reissue); 1977: Elvis Presley, #44 UK (reissue); 1982: Russ Abbot, #61 UK (as part of parody medley, "A Day In the Life Of Vince Prince"); 1983: Elvis Presley, #27 UK (reissue); 2005: Elvis Presley, #1 UK (reissue)
1957	"Idol with the Golden Head"	The Coasters	64	-	-	
1957	"Treat Me Nice"	Elvis Presley	18	7	24	1957: Elvis Presley, #11 US country
1957	"Santa Claus Is Back in Town"	Elvis Presley	-	-	7	1965: Elvis Presley, #4 US Christmas singles 1980: Elvis Presley, #41 UK (reissue); 1997: Dwight Yoakam, #60 US country
1957	"(When She Wants Good Lovin') My Baby Comes to Me"	The Coasters	-	-	-	1966: Chicago Loop, #37 US pop
1958	"(You're So Square) Baby I Don't Care"	Elvis Presley	-	14	-	1961: Buddy Holly, #12 UK; 1982: Joni Mitchell, #47 US pop 1983: Elvis Presley, #61 UK (reissue)
1958	"Don't"	Elvis Presley	1	4	2	1958: Elvis Presley, #2 US country 1973: Sandy Posey, #39 US country 2007: Elvis Presley, #14 UK (reissue)
1958	"Yakety Yak"	The Coasters	1	1	12	1975: Eric Weissberg and Deliverance, #91 US country 1989: 2 Live Crew, #90 UK
1958	"Sorry, But I'm Gonna Have to Pass"	The Coasters	-	-	-	1994: The Coasters, #41 UK (reissue)
1958	"Drip Drop"	The Drifters	58	-	-	1963: Dion DiMucci, #6 US pop
1958	"King Creole"	Elvis Presley	-	-	2	2007: Elvis Presley, #15 UK (reissue)
1958	"Trouble"	Elvis Presley	-	-	-	1980: Gillan, #14 UK
1959	"Charlie Brown"	The Coasters	2	2	6	1970: The Compton Brothers, #16 US country
1959	"Along Came Jones"	The Coasters	9	14	-	1969: Ray Stevens, #27 US pop
1959	"Poison Ivy"	The Coasters	7	1	15	1964: The Paramounts, #35 UK; 1980: The Lambrettas, #7 UK; 1990: Young & Restless, #76 R&B
1959	"I'm a Hog for You"	The Coasters	38	-	-	
1959	"Love Potion No. 9"	The Clovers	23	23	-	1964: The Searchers, #3 US pop 1971: The Coasters, #76 US pop 1980: Rinder & Lewis, #20 US Disco Action
1959	"There Goes My Baby"	The Drifters	2	1	-	Written by Leiber, Stoller, Ben E. King, George Treadwell, and Lover Patterson; 1984: Donna Summer, #21 US pop, #20 R&B
1959	"Dance with Me"	The Drifters	15	2	17	Written by Leiber, Stoller, George Treadwell, Irving Nahan and Lewis Lebish; 1989: Rick James, #74 R&B (as part of medley with "This Magic Moment")
1959	"What About Us"	The Coasters	47	17	-	
1959	"Run Red Run"	The Coasters	36	29	-	
1960	"Lorelei"	Lonnie Donegan	-	-	10	
1960	"Shoppin' for Clothes"	The Coasters	83	-	-	Written by Leiber, Stoller, and Kent Harris
1960	"Dirty, Dirty Feeling"	Elvis Presley	-	-	-	1965: Elvis Presley, #70 US pop
1961	"You're the Boss"	Jimmy Ricks and LaVern Baker	81	-	-	
1961	"Saved"	LaVern Baker	37	17	-	
1961	"Little Egypt (Ying-Yang)"	The Coasters	23	16	-	
1961	"Stand by Me"	Ben E. King	4	1	27	Written by Leiber, Stoller, and Ben E. King; 1964: Cassius Clay, #47 R&B; 1964: Kenny Lynch, #39 UK; 1965: Earl Grant, #75 US pop 1966: Spyder Turner, #12 US pop, #3 R&B; 1970: David & Jimmy Ruffin, #61 US pop, #24 R&B; 1975: John Lennon, #20 US pop, #30 UK; 1980: Mickey Gilley, #22 US pop, #1 US country 1985: Maurice White, #50 US pop, #6 R&B; 1986: Ben E. King, #9 US pop, #1 UK (reissue); 1998: 4 The Cause, #82 US pop, #12 UK; 2010: Prince Royce, #8 US Hot Latin Songs, #1 US Latin Tropical Airplay, #17 US Heatseekers Songs; 2012: Ben E. King, #84 UK (reissue)
1961	"I'll Be There"	Damita Jo	12	15	-	Written by Leiber, Stoller, Ben E. King, and Ollie Jones; Answer record to "Stand by Me"
1961	"My Claire de Lune"	Steve Lawrence	68	-	-	Based on Claude Debussy's "Clair de Lune," third movement of the Suite Bergamasque.
1961	"Girls Girls Girls"	The Coasters	96	-	-	1965: The Fourmost, #33 UK
1962	"She's Not You"	Elvis Presley	5	13	1	Written by Leiber, Stoller, and Doc Pomus; 2005: Elvis Presley, #3 UK (reissue)
1962	"Just Tell Her Jim Said Hello"	Elvis Presley	55	-	-	
1962	"I'm a Woman"	Christine Kittrell	-	-	-	1963: Peggy Lee, #54 US pop 1974: Maria Muldaur, #12 US pop
1962	"Some Other Guy"	Richie Barrett	-	-	-	Written by Leiber, Stoller, and Richard Barrett; 1963: The Big Three, #37 UK
1962	"I Keep Forgettin'"	Chuck Jackson	55	-	-	
1962	"What to Do with Laurie"	Mike Clifford	68	-	-	Written by Leiber, Stoller, and Billy Edd Wheeler
1962	"Bossa Nova Baby"	Tippie and the Clovers	-	-	-	1963: Elvis Presley, #8 US pop, #20 R&B, #13 UK
1963	"The Man Who Robbed the Bank at Santa Fe"	Hank Snow	-	-	-	Written by Leiber, Stoller, and Billy Edd Wheeler #9 US country
1963	"On Broadway"	The Drifters	9	7	-	Written by Leiber, Stoller, Barry Mann and Cynthia Weil; 1978: George Benson, #7 US pop, #2 R&B
1963	"The Reverend Mr. Black"	The Kingston Trio	8	15	-	Written by Leiber, Stoller, and Billy Edd Wheeler; 1982: Johnny Cash, #71 US country
1963	"Rat Race"	The Drifters	71	-	-	Written by Leiber, Stoller, and Van McCoy
1963	"Get Him"	The Exciters	76	-	-	Written by Leiber, Stoller, Bert Russell and Ray Passman
1963	"I (Who Have Nothing)"	Ben E. King	29	16	-	Written by Leiber, Stoller, Mogol, and Carlo Donida; 1963: Shirley Bassey, #6 UK; 1966: Terry Knight and the Pack, #46 US pop 1970: Liquid Smoke, #82 US pop 1970: Tom Jones, #14 US pop, #16 UK; 1977: Sylvester, #40 US pop, #27 R&B, #4 US Disco Action, #46 UK; 1978: Theo Vaness, #14 US Disco Action (as part of medley, "Back to Music"); 2007: Jordin Sparks, #80 US pop 2011: Haley Reinhart
1963	"Only in America"	Jay and the Americans	25	-	-	Written by Leiber, Stoller, Barry Mann and Cynthia Weil
1967	"D. W. Washburn"	The Coasters	-	-	-	1968: The Monkees, #19 US pop, #17 UK
1968	"Do Your Own Thing"	Brook Benton	99	-	-	
1968	"Is That All There Is?"	Leslie Uggams	-	-	-	1969: Peggy Lee, #11 US pop
1968	"Shake 'em Up and Let 'em Roll"	Earl Richards	-	-	-	1976: George Kent, #75 US country
1970	"(How Bout a Little Hand For) The Boys in the Band"	The Boys in the Band	48	-	-	
1974	"Pearl's a Singer"	Dino & Sembello	-	-	-	Written by Leiber, Stoller, Ralph Dino and John Sembello; 1977: Elkie Brooks, #8 UK, #9 Ireland, #8 Portugal, #11 Netherlands, #11 New Zealand #23 Belgium, #65 Australia, #17 Europarade
1974	"The Best Thing"	Dino & Sembello	-	-	-	Written by Leiber, Stoller, Ralph Dino and John Sembello; 1976: Billy Eckstine, #84 R&B
1982	"Bobbie Sue"	The Oak Ridge Boys	12	-	-	Written by Jerry Leiber, Mike Stoller, Dan Tyler, Adele Tyler, and Wood Newton; 1982: The Oak Ridge Boys, #19 US AC, #1 US Country, #20 CAN Pop, #1 CAN AC, #1 CAN Country; RIAA Gold
1982	"I Keep Forgettin' (Every Time You're Near)"	Michael McDonald	4	7	43	Written by Leiber, Stoller, Michael McDonald and Ed Sanford
1994	"Regulate"	Warren G and Nate Dogg	2	7	5	Samples "I Keep Forgettin' (Every Time You're Near)", written by Leiber, Stoller, Michael McDonald and Ed Sanford; 1994: Warren G and Nate Dogg, #1 US Hot Rap Singles
2007	"Beautiful Girls"	Sean Kingston	1	12	1	Samples Ben E. King's "Stand by Me"
2022	"Vegas"	Doja Cat	31	-	25	Samples Big Mama Thornton's "Hound Dog"
2023	"Hands on Me"	Jason Derulo feat. Meghan Trainor	-	-	-	Interpolates Ben E. King's "Stand by Me"

== Chart hits written by Leiber with others ==
Year	Song	Original artist	^{U.S. Pop}	^{U.S. R&B}	^{UK Singles Chart}	Other charting versions, and notes
1960	"Spanish Harlem"	Ben E. King	10	15	-	Written by Jerry Leiber and Phil Spector; 1962: Jimmy Justice, #20 UK; 1964: Sounds Incorporated, #35 UK; 1965: King Curtis, #89 US pop 1971: Aretha Franklin, #2 US pop, #1 R&B, #14 UK; 1987: Ben E. King, #92 UK (reissue)
1963	"Jackson"	The Kingston Trio	-	-	-	Written by Jerry Leiber and Billy Edd Wheeler. Leiber's contribution was credited to his wife, Gaby Rodgers. 1967: Johnny Cash and June Carter, #2 US country 1967: Lee Hazlewood and Nancy Sinatra, #14 US pop, #11 UK (listed in official UK chart, though issued as B-side of "You Only Live Twice")
1966	"Past, Present and Future"	The Shangri-Las	59	-	-	Written by Jerry Leiber, Artie Butler and Shadow Morton

== Chart hits written by Stoller with others ==
Year	Song	Original artist	^{U.S. Pop}	^{U.S. R&B}	^{UK Singles Chart}	Other charting versions, and notes
1964	"His Kiss"	Betty Harris	89	15	-	Written by Mike Stoller and Bert Russell
