= The Pearls Concert =

Live album by Elkie Brooks
- Released: 1997
- Recorded: 1997
- Genre: Rock, pop, blues
- Label: Artful
- Producer: Trevor Jordan

Elkie Brooks chronology
The Very Best of Elkie Brooks (1997)	The Pearls Concert (1997)	Shangri-La (2003)

The Pearls Concert is an album by Elkie Brooks, recorded in 1997 and released on CD and cassette in 1997 by Artful Records.

The album failed to enter the UK charts.

== Track listing ==
=== Disc one ===
1. "Butterfly Blue" (Iron Butterfly)
2. "Love Potion No. 9" (Leiber, Stoller)
3. "Do Right Woman, Do Right Man" (Hammond, Penn)
4. "Goin' Back"
5. "I Just Can't Go On (Bishop, Baker)
6. "Fool If You Think It's Over" (Rea)
7. "Our Love" (Gallagher, Lyle)
8. "Too Much Between Us Baby" (Milns)
9. "To Hold the Dream" (Guard)
10. "Seagull"

=== Disc two ===
1. "Can't Find My Way Home" (Winwood)
2. "Pearl's a Singer" (Leiber, Stoller, Dino, Sembello)
3. "Blues for Mama" (Simone, Lincoln)
4. "Here's That Rainy Day" (Heusen, Burke)
5. "Once In A While" (Green, Edwards)
6. "What'll I Do" (Berlin)
7. "Lilac Wine" (Shelton)
8. "Nights in White Satin" (Hayward)
9. "Only Women Bleed" (Cooper, Wagner)
10. "No More the Fool" (Ballard)
11. "We've Got Tonight" (Seger)

== Personnel ==
- Elkie Brooks – vocals
- Andrew Murray – keyboards
- Mike Richardson – drums
- Tim Mills – guitar
- Phil Mulford – bass guitar
- Trevor Jordan – engineering
