= Pearls (Elkie Brooks album) =

Studio album by Elkie Brooks
- Released: November 1981 (UK)
- Recorded: 1977–1981
- Genres: Rock; pop
- Label: A&M
- Producers: Gus Dudgeon; Mike Batt; Jerry Leiber and Mike Stoller

Elkie Brooks chronology
Live and Learn (1979)	Pearls (1981)	Pearls II (1982)

Pearls is the fifth studio album by English singer Elkie Brooks, released in 1981. It is in part a compilation album, featuring earlier singles by Brooks mixed with newly recorded material. It went on to become a major hit in the United Kingdom – the biggest of her career.

== Background ==
With the relative disappointment of Brooks' previous album, Live and Learn, A&M decided to release a compilation of her biggest hits and newly recorded material aimed firmly at the middle of the road audience. The new material was produced by Elton John's producer Gus Dudgeon. Pearls peaked at number 2 in the UK Albums Chart, staying on the chart for 79 weeks. It was first released on CD in 1985. Pearls remains Brooks' biggest selling album.

== Single releases ==
- "Paint Your Pretty Picture" (1980)
- "Dance Away" (1980)
- "Warm and Tender Love" (1981)
- "Fool If You Think It's Over" (UK No. 17, 1981)

== Track listing ==
Side one

No.	Title	Writer(s)	Length
1.	"Superstar"	Leon Russell; Bonnie Bramlett	3:28
2.	"Fool (If You Think It's Over)"	Chris Rea	4:58
3.	"Givin' It Up for Your Love"	Jerry Lynn Williams	3:56
4.	"Sunshine After the Rain"	Ellie Greenwich	3:24
5.	"Warm and Tender Love"	Bobby Robinson	4:09
6.	"Lilac Wine"	James Shelton	3:55

Side two

No.	Title	Writer(s)	Length
1.	"Pearl's a Singer"	Jerry Leiber; Mike Stoller; Ralph Dino, John Sembello	3:39
2.	"Don't Cry Out Loud"	Peter Allen; Carole Bayer Sager	3:46
3.	"Too Busy Thinking About My Baby"	Norman Whitfield; Janie Bradford; Barrett Strong	3:19
4.	"If You Leave Me Now"	Peter Cetera	3:50
5.	"Paint Your Pretty Picture"	Bill Withers	3:34
6.	"Dance Away"	Richard Kerr; Troy Seals	3:59

== Personnel ==
- Elkie Brooks – vocals
- Jean Roussel, Tim Hinkley, Mike Stoller – piano/keyboards
- Isaac Guillory, Jerry Friedmen, Eric Weissberg, Geoff Whitehorn, Martin Jenner – guitars
- Steve York, John Giblin, Jeremy Meek – bass guitar
- Trevor Morais, Graham Jarvis, Steve Holley – drums
- Pete Wingfield, Bruce Baxter – arrangement
- Graham Dickson – engineering
- Gus Dudgeon, Jerry Leiber & Mike Stoller, Mike Batt – production

== Charts ==
Chart performance for Pearls
Chart (1981)	Peak position
Dutch Albums (Album Top 100)	49
Swedish Albums (Sverigetopplistan)	40
UK Albums (Official Charts)	2

== Certifications ==
Region	Certification	Certified units/sales
United Kingdom (BPI)	Platinum	300,000^{^}
^{^} Shipments figures based on certification alone.
