= Live (Elkie Brooks album) =

Live album by Elkie Brooks
- Released: 2000
- Recorded: 1999–2000
- Genre: rock, pop, blues
- Label: JAM

Elkie Brooks chronology
Live at the Palladium (2000)	Live (2000)	Don't Cry Out Loud (2005)

Live is an album by Elkie Brooks. Recorded live on tour in 1999 and 2000, it was released on CD in 2000 through JAM Records.

Since the album was only available on tour, it was not chart eligible.

== Track listing ==
1. "Nights in White Satin"
2. "Sail On"
3. "Fool If you Think Its Over"
4. "Besame Mucho"
5. "No More The fool"
6. "Natural Thing"
7. "Lilac Wine"
8. "Sunshine After the Rain"
9. "Hold On"
10. "Cross Roads"
11. "Red House"
12. "Baby What You Want Me to Do"
13. "Pearl's a Singer"
14. "Gasoline Alley"
15. "We've Got Tonight"
16. "Tore Down"

== Personnel ==
- Elkie Brooks – vocals
- Jean Roussel – keyboards
- Brandon Fownes – Keyboards
- Al Hodge – guitar
- Mike Cahen – guitar
- Mike Richardson – drums
- Roger Innis – bass
- Arnaud Frank – percussion
