= Circles (Elkie Brooks album) =

Studio album by Elkie Brooks
- Released: 1995
- Recorded: 1995, Woody Bay Studio
- Genre: Rock
- Label: Permanent
- Producer: Elkie Brooks, Trevor Jordan

Elkie Brooks chronology
Nothin' But the Blues (1994)	Circles (1995)	Amazing (1996)

Circles is an album by Elkie Brooks. Recorded in 1995 in Brooks's home studio Woody Bay, the album was designed to reflect her love of stripped-down acoustic music and demo format songs.

It was released on CD and cassette in the same year by Permanent Records, with no promotion and a small distribution. It was subsequently re-released on CD by Indellible Records.

== Track listing ==
1. "It All Comes Back On You" (Brooks, Andrew Murray)
2. "Live A Little Get Somewhere" (Pete Gage)
3. "Circles" (Robert Palmer)
4. "Mercedes Benz" (Janis Joplin)
5. "Can't Find My Way Home" (Stevie Winwood)
6. "Angel" (Jimi Hendrix)
7. "Pearl's a Singer" (Ralph Dino, John Sembello, Jerry Leiber, Mike Stoller)
8. "Live in Peace" (Paul Rodgers)
9. "Butterfly Bleu" (Iron Butterfly, Robert Woods Edmonson)
10. "You're Gonna Make Me Cry" (Deadric Malone)
11. "Lilac Wine" (James Shelton)

== Personnel ==
- Elkie Brooks – vocals, production
- Andrew Murray – piano, keyboards
- Tim Mills – guitars
- Phil Mulford – bass guitar
- Mike Richardson – drums
- Trevor Jordan – engineering, production
