= Live 2000 =

Live 2000 may refer to:

- Live 2000 Michael Landau (2007)
- Live 2000 by Celtus
- Live (Elkie Brooks album)
- NBA Live 2000
