= New Atlantic =

New Atlantic are a British electronic dance music duo from Southport, Merseyside, consisting of Richard Lloyd (born 6 February 1973) and Cameron Saunders (born 11 June 1973). They are best known for the UK hit single "I Know" which reached No. 12 in March 1992. The CD single of "I Know" contained an alternate mix, which was performed by the group onstage on the UK television programme, The Hitman and Her. New Atlantic were signed to Liverpool's 3 Beat Records, which in turn signed the track to Pete Waterman's PWL Records; a remix was done by Love Decade, which became the most recognizable version. "I Know" also crossed over to the United States, where it reached number 15 on Billboard's Hot Dance Club Play chart in June 1992, where it was released on Tommy Boy Records. "I Know" would later be sampled by Chase & Status on their 2013 single "Count on Me".

New Atlantic also produced Berri's top 5 UK hit, a dance version of Elkie Brooks' "Sunshine After the Rain". The duo released a number of other records (including the UK No. 70 chart hit "Into the Future") and an album.

Saunders is now part of the DJ production group the Young Punx.

== Discography ==
=== Albums ===
- Global (1993), 3 Beat

=== Singles ===
- "I Know" (1991), 3 Beat - UK #12
- "Into the Future" (featuring Linda Wright) (1992), 3 Beat - UK #70
- "Take Off Some Time" (1993), 3 Beat - UK #64
- "Rude (Drop the Merchandise) / Sunshine" (1993), 3 Beat
- "Fiore" (1993), Festival Records
- "The Sunshine After the Rain" (credited as New Atlantic / U4EA featuring Berri) (1994), Ffrreedom
- "I Know '99" (1999) - UK #77, UK Dance #5
- "Let's Go Down" (featuring Virginia) (2003)
- "Yes to Satan" (2023), Warehouse Wax
