= Bookbinder's Kid =

Studio album by Elkie Brooks
- Released: May 1988
- Recorded: 1988
- Studio: Woody Bay Studios
- Genre: Rock/pop
- Label: Legend
- Producer: Trevor Jordan

Elkie Brooks chronology
The Very Best of Elkie Brooks (1986)	Bookbinder's Kid (1988)	Inspiration (1989)

Bookbinder's Kid is a 1988 album by Elkie Brooks, the follow-up to her top five album No More the Fool.

== Overview ==
After the success of the No More the Fool album, Brooks' new record company was keen to release a follow-up and tracks were chosen during 1987. Prior to recording, Brooks and her sound engineer and husband Trevor Jordan realised that, despite the previous success, money to record the new album was not forthcoming. After learning that profits from No More the Fool had been hidden away in an overseas account, this new album was to be recorded on a fraction of the budget and the record company had lost enthusiasm for the project.

Carrying on regardless, a list of tracks was agreed upon and included covers of "Stairway to Heaven" and Juice Newton's US hit, "Can't Wait All Night". Brooks herself wrote three of the tracks; "Sail On", "Keep It a Secret" and "Kiss Me for the Last Time", the former written with Trevor Jordan. Another track, "What's the Matter Baby", was a cover of the Timi Yuro hit. Yuro was given a copy of the album and personally telephoned Brooks to congratulate her, saying that it was the best version of the song she'd ever heard.

Prior to release, Brooks was told that the album (unlike the previous one) was going to receive no promotion, something which she says is "not the kind of news any artist ever wants to hear [but] sadly, I've heard it all too often". The album charted at a low No.57 in the UK and remained on the chart for three weeks. One single was released, the opening track "Sail On", but this failed to repeat the success of "No More the Fool" by not charting.

Bookbinder's Kid (a reference to Brooks' real name Elaine Bookbinder) was issued on CD, vinyl and cassette in May 1988 through Legend Records. The CD and cassette versions of the album contained bonus tracks, "Only Love Will Set You Free" and "I Can Dream Can't I?". Bookbinder's Kid was re-released in 1998 on CD and cassette by Castle Records.

== Track listing ==
Side one

No.	Title	Writer(s)	Length
1.	"Sail On"	Elkie Brooks; Trevor Jordan
2.	"Stairway to Heaven"	Jimmy Page; Robert Plant
3.	"You Ain't Leavin'"	Jack Conrad; Bobby Garrett
4.	"Keep It a Secret"	Brooks
5.	"When the Hero Walks Alone"	Roy Freeland; Tom Harriman
6.	"Only Love Will Set You Free"	Nick Graham; Bob Mitchell

Side two

No.	Title	Writer(s)	Length
1.	"What's the Matter Baby"	Joy Byer; Clyde Otis
2.	"Can't Wait All Night"	Bryan Adams; Jim Vallance; Kanga
3.	"Kiss Me for the Last Time"	Brooks
4.	"Love is Love"	Kerry Delius
5.	"Foolish Games"	Brendon Taylor; David Leverton
6.	"I Can Dream Can't I?"	Russ Ballard

Note

- "Only Love Will Set You Free" and "I Can Dream Can't I?" available on CD and cassette only.

== Personnel ==
- Elkie Brooks – vocals, piano, keyboards
- London Community Gospel Choir – backing vocals
- Trevor Jordan – piano, keyboard, drums, producer, engineer
- Brendon Taylor – bass guitar, piano, keyboard, drum programming
- Duncan Mackay – piano, keyboard
- David Leverton – guitar
- Paul Bilham – drums
- Tony Heard – drums
- Richard Blanshard – saxophone
- Robbie Jordan – engineer
