= Sembello =

Sembello is a surname. Notable people with the surname include brothers:

- Danny Sembello (1963–2015), American musician, songwriter and record producer
- Michael Sembello (born 1954), American singer, guitarist, keyboardist, songwriter, composer, and producer
- John Anthony Sembello of Dino & Sembello
