= Don't Cry Out Loud =

Don't Cry Out Loud may refer to:

- Don't Cry Out Loud (Melissa Manchester album), a 1978 album by Melissa Manchester
- Don't Cry Out Loud (Elkie Brooks album), a 2007 album by Elkie Brooks
- "Don't Cry Out Loud" (song), a song written by Peter Allen and performed by Elkie Brooks and Melissa Manchester in 1978
