= Berri (singer) =

English singer

Berri (born Rebecca Sleight, 1974, York) is an English singer, best known for her 1994 hit single "The Sunshine After the Rain", which was originally recorded by Ellie Greenwich in 1968 and later was a hit for Elkie Brooks, reaching number 10 in 1977.

"The Sunshine After the Rain" was released twice, peaking at number 26 on the UK Singles Chart in December 1994, and, after a re-release, at number four in September 1995. For the first release, it was credited to New Atlantic/U4EA featuring Berri.

Berri received sole artist credit on the second release, which was the 45th biggest-selling UK single of 1995, and the 77th highest selling single of 1995 in Australia. "The Sunshine After the Rain" was also certified gold in Australia.

Her follow-up single, "Shine Like a Star", peaked at number 20 in the UK in December 1995. An album, About Time, was also released in 1996 in Japan. In 1998, Berri was the featured vocalist on the Hectors House track "Come and Get My Lovin", and contributed vocals to the track "Here Comes the Rain" for Indigo.

In 1999, Berri was the featured vocalist on "Last Night a DJ Saved My Life" by A Few Good Loops.

In 2000, Berri recorded the dance track "Do U Believe" with Plasma. In 2014, Berri provided vocals to "The Perfect Kiss" for Mono Life. In 2017, Berri returned to the stage appearing at the 'Return to the 80s and 90s' festival in Leicester in August 2017.

Afterwards, she worked with a number of bands, including Degrassi, hailing from Tooting Bec. Berri also performed and recorded as part of the folk duo the Raggy Anns.

In 2022, Berri returned to the recording studio working on new material, working with Rick Lloyd of New Atlantic.

Berri appeared on the track "Snap!" from Bright Light Bright Light's 2024 album Enjoy Youth.

Berri continues to perform at music festivals around the UK. In June 2024, Berri's album About Time was released via streaming, marking the first time the album has been available outside of Japan.

== Discography ==
=== Albums ===
- About Time (1998), Intercord Japan - reissued in 2024 as digital download

=== Singles ===
Year	Single	Peak position			Album
Year	Single	UK	AUS	IRE	Album
1994	"The Sunshine After the Rain" (New Atlantic/U4EA featuring Berri)	26	—	—	Single-only
1995	"The Sunshine After the Rain"	4	12	11	About Time
1995	"Shine Like a Star"	20	53	—	About Time
