= The Very Best of Elkie Brooks (1997 album) =

The Very Best of Elkie Brooks (Polygram)

Compilation album by Elkie Brooks
- Released: 1997
- Genre: Rock, pop
- Label: PolyGram

Elkie Brooks chronology
Amazing (1996)	The Very Best of Elkie Brooks (Polygram) (1997)	The Pearls Concert (1997)

The Very Best of Elkie Brooks is a compilation album by Elkie Brooks. Compiled in 1997, it was released on CD and cassette by PolyGram TV.

The album reached number 23 and remained in the UK charts for 7 weeks. It re-entered the charts in 1998.

== Track listing ==
1. "Pearl's a Singer"
2. "No More the Fool"
3. "Don't Cry Out Loud"
4. "Fool (If You Think It's Over)"
5. "I Just Can't Go On"
6. "Sunshine After the Rain"
7. "I Guess That's Why They Call It the Blues"
8. "Nights in White Satin"
9. "Only Love Can Break Your Heart"
10. "Ain't Misbehavin'"
11. "Lilac Wine"
12. "Blue Moon"
13. "If You Leave Me Now"
14. "Goin' Back"
15. "Gasoline Alley"
16. "We've Got Tonight"
17. "Our Love"
18. "Loving Arms"
19. "The Runaway"
20. "Growing Tired"
