= Live with Friends =

Live with Friends may refer to:

- Live with Friends (album), an album by Elkie Brooks
- "Live with Friends" (song), a song recorded by Russell Morris
