= Johnny Parker (jazz pianist) =

British jazz pianist (1929–2010)

- Born: 6 November 1929; Beckenham, Kent, England
- Died: 11 June 2010 (aged 80)
- Genres: Jazz, boogie-woogie
- Occupations: Musician, factory inspector
- Instrument: Piano
- Years active: 1940s–2005
- Label: Parlophone

Johnny Parker (6 November 1929 – 11 June 2010) was a British jazz pianist.

== Early life ==
Parker was born in Beckenham, Kent, England. In 1940, his family moved to Wiltshire, where Parker was exposed to American Forces Network broadcasts, and first heard boogie-woogie piano at a US Air Force base. Parker returned to Beckenham after the Second World War and worked a paper round to be able to buy records by pianists such as Pete Johnson and Albert Ammons.

== Career ==
While in Beckenham, Parker regularly cycled the 10 miles (16 km) Bexleyheath to watch George Webb's Dixielanders perform. Around this time, he joined the Catford Rhythm Club and played at regular sessions. He became the resident pianist, performing at the club until 1948, when he was called up for National Service. He served with the Royal Army Ordnance Corps as an ammunitions examiner, while accompanying jazz musicians such as Beryl Bryden and Mike Daniels.

After his period in the armed forces, Parker enrolled at Regent Street Polytechnic, and – from 1950 to 1951 – played in Mick Mulligan's band. Later in 1951 Parker joined the band of Humphrey Lyttelton and was the pianist on the trumpeter's 1956 hit record "Bad Penny Blues". Parker's piano riff has been cited as similar to (and a possible influence on) Paul McCartney's piano playing on "Lady Madonna". He stayed with Lyttleton for six years, performing with Sidney Bechet and supporting Louis Armstrong and Eddie Condon. In 1965 Parker appeared with the Lyttelton band in a televised programme featuring American blues shouter Big Joe Turner.

After a failed attempt to start his own band, Parker took a position inspecting components at an aircraft assembly plant. He continued playing in jazz bands alongside artists such as Alexis Korner, Diz Disley, Cyril Davies, and Long John Baldry. Parker worked on-and-off in inspection until early 1969, when he joined Kenny Ball's Jazzmen. Parker underwent a spinal operation in December that year, but recovered within months and returned to regular touring.

He performed with Ball until 1978. Subsequently, Parker led his own jazz groups around London and toured the Middle East. He retired in 2005, citing long-term health problems. He died on 11 June 2010.

== Personal life ==
Parker was married twice. He had four children – two (Rebecca and Robert) from his marriage to Maureen Wallis, and two (Abigail and Beverly) from his marriage to South African singer Peggy Phango. Phango, who was the first cousin of Miriam Makeba, died in 1998.
