= Don't Cry Out Loud (Elkie Brooks album) =

Live album by Elkie Brooks
- Released: 25 October 2005
- Recorded: 2004
- Genre: Rock, pop, blues
- Label: Recall Records

Elkie Brooks chronology
Electric Lady (2005)	Don't Cry Out Loud (2005)	Powerless (2010)

Don't Cry Out Loud is a live album by Elkie Brooks, recorded live at the Shepherd's Bush Empire, London, during her 2004 UK tour. It was released on CD in 2005 by Recall Records. The title song "Don't Cry Out Loud" was a hit single for Brooks in 1978.

== Track listing ==
Disc one

1. "I Think I'm Going Back"
2. "Superstar"
3. "The Rose"
4. "Sunshine After the Rain"
5. "Fool If You Think It's Over"
6. "Runaway"
7. "No More the Fool"
8. "Don't Cry Out Loud"
9. "Lilac Wine"
10. "Gasoline Alley"
11. "Nights in White Satin"

Disc 2

1. "Red House"
2. "Back Away"
3. "Muddy Water Blues"
4. "Pearl's a Singer
5. "Shooting Star"
6. "Roadhouse Blues"
7. "Groom's Still Waiting at the Altar"
8. "Baby What Do You Want Me to Do"
9. "Out Of the Rain"
10. "We've Got Tonight"

== Personnel ==
- Elkie Brooks – vocals
- Jean Roussel – keyboards
- Geoff Whitehorn – guitar
- Mike Cahen – guitar
- Mike Richardson – drums
- Brian Badhams – bass guitar
- Lee Noble – backing vocals, percussion
