= Little Egypt (dancer) =

Stage name for popular belly dancers

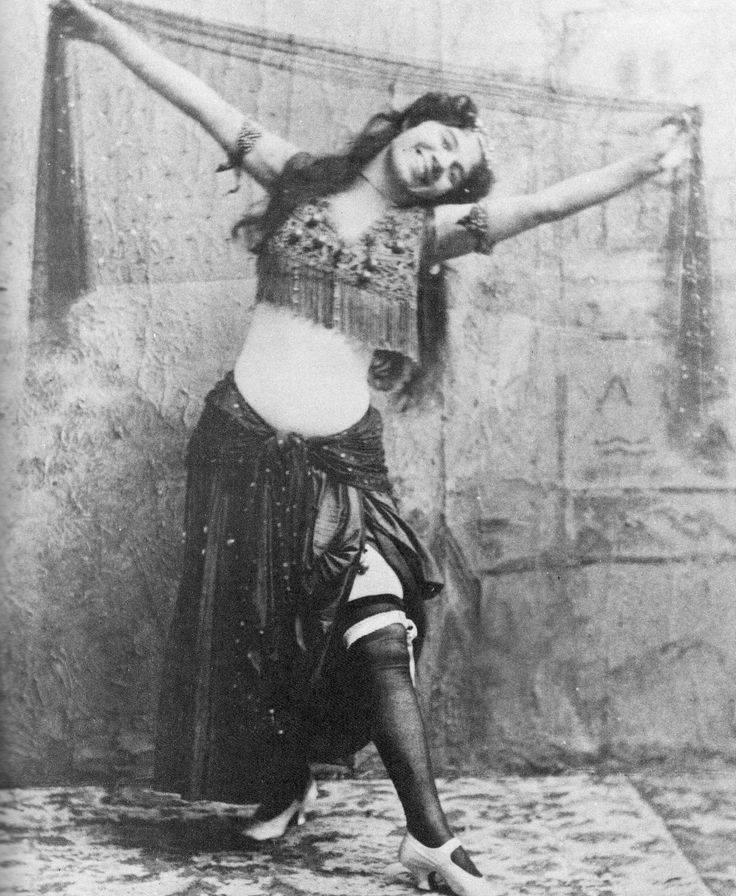
Ashea Wabe is seen here as Little Egypt, in one of a series of photos by Benjamin Falk. 1890s.

Little Egypt was the stage name for at least three popular belly dancers from the late 1800s through the early 1900s. With countless imitators, the name became synonymous with belly dancers.

== Fahreda Mazar Spyropoulos ==
Fahreda Mazar Spyropoulos, (c. 1871 – April 5, 1937), also performing under the stage name Fatima, had her start at the Bird Cage Theatre in Tombstone, Arizona in 1881. In the reopened saloon's lobby hangs a larger-than-life sized painting she donated entitled "Fatima". It bears six patched bullet holes; one can be seen above the belly button and a knife gash in the canvas below the knee.

In 1893, Spyropoulos went to Chicago to appear at the World's Columbian Exposition. Raqs dancers performed for the first time in the United States at the Egyptian Theater on the fair's Midway. Sol Bloom presented the show "The Algerian Dancers of Morocco" at the attraction "A Street in Cairo" produced by Gaston Akoun, which included Spyropoulos, though she was neither Egyptian nor Algerian, but Syrian. The melody that accompanied her dance became famous as the Snake Charmer song. Spyropoulos, the wife of a Chicago restaurateur and businessman who was a native of Greece, was billed as Fatima, but because of her size, she had been called "Little Egypt" as a backstage nickname.

Her husband's name was Alexander Spyropoulos. His restaurant's name was The America and it was located at 705 S. Halsted, in Chicago. They lived together at 1338 s Fairfield Ave. They married in 1906. They had no children. [Chicago Tribune, February 2, 1983]

Spyropoulos gained wide attention, and popularized this form of dancing, which came to be referred to as the "Hoochee-Coochee", or the "shimmy and shake". At that time the word "belly dance" had not yet entered the American vocabulary, as Spyropoulos was the first in the U.S. to demonstrate the "danse du ventre" (literally "dance of the belly") first seen by the French during Napoleon's incursions into Egypt at the end of the 18th century.

Some time after Spyropoulos went to Europe, she performed under the stage name "Little Egypt."

Subsequently, several female dancers adopted the name Little Egypt and toured the United States performing some variation of this dance, until the name became somewhat synonymous with exotic dancers, and was often associated with the Dance of the Seven Veils. Spyropoulos then claimed to be original Little Egypt from the Chicago Fair. Recognized as the true Little Egypt, she disliked being confused with Ashea Wabe, after Wabe's performance at the Seeley banquet in 1896 ended up in her arrest and a full-scale New York City scandal.

Spyropoulos danced as Little Egypt at the 1933 Century of Progress in Chicago at the age of 62.

At the time of her death, she had filed suit against Metro-Goldwyn-Mayer for the use of her name in the motion picture The Great Ziegfeld, claiming that the producers of the movie failed to ask for her consent.

== Ashea Wabe ==
Montreal-born Ashea Wabe (1871 – January 3, 1908) became front-page news in 1896 after she danced at the swank Fifth Avenue bachelor party for Herbert Seeley. A rival promoter reported that Wabe planned to dance nude and the party was raided by the vice squad. Though the raid precluded Wabe from completing her act, she nonetheless admitted to local authorities that she had been paid to dance and pose "in the all-together", a euphemism for having no clothes on. Theodore Roosevelt, then a New York City Police Commissioner, supported the police captain who conducted the raid and was subsequently vilified by the city media for interfering with a party held by upstanding gentlemen. Only later was it revealed that Wabe (a.k.a. Little Egypt) had every intention of performing in the nude and would have done so had the police raid not occurred.

The raid brought some amount of fame to Wabe. In fact, she was hired by Broadway impresario Oscar Hammerstein I to appear as herself in a humorous parody of the Seeley dinner.

On January 5, 1908, she was found dead in her apartment at 236 West 37th Street, New York City, by her sister, having most likely died from gas asphyxiation. She was said to have left an estate of over $200,000.

== Fatima Djamile ==
Fatima Djemille (d. March 14, 1921) appeared at the 1893 Chicago World's Fair.

Fatima was the subject of two early films, Edison's Coochee Coochee Dance (1896) and Fatima (1897).

== Lorraine Shalhoub ==
Lorraine Shalhoub (born December 20, 1931, in Brooklyn) used the name Little Egypt for her acting career.

== Legacy ==
=== Film and television ===
- The American Mutoscope and Biograph Company released three short reels in 1897 with a dancer billed as Little Egypt.
- In the 1940 Mae West movie My Little Chickadee there is a humorous reference to Little Egypt in the dialogue between West's character "Flower Belle", substituting as a teacher, and an elderly pupil called "Pop".
- Little Egypt is a highly fictionalized 1951 film about the legendary World's Fair dancer, produced by Universal International, and starring Rhonda Fleming in the title role.
- In the second episode of the TV series The Waltons, Grandpa Walton says he saw Little Egypt at the Chicago World's Fair.
- In a 1966 episode of the TV show Batman, "Hizzoner the Penguin", dancer character Little Egypt is credited "as Herself".
- In the season 7 episode of the TV show M*A*S*H, "They Call the Wind Korea", Colonel Sherman comments that the camps water tower, "sways in the wind like Little Egypt".

=== Music ===
- Rock and Roll tunesmiths Jerry Leiber and Mike Stoller penned a song entitled "Little Egypt (Ying-Yang)" that was a 1961 hit for The Coasters. In the song, Little Egypt is depicted as a burlesque dancer/stripper, "wearing nothing but a button and a bow". The song has been covered by other artists including Elvis Presley.
- Hank Williams Jr. mentions Little Egypt in his song "Naked Women and Beer".
- Ray Wylie Hubbard mentions both Tempest Storm and Little Egypt in the title track of his album Snake Farm when discussing the singer's girlfriend Ramona who works at a reptile house.

Well a woman I love is named Ramona
She kinda looks like Tempest Storm And she can dance like Little Egypt
She works down at the snake farm

=== Literature ===
Loving Little Egypt is the title of a Thomas McMahon novel, set in the late 19th century.

=== Sports ===
- Angelina Altishin wrestled at GLOW Glorious Ladies of Wrestling as the Little Egypt character in the 80's.

== See also ==
- "The Streets of Cairo, or the Poor Little Country Maid"
