= Bad Penny Blues =

Single by Humphrey Lyttelton And His Band
- B-side: "Close Your Eyes"
- Released: 1956
- Recorded: 20 April 1956, IBC Studios, London
- Genre: Jazz
- Label: Parlophone ER 4184
- Songwriter(s): Humphrey Lyttelton
- Producer(s): Joe Meek for Denis Preston

"Bad Penny Blues" is a fast instrumental blues written by Humphrey Lyttelton and recorded with his band in London on 20 April 1956.

== Popular success ==
It was originally released as Parlophone ER 4184 and became a hit record in Britain at the time.

It was the first British jazz record to get into the Top Twenty, and stayed there for six weeks. Its success was due to the catchy boogie piano riff, played by Johnny Parker and brought to the front by producer Joe Meek. Paul McCartney based his piano part for the Beatles' song "Lady Madonna" on this riff.

The official producer of the record was Denis Preston, who employed Meek as engineer. George Martin was head A&R man of Parlophone at that time, but was not involved in the actual recording.

"Bad Penny Blues" was featured in Mike Figgis' film Red, White & Blues and is on the soundtrack CD of that film.

It was a popular and regular feature of Lyttelton concerts, sometimes played with accompanying riffs by the band. It was recorded again by Lyttelton with Elkie Brooks in 2002, with lyrics added, on their album Trouble in Mind.

== Personnel ==
- Humphrey Lyttelton (trumpet, leader)
- Johnny Parker (piano)
- Jim Bray (bass)
- Stan Greig (drums)
