= Live and Learn (Elkie Brooks album) =

Studio album by Elkie Brooks
- Released: 1979 (UK)
- Recorded: 1979; The Record Plant, Los Angeles, California
- Genre: Rock/funk/pop/soul
- Label: A&M
- Producer: Jerry Leiber & Mike Stoller

Elkie Brooks chronology
Shooting Star (1978)	Live and Learn (1979)	Pearls (1981)

Live and Learn is the fourth studio album by English singer Elkie Brooks, released in 1979.

== Background ==
Released on the back of two singles ("Don't Cry Out Loud" and "The Runaway"), A&M released Live and Learn choosing to omit these songs. Leiber & Stoller returned as producers for the album and gave it a distinct funk and disco feel which, after the middle of the road offerings of the non-album singles, perhaps alienated some of her fanbase. Neither of the singles from this album made the charts which made promotion for this album problematic. As Elkie had become pregnant during the recording, A&M decided to pull back the promotion even further. However, she did continue to perform live until late in her pregnancy.

== Single releases ==
- "He Could Have Been An Army" (1979)
- "Falling Star" (1979)

== Details ==
- Recorded in 1979 at The Record Plant in Los Angeles, USA. Mastered at A&M Studios, Hollywood, USA.
- Live and Learn reached number 34 and remained in the UK charts for 6 weeks.
- Available on CD, paired with its predecessor Shooting Star.

== Track listing ==
1. "Viva La Money" (Allen Toussaint) - (3:23)
2. "On the Horizon" (Jerry Leiber, Mike Stoller) - (3:31)
3. "He Could Have Been an Army" (Mickey Jupp, Leiber, Stoller) - (4:31)
4. "The Rising Cost of Love" (Len Ron Hanks, Zane Grey, Bobby Martin) - (5:01)
5. "Dreamdealer" (Leiber, Stoller, Elkie Brooks, Pete Gage) - (4:01)
6. "Who's Making Love" (Homer Banks, Don Davis, Bettye Crutcher, Raymond Jackson) - (3:37)
7. "If You Can Beat Me Rockin' (You Can Have My Chair)" (Ronald Dunbar, Lamont Dozier, Brian Holland) - (3:22)
8. "The Heartache is On" (Leiber, John Sembello) - (3:24)
9. "Not Enough Lovin' Left" (Elkie Brooks, Pete Gage, Leiber, Stoller) - (3:48)
10. "Falling Star" (Leiber, Stoller) - (4:09)

== Personnel ==
- Elkie Brooks - vocals
- Jean Roussel - keyboards

=== Additional personnel ===
- John Barnes, Mike Stoller - piano/keyboards
- Michael Boddicker - synthesizers
- Marlow Henderson, Spencer Bean, Paul Warren, Oliver Leiber, Fred Tackett, Tim May, Adam Chase Benay - guitars
- Scott Edwards, Ed Watkins Jr, Brian Garofalo - bass guitar
- James Gadson, Ed Greene, Hal Blaine - drums
- Corky Hale - harp
- Lenny Pickett - woodwind
- Tower of Power Horn Section
  - Mic Gillette
  - Greg Adams
  - Lenny Pickett
  - Emilio Castillo
  - Steve Kupka
  - Jim Decker
  - Alan Robinson
  - Marni Robinson.
- Venetta Fields, Darlene Love, Julia Tillman Waters, Maggie Henry, Jim Gilstrap, Oren Waters, Edna Wright - backing vocals
- Michael Stone, Kevin Eddy - engineering
- Bernie Grundman - mastering
- Jerry Leiber & Mike Stoller - production
