= Two Days Away =

Studio album by Elkie Brooks
- Released: 1977 (UK)
- Recorded: 1976
- Genres: Soul, pop, rock
- Label: A&M
- Producers: Jerry Leiber, Mike Stoller

Elkie Brooks chronology
| Rich Man's Woman (1975) | Two Days Away (1977) | Shooting Star (1978) |

Professional ratings
Review scores
| Source | Rating |
|---|---|
| AllMusic | 2/5 stars |
| The Rolling Stone Record Guide | 2/5 stars |

Two Days Away is the second studio album by English singer Elkie Brooks, released in 1977.

== Background ==
Brooks' breakthrough second album, released in 1977, propelled her into solo stardom in the UK and Europe. Including the top ten hits "Pearl's a Singer" and "Sunshine After the Rain", it had a distinct American sound largely due to the work of writers and producers Jerry Leiber and Mike Stoller. It has since been released on CD, paired with its predecessor Rich Man's Woman.

== Single releases ==
- "Pearl's a Singer" (UK #8, 1977)
- "Saved" (1977)
- "Sunshine After the Rain" (UK #10, 1977)
- "Do Right Woman, Do Right Man" (1977)

== Details ==
- Recorded in 1976 at Electric Lady Studios in New York, USA; Record Plant in New York, USA; Air Studios in London, England. Mastered at Masterdisk, New York, USA.
- Two Days Away reached number 16 and remained in the UK charts for 20 weeks.

== Track listing ==
1. "Love Potion No. 9" (Jerry Leiber, Mike Stoller) - 3:42
2. "Spiritland" (Elkie Brooks, Pete Gage) - 3:19
3. "Honey, Can I Put On Your Clothes" (Jean Monte Ray) - 3:22
4. "Sunshine After the Rain" (Ellie Greenwich) - 3:23
5. "Pearl's a Singer" (Leiber, Stoller, Ralph Dino, John Sembello) - 3:39
6. "Mojo Hannah" (Fay Hale, Clarence Paul, Barbara Paul) - 3:00
7. "Do Right Woman, Do Right Man" (Lincoln Moman, Dan Penn) - 3:28
8. "You Did Something For Me" (Leiber, Stoller) - 2:50
9. "Nightbird" (Leiber, Stoller, Pete Gage, Steve York) - 3:06
10. "Saved" (Leiber, Stoller) - 2:40

== Personnel ==
- Elkie Brooks – vocals
- Isaac Guillory – guitars
- Jean Roussel – keyboards
- Trevor Morais – drums
- Steve York – bass

=== Additional personnel ===
- Mike Stoller – piano, keyboards
- Pete Gage, Jerry Friedman, Eric Weissberg – guitars
- George Devens, Carl Hall, Peggy Blue, Morris Pert – percussion
- Corky Hale – harp
- George Devens – vibraphone
- New York Horns
  - Meco Monardo (arranger)
  - Bob Millikam
  - Danny Kahn
  - Barry Rogers
  - Dave Taylor
  - George Young
  - Lew Del Gatto
- Muscle Shoals Horns
  - Harrison Calloway (arranger)
  - Charlie Rose
  - Harvey Thompson
  - Ronnie Eades
- Meco Monardo (arranger), Tony Posk, Guy Lumia, Elliot Rosoff, Rick Sortonne, Carol Webb, Joe Goodman, Julien Barber, Jesse Levy – strings
- Carl Hall, Peggy Blue, Marry Ellen Johnson, Barbara Ingram, Evette Benton, Carla Benson, Jimmy Chambers, George Chandler, Lee Vanderbilt – backing vocals
- Steve Nye, Carmine Rubino – engineering
- Bob Ludwig – mastering
- Jerry Leiber & Mike Stoller – production

== Charts ==
Chart performance for Two Days Away
| Chart (1977) | Peak position |
|---|---|
| Australian Albums (ARIA) | 46 |
| Dutch Albums (Album Top 100) | 19 |
| New Zealand Albums (RMNZ) | 34 |
| UK Albums (Official Charts) | 16 |

== Certifications ==
| Region | Certification | Certified units/sales |
|---|---|---|
| United Kingdom (BPI) | Gold | 100,000^{^} |
^{^} Shipments figures based on certification alone.
