= The Very Best of Elkie Brooks (1986 album) =

Compilation album by Elkie Brooks
- Released: 1986
- Genre: Rock/pop
- Label: Telstar

Elkie Brooks chronology
No More the Fool (1986)	The Very Best of Elkie Brooks (1986)	Bookbinder's Kid (1988)

The Very Best of Elkie Brooks is a compilation album by Elkie Brooks issued on CD, vinyl and cassette in 1986 through Telstar Records. It reached number 10 and stayed in the UK charts for 18 weeks.

== Track listing ==
1. "Pearl's a Singer"
2. "Sunshine After the Rain"
3. "Our Love"
4. "Dance Away"
5. "Only Love Can Break Your Heart"
6. "I Guess That's Why They Call It the Blues"
7. "The Runaway"
8. "Fool (If You Think It's Over)"
9. "Don't Cry Out Loud"
10. "Superstar"
11. "Blue Moon"
12. "Going Back"
13. "Nights in White Satin"
14. "Gloria"
15. "Gasoline Alley"
16. "Lilac Wine"

== Charts ==
Chart positions for MDNA
Chart	Peak
UK Albums (OCC)	10
