= Peggy Phango =

South African actress and singer (1928–1998)

- Born: 28 December 1928; Orlando, Soweto, South Africa
- Died: 7 August 1998 (aged 69); London, England
- Occupations: Actress and singer
- Spouse(s): Johnny Parker, m. 1965
- Children: Two daughters
- Relatives: Miriam Makeba (cousin)

Peggy Phango (28 December 1928 – 7 August 1998) was a South African actress and singer, who from the 1960s was based in England.

== Early life ==
Peggy Phango was born at Orlando, Transvaal, South Africa. She trained as a nurse, but also sang in jazz clubs, as a young woman.

== Career ==
In 1959, Phango was cast to replace her cousin, Miriam Makeba, in the female lead of the musical King Kong, about a South African boxer. Phango first appeared on the London stage in 1961, in the same show. In 1988, she played "Bloody Mary" in a London revival of South Pacific. She was in a vocal group with fellow King Kong cast members, Patience Gowabe and Hazel Futa, called the Velvettes; they sang backup for Cyril Davies and his All-Stars in clubs in the 1960s. She also recorded an album with Dudu Pukwana's band Zila.

Phango also acted in non-musical roles on stage, including such shows as You Can't Take it With You, The Crucible, The Little Foxes, and Fishing, the first play by Paulette Randall. She toured as Rose in Stepping Out in the 1980s, and was one of the South Africans who both appeared in and contributed their personal experiences to the show Ekhaya in 1991.

She appeared on British television regularly, notably in EastEnders and an adaptation of The Growing Pains of Adrian Mole. Her appearances in television dramas about South Africa included roles in Victims of Apartheid (1978), Prisoners of Conscience (1981), The Biko Inquest (1984), and Death is a Part of the Process (1986), the last based on a novel by Hilda Bernstein. Shortly before her death she appeared as the character Mrs Wald in the first episode of a long-running television show, Lynda La Plante's Trial and Retribution.

== Personal life ==
Peggy Phango married English jazz pianist Johnny Parker in 1965, as his second wife. They had two daughters, Abigail and Beverly. Phango died in 1998, aged 69, in London.
