= Amazing (Elkie Brooks album) =

Studio album by Elkie Brooks
- Released: 1996
- Recorded: 1996
- Genre: Pop
- Label: Carlton Classics
- Producer: Trevor Jordan

Elkie Brooks chronology
Circles (1995)	Amazing (1996)	The Very Best of Elkie Brooks (1997)

Amazing is an album by Elkie Brooks.

Recorded in 1996 and released on CD and cassette in 1996 through Carlton Classics, the album reached number 49 and remained in the UK charts for 2 weeks.

== Track listing ==
1. "Nights in White Satin"
2. "One More Heartache"
3. "Our Love"
4. "Lilac Wine"
5. "From the Heart"
6. "Paint Your Pretty Picture"
7. "Gasoline Alley"
8. "Minutes"
9. "Will You Write Me a Song"
10. "Don't Cry out Loud"
11. "Growing Tired"
12. "Round Midnight"
13. "It All Comes Back on You"
14. "We've Got Tonight"
15. "Off the Beaten Track"
16. "No More the Fool"
17. "Only Women Bleed"

== Personnel ==
- Elkie Brooks – vocals
- Andrew Murray – piano, keyboards
- The Royal Philharmonic Orchestra – orchestra
- Trevor Jordan – engineering, production
