= Little Egypt (Ying-Yang) =

Single by The Coasters

from the album Coast Along with the Coasters
- A-side: "Little Egypt (Ying-Yang)
- B-side: "Keep on Rolling"
- Released: 14 Apr 1961
- Recorded: 1961
- Genre: Rock, rhythm and blues
- Length: 2:51
- Label: Atco 6192
- Songwriter: Jerry Leiber and Mike Stoller

The Coasters singles chronology
"Wait a Minute" (1/1961)	"Little Egypt (Ying-Yang)" (1961)	"Girls Girls Girls" (7/1961)

"Little Egypt (Ying-Yang)" is a 1961 rock song written by Jerry Leiber and Mike Stoller and was recorded by the Coasters for their 1962 album, Coast Along with the Coasters. The song reached #16 on the R&B chart and #23 on The Billboard Hot 100 in 1961. The subject of the song is depicted as a burlesque dancer or exotic dancer, "wearing nothing but a button and a bow."

== Cover versions ==
- Elvis Presley in the film and on the 1964 soundtrack album Roustabout and the 1968 NBC Comeback Special
- The Downliners Sect on their 1964 album, The Sect
- Cher and Eric Stoltz, performed in the 1985 film Mask
- Nathan Cavaleri, with Chris Bailey on his 1992 single release
- Mickey Gilley, 1966
- Ray Stevens, 1969
- Kaleidoscope on their 1976 album When Scopes Collide
- Featured in Smokey Joe's Cafe (revue), a jukebox musical featuring the works of Leiber & Stoller
