= Shooting Star (Elkie Brooks album) =

- Cover art by Philip Castle

Studio album by Elkie Brooks
- Released: 1978 (UK)
- Recorded: 1978
- Genre: Rock/funk/pop/soul
- Label: A&M
- Producer: David Kershenbaum

Elkie Brooks chronology
| Two Days Away (1977) | Shooting Star (1978) | Live and Learn (1979) |

Professional ratings
Review scores
| Source | Rating |
|---|---|
| AllMusic | 2/5 stars |

Shooting Star is the third studio album by English singer Elkie Brooks, released in 1978.

== Background ==
Brooks' third album was a departure from her previous work and enjoyed relative success in the UK charts. Taking the place of Leiber & Stoller was producer David Kershenbaum who guided Brooks along a more funk-orientated sound than on her previous work. The album has been released on CD, paired with its 1979 successor Live and Learn.

== Single releases ==
- "Only Love Can Break Your Heart" (UK #43, 1978)
- "Since You Went Away" (1978)
- "Stay With Me" (Germany and Netherlands only, 1978)

== Details ==
- Recorded in 1978 at CBS Studios in London, England, and at Producers Workshop in Los Angeles, USA. Mastered at A&M Studios in Los Angeles.
- Issued on vinyl and cassette in 1978 through A&M Records.
- Shooting Star reached number 20 and remained in the UK charts for 13 weeks.

== Track listing ==
1. "Only Love Can Break Your Heart" (Neil Young) - 3:07
2. "Be Positive" (Elkie Brooks) - 3:50
3. "Since You Went Away" (Jean Roussel, Jerry Knight) - 3:44
4. "Putting My Heart On the Line" (Peter Frampton) - 3:11
5. "Stay With Me" (Ronnie Wood, Rod Stewart) - 3:04
6. "As" (Stevie Wonder) - 4:15
7. "Learn to Love" (Ned Doheny) - 4:04
8. "Too Precious" (Elkie Brooks, Tim Hinkley) - 4:25
9. "Shooting Star" (Pete Gage) - 2:50
10. "Just An Excuse" (Elkie Brooks) - 3:38

== Personnel ==
- Elkie Brooks – vocals
- Elliott Randall – guitars
- Jean Roussel – keyboards
- Andy Newmark – drums
- Jerry Knight – bass, backing vocals

=== Additional personnel ===
- Pete Gage – guitars
- Simon Morton – percussion
- Mike Ross, Andrew Clark, Mark Smith, Ed Schaff – engineering
- Bernie Grundman – mastering
- David Kershenbaum – production

== Charts ==
Chart performance for Shooting Star
| Chart (1978) | Peak position |
|---|---|
| UK Albums (Official Charts) | 20 |

== Certifications ==
| Region | Certification | Certified units/sales |
|---|---|---|
| United Kingdom (BPI) | Silver | 60,000^{^} |
^{^} Shipments figures based on certification alone.
