= Trouble in Mind (Elkie Brooks and Humphrey Lyttelton album) =

Studio album by Elkie Brooks/Humphrey Lyttelton
- Released: 2003 (UK)
- Recorded: 2002
- Genre: Jazz
- Length: 51:40
- Producer: Trevor Jordan

Elkie Brooks/Humphrey Lyttelton chronology
Shangri-La (2003)	Trouble in Mind (2003)	Electric Lady (2005)

Trouble in Mind is an album by Elkie Brooks and Humphrey Lyttelton named for the eight-bar blues song "Trouble in Mind". The album was recorded in 2002 at Woody Bay Studios and released on CD by Classic Studio in 2003.

== Track listing ==
1. "Three Long Years" (Rose Marie McCoy, Connie Ingram)
2. "Trouble in Mind" (Richard M. Jones)
3. "Ev'ry Day I Have the Blues" (Peter Chatman)
4. "I Cried for You" (Gus Arnheim, Arthur Freed, Abe Lyman)
5. "If You're Goin' to the City" (Mose Allison)
6. "Jelly Bean Blues" (Ma Rainey)
7. "Yesterdays" (Jerome Kern, Otto Harbach)
8. "Mister Bad Penny Blues" (Humphrey Lyttelton)
9. "Rocky Mountain Blues" (Frank Haywood, Monroe Tucker)
10. "I'm Gonna Lock My Heart" (Jimmy Eaton, Terry Shand)
11. "Some Other Spring" (Arthur Herzog Jr., Irene Kitchings)
12. "Do Your Duty" (Wesley Wilson)
13. "What's Your Story Mornin' Glory" (Jack Lawrence, Paul Francis Webster, Mary Lou Williams)

== Personnel ==
- Elkie Brooks – vocals
- Humphrey Lyttelton – trumpet, bongos
- Pete Strange – trombone
- Jimmy Hastings – clarinet, flute, saxophone
- Kathy Stobart – saxophones
- Ted Beamont – piano, keyboards
- Mick Hutton – bass guitar
- Adrian Macintosh – drums
