= Round Midnight (Elkie Brooks album) =

Studio album by Elkie Brooks
- Released: 1993
- Recorded: 1993
- Genre: Jazz
- Label: Castle
- Producer: Elkie Brooks

Elkie Brooks chronology
Pearls III (Close to the Edge) (1991)	Round Midnight (1993)	Nothin' But The Blues (1994)

Professional ratings
Review scores
Source	Rating
AllMusic	4/5 stars

Round Midnight is an album by Elkie Brooks. Released on CD and cassette in 1993 through Castle Records, Round Midnight reached number 24 on the UK Albums Chart and remained there for four weeks.

== Track listing ==
1. "All Night Long"
2. "What Kind Of Man Are You?"
3. "Since I Fell for You"
4. "Cry Me a River"
5. "Don't Explain"
6. "Just For a Thrill"
7. "'Round Midnight"
8. "Hard Times"
9. "Black Coffee"
10. "Travelling Light"
11. "Drinking Again"
12. "Here's That Rainy Day"
13. "Save Your Love For Me"
14. "Don't Smoke In Bed"
15. "Crazy He Calls Me"
16. "Spring Can Hang You Up the Most"

== Personnel ==
- Elkie Brooks – vocals
