= Screen Gems (album) =

Studio album by Elkie Brooks
- Released: October 1984 (UK)
- Recorded: 1984
- Genre: Traditional pop
- Label: A&M/EMI
- Producer: Tony Clark

Elkie Brooks chronology
Minutes (1984)	Screen Gems (1984)	No More the Fool (1986)

Screen Gems is a 1984 album by Elkie Brooks comprising Brooks' interpretations of songs from the movies from the 1920s and 1930s. The album's title references all of the selections being introduced, or prominently featured, in mid-20th-century movie releases. It is notable partly for being the first CD album pressed in the UK, by Nimbus at its factory in Hertfordshire in 1984.

== Background ==
Screen Gems was released on October 1, 1984, with vinyl and cassette versions of the album following a month later. Brooks' label A&M Records assigned marketing of the album to EMI, which had recently established a "television exploitation" department. A national televised advertising campaign began at the end of October 1984, coinciding with the vinyl and cassetterelease. Although expected to be Brook's biggest seller to date, the album failed to chart until December 1984 and was not one of Brooks' most successful albums, with a No. 35 peak in the UK Albums Chart – matching that of Brook's precedent album release Minutes – during an 11-week chart run. With Screen Gems Brooks' association with A&M, who had released all of her seven albums, ended. The original CD version of Screen Gems is now a collector's item due to its rarity, selling on eBay for prices in excess of £45.

== Track listing ==
1. "Once in a While" (Michael Edwards, Bud Green)
2. "Am I Blue" (Harry Akst, Grant Clarke)
3. "That Old Feeling" (Sammy Fain, Lew Brown)
4. "Me and My Shadow" (Al Jolson, Dave Dreyer, Billy Rose)
5. "Blue Moon" (Richard Rodgers, Lorenz Hart)
6. "Some of These Days" (Shelton Brooks)
7. "Ain't Misbehavin'" (Fats Waller, Harry Brooks, Andy Razaf)
8. "You'll Never Know" (Harry Warren, Mack Gordon)
9. "What'll I Do?" (Irving Berlin)
10. "My Foolish Heart" (Victor Young, Ned Washington)
11. "Love Me or Leave Me" (Walter Donaldson, Gus Kahn)
12. "Three O'Clock In the Morning" (Julián Robledo, Dorothy Terriss)

== Single releases ==
- "Once in a While" (1984)

== Personnel ==
- Elkie Brooks – vocals
- London Philharmonic Orchestra – orchestra
- Tony Clark – producer, engineer
- Bill Martin – executive producer

== Charts ==
Chart performance for Screen GFems
Chart (1984)	Peak position
UK Albums (Official Charts)	35

== Certifications ==
Region	Certification	Certified units/sales
United Kingdom (BPI)	Gold	100,000^{^}
^{^} Shipments figures based on certification alone.
