= Rich Man's Woman =

Studio album by Elkie Brooks
- Released: 1975 (UK)
- Recorded: Summer 1975
- Studio: Record Plant, Los Angeles
- Genre: Rock
- Label: A&M
- Producer: Kenny Kerner; Richie Wise

Elkie Brooks chronology
Rich Man's Woman (1975)	Two Days Away (1977)

Rich Man's Woman is the debut album by English rock, blues and jazz singer Elkie Brooks, released in 1975 by A&M Records.

== Background ==
Publicity for the album included a promotional week at Ronnie Scott's Jazz Club in London. The picture sleeve featuring a semi-naked Brooks was controversial.

Despite an initial marketing campaign, Rich Man's Woman failed to enter the UK Albums Chart and both A&M and Brooks decided to stop promoting the work to focus on her follow-up album, Two Days Away (1977).

The album has been released on CD, coupled with Two Days Away.

== Single releases ==
- "Where Do We Go from Here" (1975)
- "He's a Rebel" (1975)

== Details ==
- Recorded 1975 at the Record Plant in Los Angeles, California. Mastered at A&M Recording Studios in Hollywood, California.
- Issued on vinyl and cassette in 1975 through A&M Records. Re-released in 1985 on CD, vinyl and cassette through Pickwick Records.

== Track listing ==
All tracks written by Elkie Brooks, except where noted.

No.	Title	Writer(s)	Length
1.	"Where Do We Go from Here (Rich Man's Woman)"		3:45
2.	"Take Cover"	Michael Brown; Ian Lloyd	3:03
3.	"Jigsaw Baby"	Brooks; Bruce Foster	5:18
4.	"Roll Me Over"		3:02
5.	"He's a Rebel"	Gene Pitney	2:55
6.	"One Step on the Ladder"		5:24
7.	"Rock and Roll Circus"	Bob Segarini	4:21
8.	"Try a Little Love"		3:54
9.	"Tomorrow"	David Courtney; Leo Sayer	3:59

== Personnel ==
- Elkie Brooks – vocals
- Steve Burgh – guitars
- Bruce Foster – keyboards
- David Kemper – drums
- Dennis Kovarik – bass

Additional personnel

- David Paich – piano, keyboards
- Michael Boddicker – synthesizers
- Ben Benay – guitars
- Max Bennett – bass guitar
- Alan and Gene Estes – percussion
- John Guerin – drums
- Nino Tempo – saxophone
- Stan Farber, Venetta Fields, Gerry Garrett, Jim Gilstrap, Ron Hicklin, Clydie King, Gene Morford, Verlene Rogers, Jerry Whitman – backing vocals
- Dominic Frontiere, Larry Wilcox – arrangement

Technical

- Warren Dewey, Bob Merritt, Doug Rider – engineering
- Bernie Grundman – mastering
- Kenny Kerner & Richie Wise – production
