= Electric Lady (Elkie Brooks album) =

Studio album by Elkie Brooks
- Released: 14 March 2005
- Recorded: 2004–2005
- Genre: Rock, pop, blues
- Label: Swing Cafe
- Producer: Jermaine Jordan

Elkie Brooks chronology
| Trouble in Mind (2003) | Electric Lady (2005) | Don't Cry Out Loud (2005) |

Electric Lady is an album by Elkie Brooks.

Recorded between 2004 and 2005 at Slave to the Rhythm Studios, it was released on CD in 2005 by Swing Cafe. Little to no promotion and a small distribution meant that the album failed to enter the charts, although it made an impact on the United Kingdom independent album charts.

== Track listing ==
1. "Electric Lady" (Elkie Brooks, Jermaine Jordan) – 3:59
2. "So Good Looking" (Brooks, Jordan) – 3:28
3. "Try Harder" (Brooks, Jordan) – 3:29
4. "Roadhouse Blues" (Morrison, Densmore, Manzarek, Kreiger) – 4:59
5. "White Girl Lost in the Blues" (Brooks, Jordan) – 4:08
6. "The Groom's Still Waiting at the Altar (Bob Dylan) – 4:24
7. "Back Away" (Brooks, Jordan) – 3:48
8. "Muddy Water Blues" (Paul Rodgers) – 4:30
9. "The Brighter Side" (Brooks, Jordan) – 3:58
10. "Out of the Rain" (Tony Joe White) – 4:18
11. "Trailer Trash" (Brooks, Jordan) – 3:42

The album was re-released in January 2021 by Backline Studios and contained five unreleased bonus tracks:

- "Don't Change Horses (In The Middle of the Stream)" (Tower of Power) – 5:08
- "Hard City" (Brooks, Jordan) – 4:16
- "Rocky Road" (Brooks, Jordan) – 3:43
- "The Roamer" (Brooks, Jordan) – 3:43
- "Don't Put Your Hand in the Cookie Jar" (Brooks, Jordan) – 3:52

== Personnel ==
- Elkie Brooks – vocals
- Alan Welch – piano, keyboards
- Geoff Whitehorn – guitar
- Jermaine Jordan – guitar, bass guitar, drums, production
- Steve Jones – saxophone
- Lee Noble – backing vocals
- Trevor Jordan – engineer
