= Nothin' but the Blues (Elkie Brooks album) =

Nothin' But the Blues

Studio album by Elkie Brooks
- Released: 1994
- Recorded: 1994, Woody Bay Studios
- Genre: Blues
- Label: Castle
- Producer: Trevor Jordan, Elkie Brooks

Elkie Brooks chronology
Round Midnight (1993)	Nothin' But the Blues (1994)	Circles (1995)

Nothin' But the Blues is an album by Elkie Brooks.

Mastered by Steve Rooke at Abbey Road Studios and issued on CD and cassette in 1994 through Castle Records, the album reached number 58 and stayed in the UK Albums Chart for two weeks.

== Track listing ==
1. "I Ain't Got Nothin' but the Blues" (Duke Ellington, Don George)
2. "Baby Get Lost" (Bill Moore, Jr.)
3. "Blues for Mama" (Nina Simone, Abbey Lincoln)
4. "Baby What You Want Me to Do" (Jimmy Reed)
5. "Tell Me More and More and Then Some" (Billie Holiday)
6. "I'd Rather Go Blind" (Ellington Jordan, Bill Foster)
7. "I Wonder Who" (Ray Charles)
8. "Ain't No Use" (Rudy Stevenson)
9. "Nobody But You" (Bessie Smith, Willie Dixon, Shields)
10. "I Love Your Lovin' Ways" (Sol Marcus, Bennie Benjamin)
11. "Bad, Bad Whiskey" (Maxwell Davis)
12. "Fine and Mellow" (Billie Holiday)
13. "Me and My Gin" (Harry Burke)
14. "Mean and Evil" (Claude Demetrius, Irene Higginbotham)
15. "Trouble in Mind" (George Jones)
16. "Please Send Me Someone to Love" (Percy Mayfield)

== Personnel ==
- Elkie Brooks – vocals
- Andrew Murray – piano, keyboards
- Tim Mills – guitars, bass guitar
- Mike Richardson – drums
- Duncan Lamont – saxophone
- Derek Healey – trumpet
- Trevor Jordan – engineer, producer
