= Pearls II =

Studio album by Elkie Brooks
- Released: 1982 (UK)
- Recorded: 1982
- Studios: Maison Rouge Studios and CBS Studios, London
- Genre: Rock/pop
- Label: A&M
- Producer: Gus Dudgeon

Elkie Brooks chronology
Pearls (1981)	Pearls II (1982)	Minutes (1984)

Professional ratings
Review scores
Source	Rating
AllMusic	3/5 stars

Pearls II is an album by English singer Elkie Brooks, released in 1982.

== Background ==
The sequel to Brooks' popular Pearls album (1981), A&M decided to play it safe by keeping Gus Dudgeon as producer. Another set of songs, old and new, helped to maintain Brooks' popularity. The album reached number five in the UK Albums Chart and remained on the chart for 25 weeks, where it joined its predecessor which was still riding high. Pearls II was later released on CD in 1993.

Originally, the album had a more rock-orientated feel and included a version of Free's "Be My Friend". However, the label was concerned that this harder direction would alienate Brooks' fans and hurriedly recorded "Loving Arms" as a replacement.

== Track listing ==
No.	Title	Writer(s)	Length
1.	"Goin' Back"	Gerry Goffin; Carole King	4:26
2.	"Our Love"	Graham Lyle; Billy Livsey	3:49
3.	"Gasoline Alley"	Ron Wood; Rod Stewart	3:36
4.	"I Just Can't Go On"	Lee Kosmin	4:07
5.	"Too Much Between Us"	Paul Millns	3:11
6.	"Don't Stop"	Christine McVie	3:13
7.	"Giving You Hope"	Elkie Brooks; Duncan MacKay	3:02
8.	"Money"	Roger Waters	4:43
9.	"Nights in White Satin"	Justin Hayward	4:37
10.	"Loving Arms"	Tom Jans	2:56
11.	"Will You Write Me a Song"	Brooks; Nicholas Portlock; Robert Butterworth; Brooks	4:47

== Charts ==
Chart performance for Pearls II
Chart (1982)	Peak position
Swedish Albums (Sverigetopplistan)	20
UK Albums (Official Charts)	5

== Certifications ==
Region	Certification	Certified units/sales
United Kingdom (BPI)	Platinum	300,000^{^}
^{^} Shipments figures based on certification alone.

== Single releases ==
- "Our Love" (UK #43, 1982)
- "Nights in White Satin" (UK #33, 1982)
- "Will You Write Me a Song" (1982)
- "Gasoline Alley" (UK# 52, 1983)

== Personnel ==
- Elkie Brooks – vocals
- Pete Wingfield, Duncan MacKay – piano/keyboards
- Tim Renwick, Geoff Whitehorn, Martin Jenner – guitars
- John Giblin – bass guitar
- Graham Jarvis, Dave Mattacks, John Lingwood – drums
- Duncan Kinnell, Gus Dudgeon, Graham Jarvis, Frank Ricotti – percussion
- Pete Wingfield, Jimmy Chambers, Katie Kissoon – backing vocals
- Graham Dickson, Philip Barrett, Dave Bascombe, Leigh Mantle – engineers
