= Shangri-La (Elkie Brooks album) =

Studio album by Elkie Brooks
- Released: 2003 (UK)
- Recorded: 2001/02
- Genre: Pop
- Label: Classic Pictures
- Producer: Jermaine Jordan

Elkie Brooks chronology
| The Pearls Concert (1997) | Shangri-La (2003) | Trouble in Mind (2003) |

Shangri-La is an album by Elkie Brooks. Recorded between 2001 and 2002 at Woody Bay Studios, it was released on CD in 2003 by Classic Pictures.

== Track listing ==
1. "Morello"
2. "Naked in September"
3. "Eliyahu"
4. "Don't Be Stupid"
5. "Set Me Free"
6. "Avinu Malkenu"
7. "Strange Fruit"
8. "The Last Goodnight"
9. "Got to Do It Right Away"
10. "Never Known"
11. "Shangri-la"
12. "I Wanna Be (with You)"
13. "Modern Slaves"

== Personnel ==
- Elkie Brooks – vocals
- Jean Roussel – piano, keyboards
- Johnny Dyke – piano, keyboards
- Alan Welch – piano, keyboards
- Al Hodge – guitars
- John Giblin – bass guitar
- Mike Richardson – drums
- Humphrey Lyttelton – trumpet
- Trevor Jordan – engineering
- Jermaine Jordan – production
