= No More the Fool (album) =

Studio album by Elkie Brooks
- Released: November 1986
- Recorded: May–June 1986
- Genres: Rock, pop
- Label: Legend
- Producer: Russ Ballard

Elkie Brooks chronology
Screen Gems (1984)	No More the Fool (1986)	The Very Best of Elkie Brooks (1986)

No More the Fool is a 1986 album by Elkie Brooks. It includes the title track single which became the biggest hit of Brooks' career. Both the album and single peaked at No. 5 on the UK charts in early 1987.

== Overview ==
Having been released from her contract with A&M Records in early 1986, Brooks struck a new deal with smaller label Legend Records, which was distributed by Island. Impressed with their enthusiasm and willingness to promote this new album, Brooks was excited about the project and worked with songwriter Russ Ballard who had had a number of hits to his credit. Ballard had been working on a song called "No More the Fool" which he had earmarked for Kim Wilde, but on hearing it, Brooks' husband and engineer Trevor Jordan instantly claimed the song for her. Ballard wrote some other songs for the album, while Brooks composed two as well as choosing cover versions of "We've Got Tonight" and "Only Women Bleed". The album was completed by "Hold the Dream" which had been the theme to the TV mini-series of the same name.

Gathering together a team of trusted musicians, Brooks recorded the album at her home studio in North Devon, except for the title track which was recorded at Ballard's own studios. It was recorded during May and June 1986 just as Brooks discovered she was pregnant. Because of this, pre-promotion was pulled forward to October with live and personal appearances being undertaken while heavily pregnant, Legend Records meanwhile heralded the album with advertising on buses and in tube stations.

Released a month later, the album marked the peak of Brooks' career. The lead single "No More the Fool" was a big comeback hit for her, reaching No.5 in the UK Singles Chart in January 1987. This album also reached No. 5 at the same time, while a compilation album, The Very Best of Elkie Brooks, was at No. 10 in the charts. Brooks had given birth in late December and therefore was back to performing on TV including appearances on Top of the Pops soon afterwards. A promotional tour in Germany was also undertaken at this time. Brooks later recalled that having a baby boy at this time meant that she did not fully appreciate the success she was experiencing. Two more singles were released from the album, a remixed version of "Break the Chain" and "We've Got Tonight", which became more modest hits peaking at numbers 55 and 69 respectively. No More the Fool remained on the UK album chart for 23 weeks.

A cruel twist emerged from the album however as when 18 months later Brooks was to release the follow-up album, she discovered that despite huge earnings from the album, she still had not received any royalties. Looking into it, the profits showed up as zero. The record company had shipped production of the album out to Germany, which then linked to a separate account held in Panama, meaning that the UK account of the record company showed only a debt of £132,000 in recording costs. To add to this, Legend Records later sold the rights to Polydor Records for £500,000 - which was declared at covering the cost of recording and other extras. Brooks looked into the matter with solicitors but reluctantly bowed down due to the cost of legal proceedings against the chances of winning. She later remarked "This was the business end of it, which I've always hated and I still do to this day". Although aware that these things happen quite often in the music business, she declared that the artist is an innocent party and "it should be stopped because it's totally wrong".

== Track listing ==
Side one

1. "No More the Fool" (Russ Ballard)
2. "Only Women Bleed" (Alice Cooper, Dick Wagner)
3. "No Secrets (Call of the Wild)" (Jimmy Scott, Julia Downes)
4. "Blue Jay" (Elkie Brooks, Trevor Jordan)
5. "Break the Chain" (Russ Ballard)

Side two

1. "We've Got Tonight" (Bob Seger)
2. "All or Nothing" (Russ Ballard)
3. "Don't Want to Cry No More" (Russ Ballard)
4. "Hiding Inside Yourself" (Elkie Brooks)
5. "Hold the Dream" (Barrie Guard)

== Single releases ==
- "No More the Fool" (UK #5, 1986)
- "Break the Chain" (single remix) (UK #55, 1987)
- "We've Got Tonight" (UK# 69, 1987)

== Personnel ==
- Elkie Brooks - vocals
- Russ Ballard, Mickey Simmonds, Chris Allison, Duncan Mackay, Nick Glennie-Smith - piano, keyboards
- Russ Ballard, Zal Cleminson, Ian Crighton, Clem Clempson, Gary Hutchins - guitars
- Mo Foster, Brad Lang, Graham Edwards, Felix Krish - bass guitar
- Mike Richardson, Julia Downes, Tony Beard, Morris Pert - drums, percussion
- Martin Dobson, Gary Barnacle - saxophone
- Steve Lang, Peter Straker Morty - backing vocals
- Trevor Jordan, Russ Ballard, Matt Butler, Steve Reece, Marcellus Frank, Brad Davies, Richard Sullivan - engineers

== Charts ==
Chart performance for No More the Fool
Chart (1987)	Peak position
UK Albums (Official Charts)	5

== Certifications ==
Region	Certification	Certified units/sales
United Kingdom (BPI)	Gold	100,000^{^}
^{^} Shipments figures based on certification alone.
