= Sunshine After the Rain =

1968 song by Ellie Greenwich

"Sunshine After the Rain" is a song originally written and recorded by Ellie Greenwich in 1968, titled as "The Sunshine After the Rain" and released on her album Composes, Produces and Sings. It was covered by Elkie Brooks in 1977 and interpolated by Berri in 1994.

== Elkie Brooks version ==
"Sunshine After the Rain"

Single by Elkie Brooks

from the album Two Days Away
- B-side: "Spiritland"
- Released: 1977
- Length: 3:23
- Label: A&M
- Songwriter: Ellie Greenwich
- Producer: Jerry Leiber and Mike Stoller

Elkie Brooks singles chronology
"Saved" (1977)	"Sunshine After the Rain" (1977)	"Do Right Woman, Do Right Man" (1977)

Brooks' version was released as a single in 1977 and reached number 10 on the UK Singles Chart. The song appears as the fourth track on her 1977 album Two Days Away.

=== Track listing ===
- UK 7-inch single
1. "Sunshine After the Rain" – 3:23
2. "Spiritland" – 3:19

=== Charts ===
Chart (1977)	Peak position
Australia (Kent Music Report)	100
Ireland (IRMA)	7
UK Singles (Official Charts)	10

== Berri version ==
"The Sunshine After the Rain"

Single by Berri

from the album About Time
- Released: 14 November 1994 (as New Atlantic/U4EA featuring Berri); 21 August 1995 (as Berri)
- Genre: Eurodance; dance-pop
- Length: 3:28
- Label: Ffrreedom
- Songwriter: Ellie Greenwich
- Producers: Richard Lloyd; Neil Bowser

Berri singles chronology
"The Sunshine After the Rain" (1994)	"Shine Like a Star" (1995)

In 1994, English singer Berri recorded her version which interpolates only the chorus throughout. It also contains an interpolation of "I Feel Love" by Donna Summer.

=== Background ===
An earlier breakbeat hardcore version titled "Sunshine" was first released by U4EA in 1992 on the 3 Beat label. It was later reworked by New Atlantic in 1994 and titled "The Sunshine After the Rain", now credited to "New Atlantic/U4EA featuring Berri". This release reached number 26 on the UK Singles Chart in December 1994. A re-release in 1995 fared somewhat better, peaking at number four on the UK Singles Chart in September, this time credited solely to Berri. The re-release also became a hit in Australia, peaking at number 12 on the ARIA singles chart, and in Iceland and Ireland, reaching number 11 in both countries. The accompanying music video was a Box Top on British music television channel The Box for 4 weeks in September 1995.

=== Critical reception ===
Larry Flick from Billboard magazine complimented songs like "Sunshine After the Rain" as "such juicy European morsels", adding that it "[has] the infectious hooks and tidy production required for a successful crossover to top 40 waters." James Hamilton from Music Week's RM Dance Update described it as a "smashbound fluttery galloping anthemic raver full of girl chorused infectious optimism". In 1995, he named it a "plaintive anthemic galloping remake". Grandmaster Mark from Smash Hits gave the song a score of four out of five, writing, "This is a high energy, N-Trance/Time Frequency-style groove spoilt only by weak vocals. A memorable dance-pop tune that deserves to be huge."

=== Track listings ===
- 1994 CD single as New Atlantic/U4EA featuring Berri
1. "The Sunshine After the Rain" (Two Cowboys 7" edit) — 3:31
2. "The Sunshine After the Rain" (New Atlantic mix) — 6:31
3. "The Sunshine After the Rain" (original U4EA breakbeat mix) — 5:24
4. "The Sunshine After the Rain" (Two Cowboys 12" mix) — 4:29
5. "The Sunshine After the Rain" (Tall Paul remix) — 6:34
- 1995 CD single as Berri
1. "The Sunshine After the Rain" (Two Cowboys club edit) — 3:30
2. "The Sunshine After the Rain" (Two Cowboys club mix) — 4:27
3. "The Sunshine After the Rain" (Dancin' Divaz club mix) — 8:00
4. "The Sunshine After the Rain" (Dancin' Divaz rhythm mix) — 6:31

=== Charts ===
==== Weekly charts ====
Chart (1994)	Peak position
Italy (Musica e dischi)	17
UK Singles (Official Charts)	26
UK Club Chart (Music Week)	28

Chart (1995)	Peak position
Australia (ARIA)	12
Europe (Eurochart Hot 100)	23
Europe (European Dance Radio)	22
Iceland (Íslenski Listinn Topp 40)	11
Ireland (IRMA)	11
Scottish Singles Sales (Official Charts)	3
UK Singles (Official Charts)	4
UK Dance (Official Charts)	3
UK Airplay (Music Week)	17
UK Pop Tip Club Chart (Music Week)	7

==== Year-end charts ====
Chart (1995)	Position
Australia (ARIA)	77
UK Singles (OCC)	45
UK Pop Tip Club Chart (Music Week)	46

=== Certifications ===
Region	Certification	Certified units/sales
Australia (ARIA)	Gold	35,000^{^}
United Kingdom (BPI)	Silver	200,000^{^}
^{^} Shipments figures based on certification alone.

== "Rainbow in the Sky" ==
In 1995, DJ Paul Elstak produced a happy hardcore track titled "Rainbow in the Sky". The "K&A Blast" versions very closely resemble the Berri version of "Sunshine After the Rain". "Rainbow in the Sky" was released in the UK on 12" vinyl and CD. The "Rainbow in the Sky" CD single also contained Paul Elstak's single, "Luv U More".

=== Charts ===
==== Weekly charts ====
Chart (1995–96)	Peak position
Netherlands (Dutch Top 40)	3
Netherlands (Single Top 100)	3
Belgium (Ultratop 50 Flanders)	33
UK Singles (OCC)	130

==== Year-end charts ====
Chart (1995)	Position
Netherlands (Dutch Top 40)	35
Netherlands (Single Top 100)	13
