= No More the Fool =

1986 single by Elkie Brooks

Single by Elkie Brooks

from the album No More the Fool
- B-side: "City Lights"; "Blue Jay"
- Released: 10 November 1986
- Length: 4:40
- Label: Legend
- Songwriter: Russ Ballard
- Producer: Russ Ballard

Elkie Brooks singles chronology
"Once in a While" (1984)	"No More the Fool" (1986)	"Break the Chain" (1987)

Audio
- "No More the Fool" on YouTube

"No More the Fool" is a song by English singer Elkie Brooks. Released in November 1986 as the lead single from her album of the same name, it reached number five on the UK Singles Chart, becoming the highest-charting single of her career.

== History ==
The song was written by English producer and songwriter Russ Ballard, whom Elkie Brooks' new label Legend Records commissioned to make an album with her. He had originally intended the song for Kim Wilde, but was persuaded to give it to Brooks. As the singer recalls in her book Finding My Voice, when she and her husband, Trevor Jordan, went with Mike Heap of Legend Records to meet Ballard in his house, he showed them three songs they didn't like. And then Jordan asked: "What else are you working on, Russ?" "I’ve been writing this song for Kim Wilde," said Ballard and showed them "No More the Fool". Brook's husband and Mike Heap were instantly "blown away". "That’s it!," said Jordan when Ballard stopped singing. "But I’ve written this for Kim Wilde," said Ballard protestingly. "No you haven’t. You’ve written it for Elkie Brooks," replied Jordan.

Brooks initially wasn't as impressed by the song as her husband and Mike Heap were. But when she later tried singing it, she was satisfied with the result. "Trevor always says that I never jump up and down about a new song, but I guess that’s just me. I think the acid test of a song is always if you can sit and sing it yourself with only piano accompaniment, and it sounds great. Then you know that with everything else added in the mixing, it will sound amazing. ‘No More The Fool’ passed that test on both counts," she explains.

The whole album would be built around this song: "I knew we had a big new song on our hands and so we got stuck into choosing the rest of the tracks of the album," Brooks recalls. Unlike the rest of the album, recorded in Brooks' and Jordan's secluded country house in North Devon on the quadrophonic Mavis mixing console that Jordan originally built for Pink Floyd, the song "No More the Fool" was recorded at Ballard's house.

== Track listings ==
7-inch single
No.	Title	Writer(s)	Length
1.	"No More the Fool"	Russ Ballard	4:40
2.	"City Lights"	Elkie Brooks; Trevor Jordan

12-inch single
No.	Title	Writer(s)	Length
1.	"No More the Fool"	Ballard
2.	"City Lights"	Brooks; Jordan
3.	"Blue Jay"	Brooks; Jordan

== Charts ==
=== Weekly charts ===
Chart (1986–1987)	Peak position
Europe (Eurochart Hot 100)	40
UK Singles (Official Charts)	5

=== Year-end charts ===
Chart (1987)	Position
UK Singles (OCC)	100
