= Pearl's a Singer =

1977 Elkie Brooks song

Single by Elkie Brooks

from the album Two Days Away
- B-side: "You Did Something for Me"
- Released: 25 February 1977
- Recorded: 1976
- Genre: Blues rock, soft rock
- Length: 3:39
- Label: A&M
- Songwriters: Jerry Leiber, Mike Stoller, Ralph Dino, John Sembello
- Producers: Jerry Leiber, Mike Stoller

Elkie Brooks singles chronology
"He's a Rebel" (1976)	"Pearl's a Singer" (1977)	"Saved" (1977)

Official video
- "Pearl's a Singer" on YouTube

"Pearl's a Singer" is a song by English singer Elkie Brooks, as taken from her 1977 album Two Days Away which was produced by the song's co-writers Jerry Leiber and Mike Stoller. The original version of "Pearl's a Singer" had been introduced by the duo Dino and Sembello – also the song's co-writers – on their 1974 self-titled album which Leiber and Stoller had produced.

The song is a ballad, telling the story of a failed singer who still dreams of the success she might have had.

== History ==
Brooks would recall that at a rehearsal session for her Two Days Away album "Jerry Leiber [said]: 'I want to play you this song, I don't think you're going to like it, it's too countryish for you but I'll play it for you anyway.'...I said: 'Go on, I've got an open mind, I like a lot of country [music].' I listened to 'Pearl's a Singer' and told [Leiber & Stoller] I liked it but that they needed to [modify it with] a middle section. To which Jerry said: 'No problem'. And with that he disappeared and came back half an hour later with the [modified] version of 'Pearl's a Singer'" which Brooks recorded. Brooks - "To be honest [in the mid-1970s] I just wanted to enjoy myself in music and I never thought 'Pearl...' was going to be a big hit but [after] it was released on my birthday in 1977 the record company really pushed it, [it] got played on all the radio stations and became very successful. No one was more surprised than me."

== Chart performance ==
"Pearl's a Singer" afforded Elkie Brooks her debut chart single – thirteen years after she'd recorded her first track – reaching No. 8 on the UK Singles Chart in spring 1977. It remained her highest placing in that chart until "No More the Fool" reached No. 5, in early 1987.

== Personnel ==
- Elkie Brooks – vocals
- Isaac Guillory – guitars
- Jean Roussel – keyboards, arranger
- Trevor Morais – drums
- Steve York – bass

=== Additional personnel ===
- Mike Stoller – keyboards
- Eric Weissberg – guitars
- George Devens – percussion
- Muscle Shoals Horns
  - Harrison Calloway (arranger)
  - Charlie Rose
  - Harvey Thompson
  - Ronnie Eades
- Meco Monardo (arranger), Tony Posk, Guy Lumia, Elliot Rosoff, Rick Sortonne, Carol Webb, Joe Goodman, Julien Barber, Jesse Levy – strings
- Carl Hall, Peggy Blue, Marry Ellen Johnson – backing vocals

== Charts ==
=== Weekly charts ===
Chart (1977)	Peak position
Australia (Kent Music Report)	65
Belgium (Ultratop 50 Flanders)	23
Belgium (Ultratop 50 Wallonia)	44
Europarade Top 30	17
Ireland (IRMA)	9
Netherlands (Dutch Top 40)	12
Netherlands (Single Top 100)	11
New Zealand (Recorded Music NZ)	11
Portugal Music Week International Chart	8
UK Singles (Official Charts)	8

=== Year-end charts ===
Chart (1977)	Position
Netherlands (Dutch Top 40)	91
Netherlands (Single Top 100)	95
