= Dino & Sembello =

Ralph F. Palladino (born April 1938), known as Ralph Dino, and John Anthony Sembello (February 22, 1945 - May 1, 2013), were an American singing and songwriting duo in the early 1970s. They recorded one album together, which included the original version of the song "Pearl's a Singer", co-written with leading songwriters and record producers Jerry Leiber and Mike Stoller, and later a hit in the UK for Elkie Brooks.

== Career ==
Dino and Sembello, both from Philadelphia, co-wrote three tracks on The Lovin' Spoonful's 1969 album Revelation: Revolution '69 and wrote together for The Turtles, Sergio Mendes and Tim Hardin. They first recorded together in 1970, releasing the single "See the Light" on the Date label, a subsidiary of Columbia Records.

In 1974, they worked with Leiber and Stoller, and released the album Dino & Sembello on the A&M label. All the songs were jointly credited to Dino, Sembello, Leiber and Stoller, and were produced by Leiber and Stoller. The songs included the singles "Dancin' Jones" / "Jump the Canyon" and "The Best Thing" / "Pearl's a Singer". "The Best Thing" was recorded by Peggy Lee, and became a minor R&B hit for Billy Eckstine in 1976. The following year "Pearl's a Singer" was recorded by English singer Elkie Brooks, also produced by Leiber and Stoller, and reached no.8 on the UK singles chart. Both "Pearl's a Singer" and another song from the album, "Neighborhood", featured in the musical revue of Leiber and Stoller's songs, Smokey Joe's Cafe.

From 1979, Ralph Dino worked as a performer and songwriter with pianist Larry DiTommaso. They wrote "She's Over Me", recorded by Teddy Pendergrass in 1981, and in 1985 wrote Jermaine Jackson's hit "Do What You Do", which reached no.13 on the Billboard Hot 100 and no.6 on the UK singles chart. The recording won a gold record, and was recognized by ASCAP as one of the most performed songs of 1985. The pair reunited to perform in 2014. Today, Dino is also the President of RaRaLa Music.

John Sembello was the brother of musicians Michael and Danny Sembello. He later co-wrote the song "Eye to Eye" with his two brothers and Don Freeman. Included on Chaka Khan's 1984 album I Feel for You, the song reached No. 16 on the UK singles chart in 1985. John Sembello died in 2013 at the age of 68.
