= Lilac Wine =

Song composed by James Shelton

Single by Elkie Brooks

from the album Pearls
- Released: January 1978
- Recorded: 1978
- Genre: Adult contemporary
- Length: 3:54
- Label: A&M
- Songwriter: James Shelton
- Producer: Mike Batt

"Lilac Wine"

Song by Jeff Buckley

from the album Grace
- Released: August 23, 1994
- Recorded: 1993
- Studio: Bearsville Studios (Woodstock, New York)
- Genre: Folk; alternative rock; art rock
- Length: 4:32
- Label: Columbia
- Songwriter: James Shelton
- Producer: Andy Wallace

"Lilac Wine" is a song written by James Shelton (lyrics and music) for the 1950 Broadway musical Dance Me a Song. It was sung in the show by Hope Foye but (as the show was not successful) there was no cast recording.

== Lyrics ==
The lyrics form a narrative of heartache at losing a lover and taking solace from wine made from a lilac tree. The song focuses on the blissful oblivion achieved by becoming intoxicated. Its inspiration was a line in the 1925 novel Sorrow in Sunlight by Ronald Firbank, in which the main character, Miami Mouth, circulates through a party "offering a light, lilac wine, sweet and heady".

== Cover versions ==
"Lilac Wine" has been recorded by a number of artists including Eartha Kitt on her 1953 album That Bad Eartha, Helen Merrill in her album Helen Merrill with Strings (1955), Judy Henske on her debut self-titled album (1963), Nina Simone on her album Wild Is the Wind (1966), and Jeff Buckley on his album Grace (1994). Elkie Brooks released a cover in 1978, and it eventually featured on her Pearls album, produced by Mike Batt. The album stayed in the UK albums chart for 79 weeks, and the song featured on several subsequent albums. The Jeff Buckley version was used as background music in the 2006 French film Tell No One. It also appears on Katie Melua's debut studio album Call Off the Search (2003), the live album Live at the O² Arena (2009) and the video album Katie Melua with the Stuttgart Philharmonic Orchestra (2011). Barb Jungr recorded a version for her 2008 tribute album to Nina Simone, Just Like a Woman. Jeff Beck played a solo in the version included on Emotion & Commotion (2010) with vocals by Imelda May. Miley Cyrus released it as a video in 2012, as part of her YouTube series, Backyard Sessions. The song was recorded by Dave Gahan and Soulsavers for their 2021 album Imposter.

The only artist to have major chart success with the song was Elkie Brooks, and the song remains closely associated with her, especially in the UK and Europe. Her rendition peaked at No. 16 in the UK singles chart in 1978. It was included on her 1981 album, Pearls.

In 2026, a version of the song performed by Pakistani singer Arooj Aftab and American singer Beck featured on the War Child album Help(2).

Ana Moura, a Portuguese Fado singer, included it on her album Moura. It was the choice of Cerys Matthews on an edition of BBC Radio 4's 'Add to Playlist'.

== Charts ==
Chart (1978)	Peak	ref.
Irma Irish Singles Charts	8	
Netherlands Dutch Single Top 100	50	
Netherlands Dutch Top 40	33	
UK singles chart	16	
