= Elkie Brooks =

English singer (born 1945)

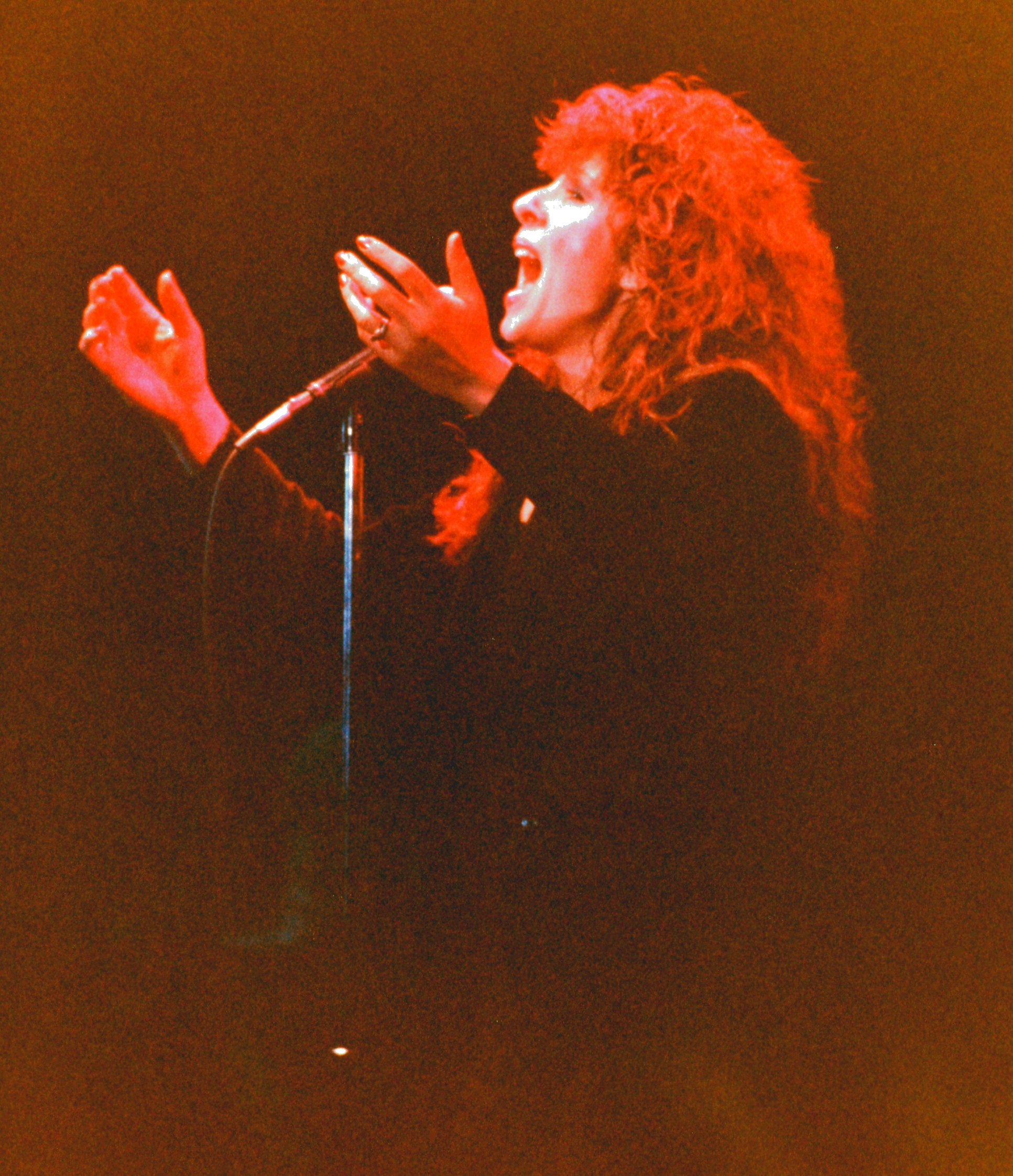
- Brooks performing at the Coventry Apollo in 1983

Background information
- Born: Elaine Bookbinder; 25 February 1945 (age 81); Salford, Lancashire, England
- Genres: Rock; blues; jazz; blues rock
- Occupation: Singer
- Years active: 1960–present
- Labels: Island; A&M
- Formerly of: Vinegar Joe; Wet Willie; Dada
- Website: elkiebrooks.com

Elkie Brooks (born Elaine Bookbinder; 25 February 1945) is an English rock, blues and jazz singer. She was a vocalist with the bands Dada and Vinegar Joe, and later became a solo artist. She gained her biggest success in the late 1970s and 1980s, releasing 13 UK Top 75 singles, and reached the top ten with "Pearl's a Singer", "Sunshine After the Rain" (both 1977), "Fool (If You Think It's Over) (1981), and "No More the Fool" (1986). She has been nominated twice for the Brit Awards.

Brooks is a Gold Badge Award of Merit winner from the British Academy of Songwriters, Composers and Authors (BASCA) (now The Ivors Academy) and is generally referred to as the "British Queen of Blues".

== Life and career ==
=== Early career and Vinegar Joe ===
Brooks was born Elaine Bookbinder in Salford, to a Jewish family. Her father's grandparents emigrated to Britain from Poland at the start of the 20th century to escape the pogroms. Her older brothers are Raymond Bookbinder and Anthony Bookbinder (Tony Mansfield of The Dakotas).

Whilst still a child, Brooks began singing at barmitzvahs and weddings; according to Brooks, her unofficial debut was a gig at a club called the Laronde on Cheetham Hill Road, Manchester, when she was 13. Aged 15, she won a talent contest in Manchester, leading to her taking part in a pop package tour which was promoted by Don Arden. Her first record, a cover of Etta James's "Something's Got a Hold on Me", was released on Decca in 1964. Brooks spent most of the 1960s on Britain's cabaret scene, a period of her life that she did not particularly enjoy. In the mid 1960s, she supported the Beatles in their Christmas show in London, then, as an established act, helped the Small Faces in their early career by introducing them at several venues. She went on to tour the United States with several bands, including the Animals. She also toured the then communist Poland with the Artwoods (which included her then boyfriend Jon Lord).

In the 1960s, Brooks had begun singing jazz with Humphrey Lyttelton's band, but subsequently changed direction musically. After she met Pete Gage, whom she would marry, she joined the short-lived blues rock fusioneers Dada, before forming Vinegar Joe with Gage and Robert Palmer. Brooks gained the reputation as the wild woman of rock 'n' roll, due to her wild stage performances. After three albums, Vinegar Joe split up in 1974, and Brooks and Palmer pursued separate solo careers. After a time as backing singer with the American southern boogie band Wet Willie, she returned to England.

=== Solo career and chart success ===
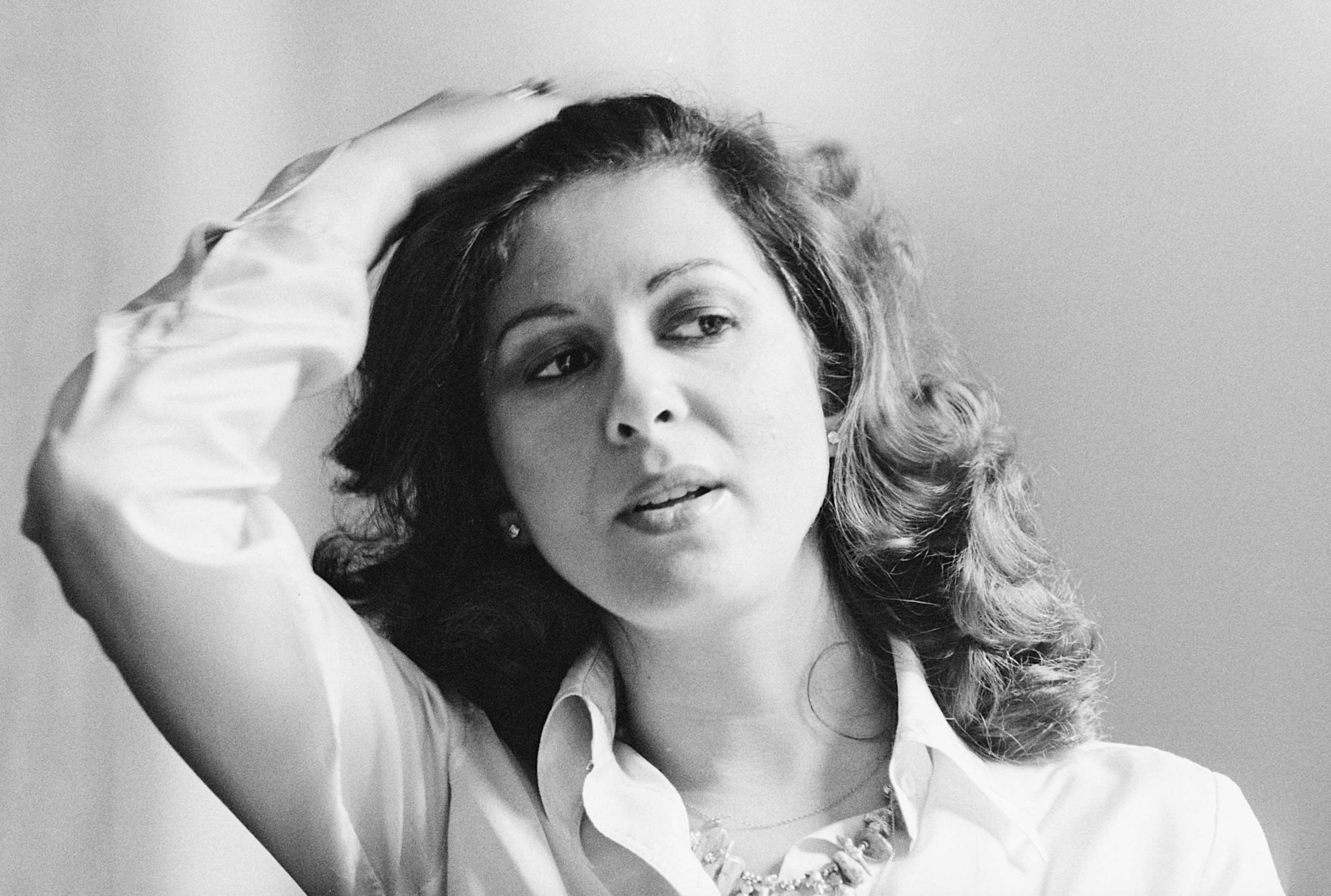
Brooks in Amsterdam, 1977

Brooks' first solo album, released on A & M Records, was Rich Man's Woman (1975). It was released to critical acclaim, but the album's cover shot of a naked Brooks with a feather boa was considered outrageous for the time.

This came before a run of 16 albums in 20 years, starting with Two Days Away (1977), produced by the songwriting duo Jerry Leiber and Mike Stoller, who had previously worked with Elvis Presley; Brooks also wrote tracks with Leiber and Stoller. The hits "Pearl's a Singer" (reaching No. 8 in the UK Singles Chart) and "Sunshine After the Rain" (which reached No. 10) came from this album. 1977 also saw Brooks duet with Cat Stevens on the song "Remember the Days of the Old Schoolyard" which reached No.33 on the Billboard charts and No.44 in UK. The albums Shooting Star (1978) and Live and Learn (1979) also saw success, along with the singles "Lilac Wine" produced and arranged by Mike Batt and "Don't Cry Out Loud". Her polished, powerful cover of Gallagher and Lyle's "The Runaway" saw the Scottish singer-songwriters appear with Brooks on Top of the Pops to provide backing vocals.

In 1980, Brooks performed at the Knebworth Festival with The Beach Boys, Santana and Mike Oldfield. The Pearls album, released in 1981, was the biggest commercial success of her career, charting for 79 weeks and reaching No. 2 in the UK Albums Chart. The album was still in the charts a year later, when Pearls ll (1982) reached No. 5, spending 26 weeks on the charts. The Gus Dudgeon-produced "Fool If You Think It's Over (1981)", written by Chris Rea, was a major hit single for Brooks. Other chart singles followed, with "Our Love", "Nights in White Satin" and "Gasoline Alley", all produced by Dudgeon. The 1984 albums Minutes and Screen Gems were both chart hits in the same year. In 1986, Brooks sang the title theme song for the BBC television series A Very Peculiar Practice. Written by Dave Greenslade, it was never released commercially.

In early 1987, the song "No More the Fool" reached the top five for Brooks, and became her biggest hit single to date, with the parent album also reaching the top five. This led to her achieving another career peak, with two albums in the top ten and a single in the top ten in the same week. More chart success ensued with the albums The Very Best of Elkie Brooks (1986), Bookbinder's Kid (1988), Inspiration (1989), Round Midnight (1993), Nothin' but the Blues (1994), Amazing (1996) and The Very Best of Elkie Brooks (1997).

=== Later work ===
In March 2003, Brooks participated in the ITV music talent show Reborn in the USA, alongside musicians such as Peter Cox and Leee John. The same year, the album Trouble in Mind was released, which saw her collaborate with Humphrey Lyttelton, with whom she had worked earlier in her career, and his Band. The album included "Bad Penny Blues" with added lyrics. The Electric Lady album (2005), produced by her son Jermaine Jordan, saw a return to her blues and rock roots, featuring self-penned tracks alongside re-workings of numbers by the Doors, Bob Dylan, Paul Rodgers and Tony Joe White. The following year saw the release of her first official DVD, Elkie Brooks & Friends: Pearls, featuring an array of guest musicians.

Brooks's twentieth studio album, Powerless, also produced by Jordan, was released in 2010, featuring songs such as Prince's "Purple Rain" and Dylan's "Make You Feel My Love". She continues to perform live throughout the UK and Ireland. In 2012, Brooks released her autobiography Finding My Voice, published by The Robson Press. In it, she detailed her life and career, focusing on her love of performing live and the downsides of the recording business, which she says has often left her financially no better off.

In July 2017, after Brooks signed to Virgin EMI, the album Pearls – The Very Best Of, was released. It charted at No. 14, and included two new singles: "Love Ain't Something that You Can Get for Free" and the Phil Thornalley and Bryan Adams-penned "Forgive and Forget". Later in the year, a remix of the 1979 album track "The Rising Cost of Love" was also released as a single. All three singles made it onto the Radio 2 'A' playlist, with "Forgive and Forget" being the network's "Record of the Week." Brooks promoted the album with several appearances on Radio 2 programmes, including the Aled Jones Show, and The One Show on BBC One. On 19 September that year, Brooks appeared at the London Palladium to mark 40 years since her first sell-out week at the venue in 1977. The show also celebrated her 40 years of success since the release of the single "Pearl's a Singer".

The same year, Brooks recorded the closing theme song for the 2017 film Finding Your Feet, which starred Imelda Staunton, Timothy Spall, Celia Imrie and Joanna Lumley. The track, "Running to the Future", was released as a download-only single, and included on the soundtrack album. Brooks' self-penned song "Just An Excuse" has been remixed several times, most notably appearing on the Bonobo album Migration in 2017. She has performed live since 1960; her 2021 tour, delayed from the previous year due to the COVID-19 pandemic in the United Kingdom, was billed as her 60th Year Anniversary Tour.

Brooks has continued to tour, with concerts through 2023 and 2024. On 25 February 2025, to celebrate her 80th birthday, she was the guest at the "Radio 2 Piano Room" where she performed live, alongside the BBC Concert Orchestra, from the BBC Maida Vale Studios. Her set included the Rag'n'Bone Man song "Human".

== Personal life ==
In the early to mid-1970s, Brooks was married to guitarist Pete Gage. On 1 March 1978, she married her sound engineer, Trevor Jordan, who had worked with Diana Ross, Rolling Stones, Luciano Pavarotti, Sarah Vaughan and many others. They live in Devon and have two sons, Jermaine (born 22 December 1979) and Joseph (born 31 December 1986). Between 1981 and 2002, they lived in a mansion in a secluded area of North Devon. However, in 1998, after her accountant informed her that he had not been paying her taxes, Brooks found herself in severe debt and was reduced to living in a caravan. After four years of increasing interest bills and loans, Brooks managed to sell her home (after being threatened with repossession) and cleared all of her debts. In 2000, Brooks' management and tour promotion was taken over by her son, Jermaine, and his wife, Joanna.

== Discography ==
- Rich Man's Woman (1975)
- Two Days Away (1977)
- Shooting Star (1978)
- Live and Learn (1979)
- Pearls (1981)
- Pearls II (1982)
- Minutes (1984)
- Screen Gems (1984)
- No More the Fool (1986)
- Bookbinder's Kid (1988)
- Inspiration (1989)
- Pearls III (1991)
- Round Midnight (1993)
- Nothin' but the Blues (1994)
- Circles (1995)
- Amazing (1996)
- Shangri-La (2003)
- Trouble in Mind [with Humphrey Lyttelton] (2003)
- Electric Lady (2005)
- Powerless (2009)

== Awards ==
The Ivors Academy Formerly British Academy of Songwriters, Composers and Authors BASCA.

Year	Work	Category	Result
1999	Herself	Gold Badge Award of Merit	Won

Songfestival van Knokke / European Song Cup

(Music contest in the Belgium, 1959-1973).

Year	Award	Category	Result
1964	International Press Award	Best Performance	Won

Capital Radio Music Awards 1979

Year	Category	Result
1979	Best British Female Singer	Nominated

Melody Maker British Music Magazine.

Year	Category	Result
1972	Face of 1973	Won

Disc Music Poll Awards 1974

Disc was a British music magazine between 1958 and 1975, when it merged with Record Mirror.

Year	Category	Result
1973	Top Female Singer (Britain)	8th place

Ny Musik Svensk Musiktidning

(Music magazine that circulated in Sweden, Norway, Denmark and Finland).

Year	Award	Category	Result
1974	Guldörat (Swedish Golden Ear Award)	Best Female Singer International.	Won

The British Rock & Pop Awards

Organised jointly by the Daily Mirror, (Associated Television 1976/77), BBC Radio 1 and BBC TV's Nationwide (TV programme) 1978/84.

Year	Category	Result
1977	Best British Female Singer	Won
1979	Best British Female Singer	Nominated

Guinness Book of British Hit Albums

Year	Category	Award	Result
1998	Most Charted Female Artist Albums	Most UK hit albums by a female artist 1977-1997	Won

Record Mirror Year End Charts

Year	Category	Work	Result
1977	Albums of the Year	Two Days Aways	74th place
1977	Singles of the Year	Sunshine After the Rain	98th place
1981	Albums of the Year	Pearls	34th place
1982	Albums of the Year	Pearls	11th place
1982	Albums of the Year	Pearls II	75th place
1987	Singles of the Year	No More the Fool	100th place
1988	1987 Chart Survey	Top Singles Artists	92nd place
1988	1987 Chart Survey	Top Albums Artists	57th place

Music Week Awards - Chart Performance Survey

Year	Category	Format	Result
1977	Top Female Artist	Singles	5th place
1977	Top Female Artist	Albums	4th place
1978	Top Female Artist	Singles	5th place
1978	Top Female Artist	Albums	8th place
1978	Design Awards (Black and White)	Album Advertisements	2nd place
1978	Radio Comercial	Advertising (Don't Cry Out Loud)	2nd place
1983	Music Video	Album (Pearls II)	77th place

British Phonographic Industry certifications:

Year	Work	Award - Format	Result
1978	Two Days Away	Silver - Album	Certified
1978	Two Days Away	Gold - Album	Certified
1978	Shooting Star	Silver - Album	Certified
1981	Pearls	Silver - Album	Certified
1981	Pearls	Gold - Album	Certified
1981	Pearls	Platinum - Album	Certified
1982	Pearls II	Silver - Album	Certified
1982	Pearls II	Gold - Album	Certified
1982	Pearls II	Platinum Album	Certified
1984	Screen Gems	Silver - Album	Certified
1984	screen Gems	Gold - Album	Certified
1987	No More the Fool	Silver - Album	Certified
1987	No More the Fool	Gold - Album	Certified
1998	The Very Best of Elkie Brooks	Silver - Album	Certified
1998	The Very Best of Elkie Brooks	Gold - Album	Certified
2013	The Best of Elkie Brooks	Gold - Album	Certified
