= 1950s =

Decade of the Gregorian calendar (1950–1959)

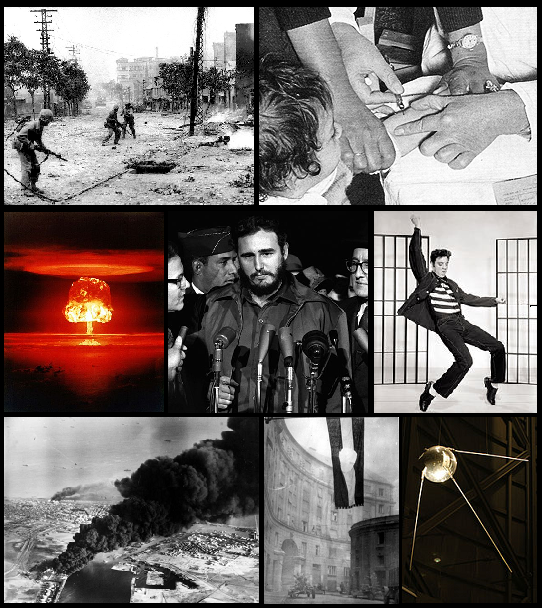
From left to right, top to bottom: U.S. Marines engaged in street fighting during the Korean War, c. late September 1950; The first polio vaccine is developed by Jonas Salk; US tests its first thermonuclear bomb with code name Ivy Mike in 1952. A 1954 thermonuclear test, code named Castle Romeo; In 1959, Fidel Castro overthrows Fulgencio Batista in the Cuban Revolution, which results in the creation of the first and only communist government in the Western Hemisphere; Elvis Presley becomes the leading figure of the newly popular music genre of rock and roll in the mid-1950s; Smoke rises from oil tanks on Port Said following the invasion of Egypt by Israel, United Kingdom and France as part of the Suez Crisis in late 1956; The Hungarian Revolution of 1956; The Soviet Union launches Sputnik 1, the first artificial satellite to orbit the Earth, in October 1957. This starts the Space Race between the Soviet Union and the United States.

The 1950s (pronounced nineteen-fifties; commonly abbreviated as the "Fifties" or the "'50s", among other variants) was a decade that began on 1 January 1950, and ended on 31 December 1959.

Throughout the decade, the world continued its recovery from World War II, aided by the post-World War II economic expansion. The period also saw great population growth with increased birth rates and the emergence of the baby boomer generation. Despite this recovery, the Cold War developed from its modest beginnings in the late 1940s to a heated competition between the Soviet Union and the United States by the early 1960s. The ideological clash between communism and capitalism dominated the decade, especially in the Northern Hemisphere.

In the United States, a wave of anti-communist sentiment known as the Second Red Scare or McCarthyism resulted in Congressional hearings by both houses in Congress. In the Soviet Union, the death of Joseph Stalin would lead to a political campaign and reforms known as "de-Stalinization" initiated by Nikita Khrushchev, eventually leading to the deterioration between the relationship of the Soviet Union and China in the 1950s.

The beginning of the Cold War led to the beginning of the Space Race with the launch of Sputnik 1 in 1957; the United States would create NASA in response in 1958. Along with increased testing of nuclear weapons (such as RDS-37 and Upshot–Knothole) called the arms race, the tense geopolitical situation created a politically conservative climate.

The beginning of decolonization in Africa and Asia also took place in this decade and accelerated in the following one, leading to several wars and conflicts throughout the decade.

Other wars that occurred throughout the 1950s include the First Indochina War (1946–1954), Malayan Emergency (1948–1960), Korean War (1950–1953), the Algerian War (1954–1962), the First Sudanese Civil War (1955–1972), the Vietnam War (1955–1975), the Cuban Revolution (1953–1959), and the Suez Crisis (1956). Coups include the Egyptian Revolution (1952), the Iranian coup d'état (1953), the Guatemalan coup d'état (1954), the 14 July Revolution (1958), and the Pakistani coup d'état (1958).

Television became a common innovation in American homes during the 1950s culminating in the Golden Age of TV. This led many to purchase more products and upgrade whatever they currently had resulting in mass consumerism. While outside of America and a few other western countries, it would take a few decades for TV to become commonplace in other countries.

The 1950s saw a turning point for polio with the successful discovery of the polio vaccine. Following the widespread use of poliovirus vaccine in the mid-1950s, the incidence of poliomyelitis declined rapidly in many industrialized countries while it would gradually decline for the next few decades in developing countries reducing the number of death rates from this disease.

During the 1950s, the world population increased from 2.5 to 3.0 billion, with approximately 1 billion births and 500 million deaths.

== Politics and wars ==
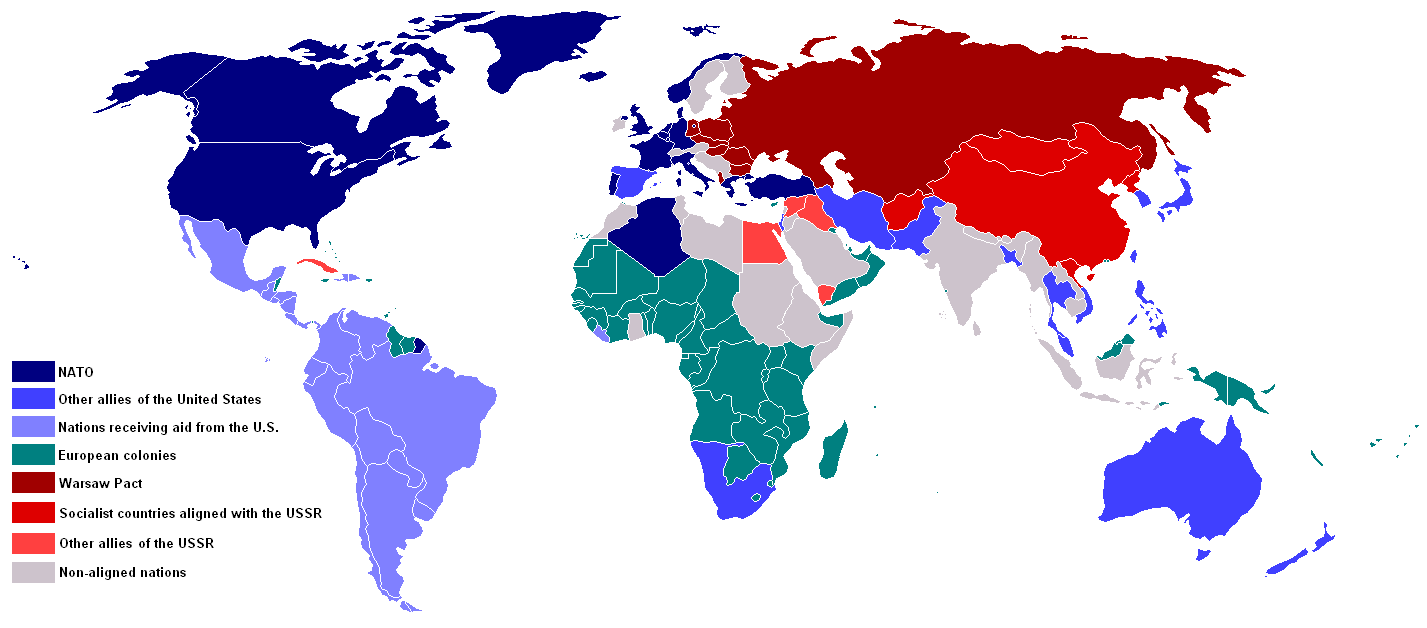
The world map of military alliances during the Cold War in 1959

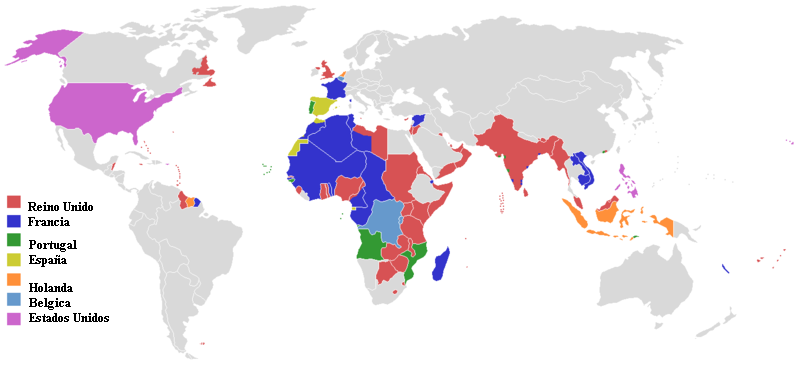
Colonial powers in 1945

=== Wars ===
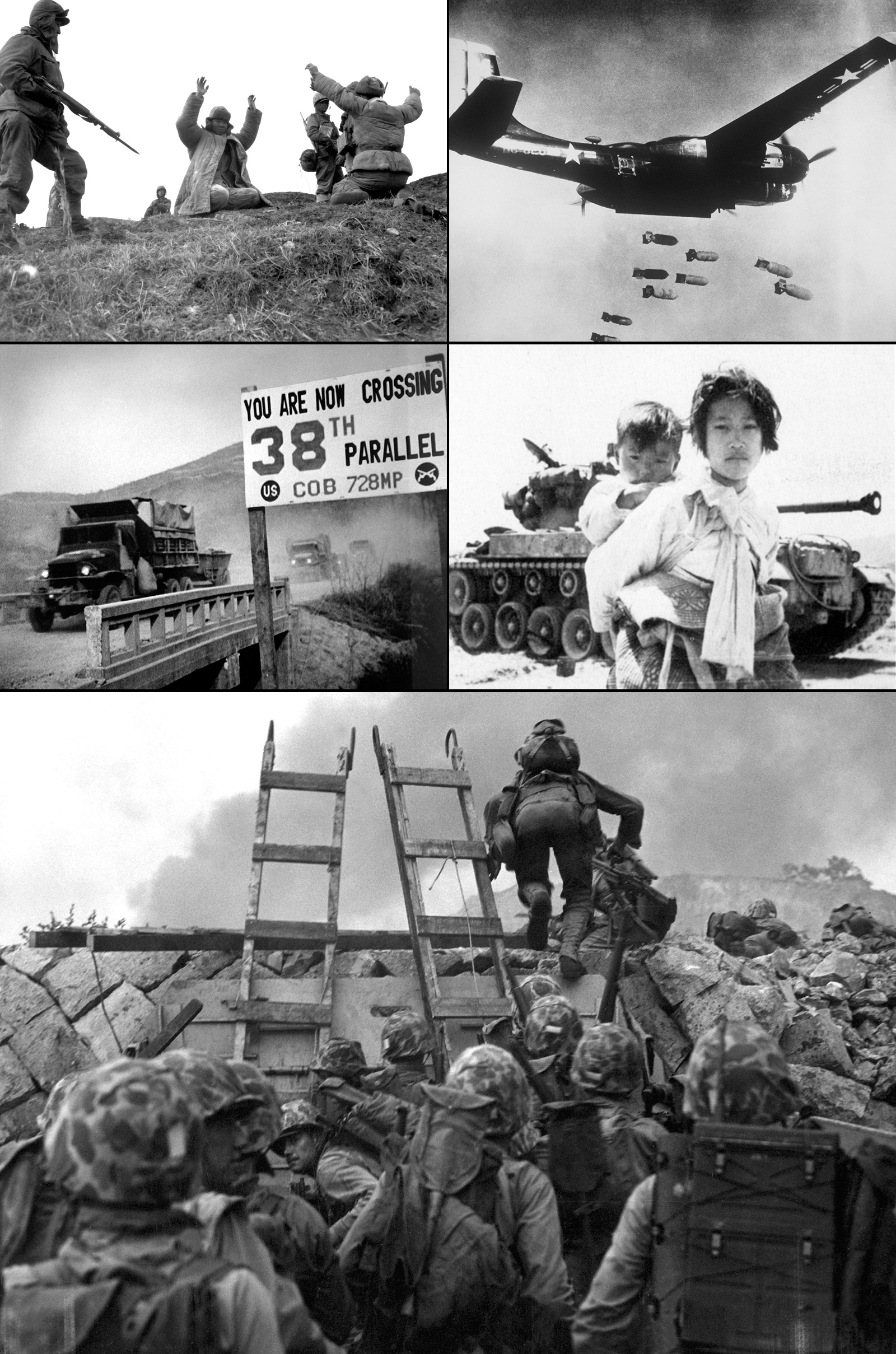
Korean War

- Cold War conflicts involving the influence of the rival superpowers of the Soviet Union and the United States.
  - Korean War (1950–1953) – The war, which lasted from June 25, 1950, until the signing of the Korean Armistice Agreement on July 27, 1953, started as a civil war between North Korea and the Republic of Korea (South Korea). When it began, North and South Korea existed as provisional governments competing for control over the Korean peninsula, due to the division of Korea by outside powers. While originally a civil war, it quickly escalated into a war between the Western powers under the United Nations Command led by the United States and its allies and the communist powers of the People's Republic of China and the Soviet Union.
    On September 15, General Douglas MacArthur conducted Operation Chromite, an amphibious landing at the city of Inchon (Song Do port). The North Korean army collapsed, and within a few days, MacArthur's army retook Seoul (South Korea's capital). He then pushed north, capturing Pyongyang in October. Chinese intervention the following month drove UN forces south again. MacArthur then planned for a full-scale invasion of China, but this was against the wishes of President Truman and others who wanted a limited war. He was dismissed and replaced by General Matthew Ridgway. The war then became a bloody stalemate for the next two and a half years while peace negotiations dragged on.
    The war left 33,742 American soldiers dead, 92,134 wounded, and 80,000 missing in action (MIA) or prisoner of war (POW). Estimates place Korean and Chinese casualties at 1,000,000–1,400,000 dead or wounded, and 140,000 MIA or POW.
  - First Indochina War (1946–1954).
  - The Vietnam War began in 1955. Diệm instituted a policy of death penalty against any communist activity in 1956. The Viet Minh began an assassination campaign in early 1957. An article by French scholar Bernard Fall published in July 1958 concluded that a new war had begun. The first official large unit military action was on September 26, 1959, when the Viet Cong ambushed two ARVN companies.
- Arab–Israeli conflict (from the early 20th century)

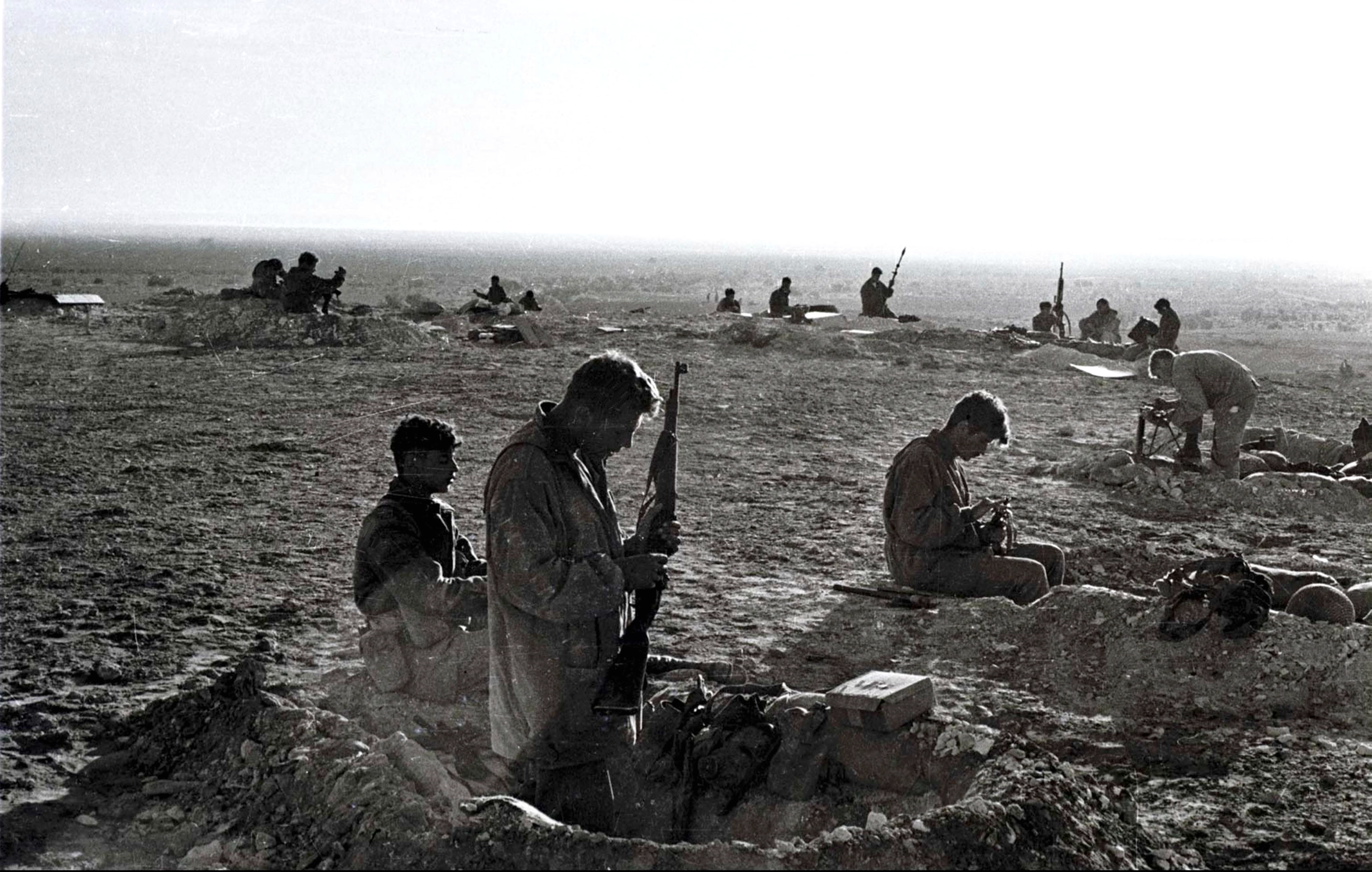
Israeli troops preparing for combat in the Sinai peninsula during the Suez Crisis.

- Suez Crisis (1956) – The Suez Crisis was a war fought on Egyptian territory in 1956. Following the nationalisation of the Suez Canal in 1956 by Gamal Abdel Nasser, the United Kingdom, France and Israel subsequently invaded. The operation was a military success, but after the United States and Soviet Union united in opposition to the invasion, the invaders were forced to withdraw. This was seen as a major humiliation, especially for the two Western European countries, and symbolizes the beginning of the end of colonialism and the weakening of European global importance, specifically the collapse of the British Empire.
- Algerian War (1954–1962) – An important decolonization war, it was a complex conflict characterized by guerrilla warfare, maquis fighting, terrorism against civilians, use of torture on both sides and counter-terrorism operations by the French Army. The war eventually led to the independence of Algeria from France.

=== Internal conflicts ===
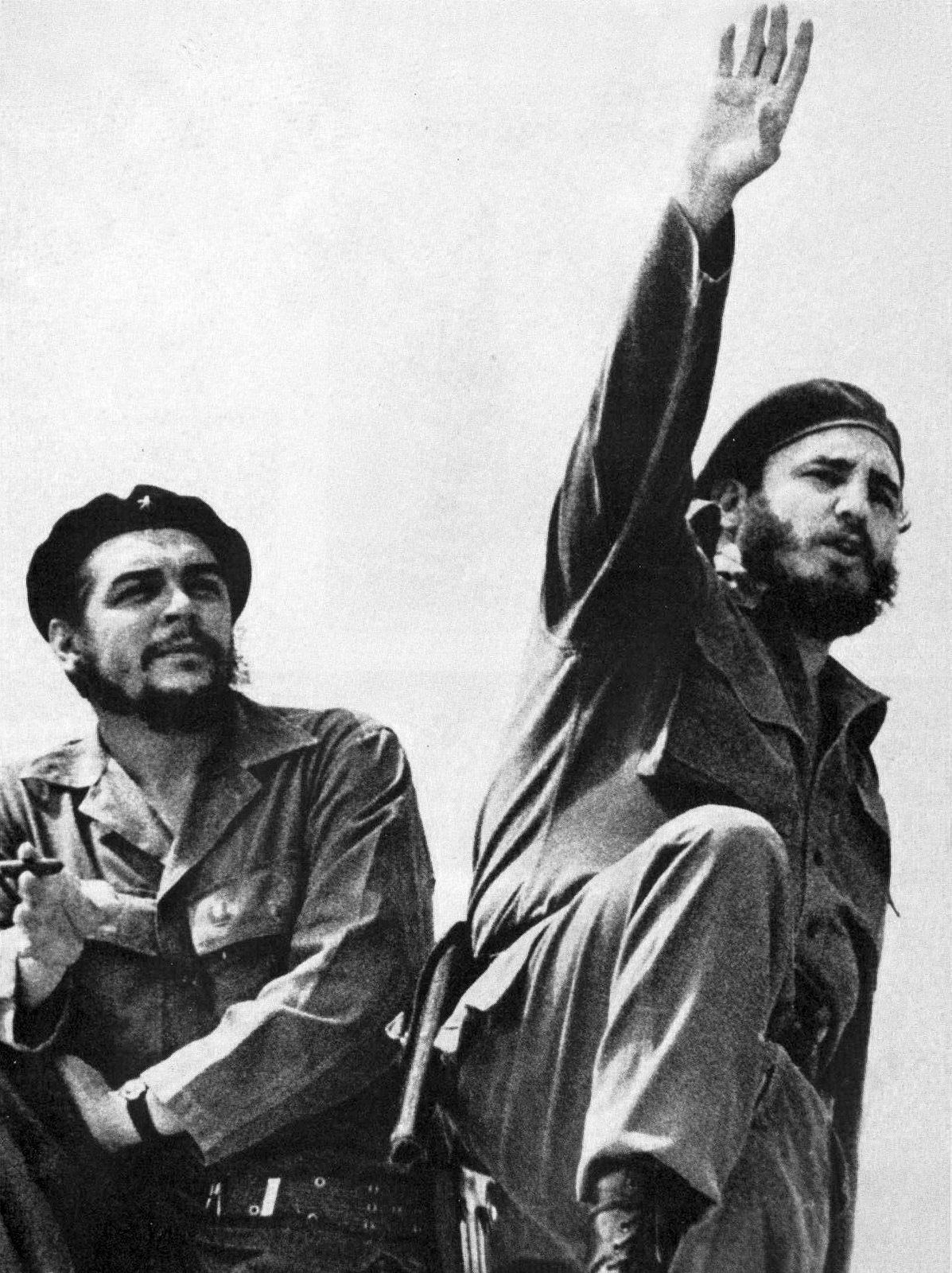
Che Guevara and Fidel Castro. Castro becomes the leader of Cuba as a result of the Cuban Revolution

- Malayan Emergency (1948–1960) – a guerrilla war in British Malaya that led to the independence of the Federation of Malaya.
- Cuban Revolution (1953–1959) – The 1959 overthrow of Fulgencio Batista by Fidel Castro, Che Guevara, and other forces resulted in the creation of the first communist government in the Western hemisphere.
- The Mau Mau began retaliating against the British in Kenya. This led to concentration camps in Kenya, a British military victory, and the election of moderate nationalist Jomo Kenyatta as leader of Kenya.
- First Sudanese Civil War (1955–1972)
- The Wind of Destruction began in Rwanda in 1959 following the assault of Hutu politician Dominique Mbonyumutwa by Tutsi forces. This was the beginning of decades of ethnic violence in the country, which culminated in the 1994 Rwandan genocide.
- Hungarian Revolution of 1956 – A massive, spontaneous popular uprising in the Soviet satellite state of Hungary against that country's Soviet-backed Marxist-Leninist regime, inspired by political changes in Poland and the Soviet Union. The uprising, fought primarily by students and workers, managed to fight the invading Soviet Army to a standstill, and a new, pro-reform government took power. While the top Soviet leaders even considered withdrawing from Hungary entirely, they soon crushed the Revolution with a massive second invasion, killing thousands of Hungarians and sending hundreds of thousands more into exile. This was the largest act of internal dissent in the history of the Soviet Bloc, and its violent suppression served to further discredit the Soviet Union even among its erstwhile supporters.
- 1951 Nepalese revolution – The overthrow of the autocratic Rana regime in Nepal and the establishment of democracy in Nepal.

=== Coups ===
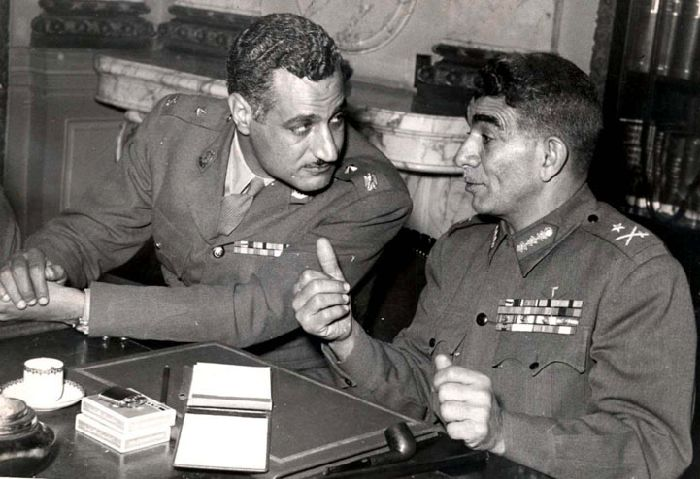
Gamal Abdel Nasser and Mohammed Naguib, leaders of the 1952 Egyptian revolution

Prominent coups d'état of the decade included:

- 1952 Egyptian revolution: A group of army officers led by Mohammed Naguib and Gamal Abdel Nasser overthrew King Farouk and the Muhammad Ali Dynasty in July 1952.
- On March 10, 1952, Fulgencio Batista led a bloodless coup to topple the democratically elected government in Cuba.
- 1953 Iranian coup d'état: In August 1953, a coup jointly led by the United States and United Kingdom and codenamed Operation Ajax, overthrew Prime Minister Mohammed Mosaddeq.
- 1953 Pakistani constitutional coup: Governor-General Ghulam Mohammad, supported by Field Marshal Ayub Khan, dismissed the prime minister and dissolved the Constituent Assembly.
- 1954 Guatemalan coup d'état: The democratically elected government of Colonel Jacobo Arbenz Guzmán was ousted by Colonel Carlos Castillo Armas in an operation organized by the American Central Intelligence Agency.
- The 1954 Paraguayan coup brings Alfredo Stroessner to power.
- 14 July Revolution in Iraq: The Hashemite monarchy was overthrown and the Iraqi Republic was established, with Abd al-Karim Qasim as Prime Minister.
- May 1958 crisis in France: General Jacques Massu took over Algiers and threatened to invade Paris unless Charles de Gaulle became head of state.
- The 1958 Pakistani coup d'état: The first President of Pakistan Iskander Mirza abrogated the Constitution of Pakistan and declared martial law, and lasted until October 27, when Mirza himself was deposed by General Ayub Khan.

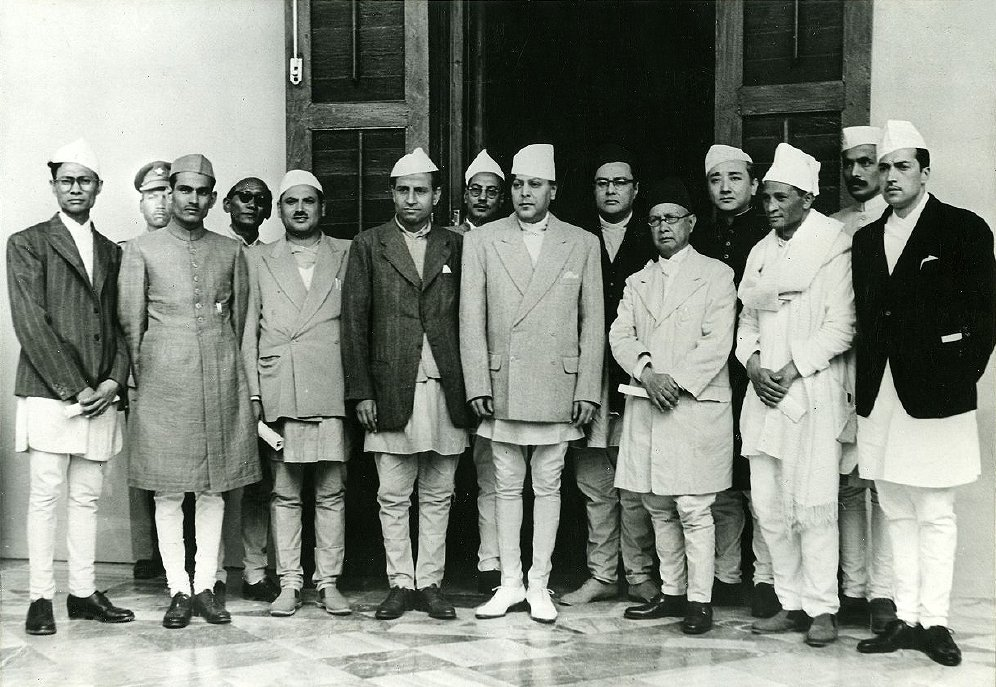
Leading figures of the Nepali Congress and King Tribhuvan

=== Decolonization and independence ===
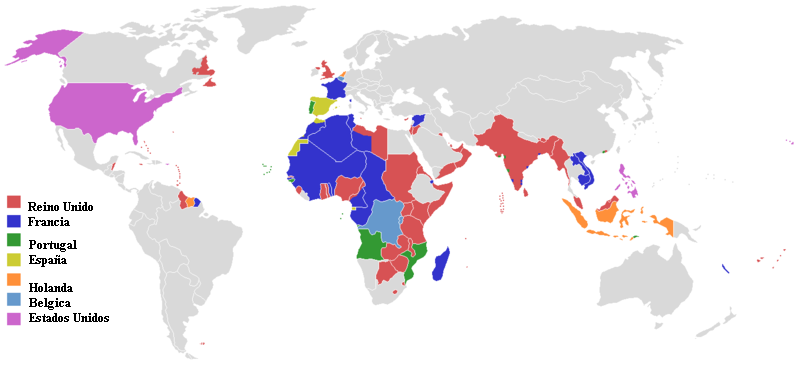
Colonial powers in 1945

- Decolonization of former European colonial empires. The French Fourth Republic in particular faced conflict on two fronts within the French Union, the Algerian War and the First Indochina War. The Federation of Malaya peacefully gained independence from the United Kingdom in 1957. French rule ended in Algeria in 1958, Vietnam left French Indochina in 1954. The rival states of North Vietnam and South Vietnam were formed. Cambodia and the Kingdom of Laos also gained independence, effectively ending French presence in Southeast Asia. Elsewhere, the Belgian Congo and other African nations gained their independence from France, Belgium, and the United Kingdom.
- Large-scale decolonization in Africa first began in the 1950s. In 1951, Libya became the first African country to gain independence from the United Kingdom and France in the decade, and in 1954 the Algerian War began. 1956 saw Sudan become independent from Britain and Morocco, and Tunisia become independent from France, and the next year Ghana became the first sub-saharan African nation to gain independence.

=== Prominent political events ===
- European Common Market – The European Communities (or Common Markets), the precursor of the European Union, was established with the Treaty of Rome in 1957.
- On November 1, 1950, two Puerto Rican nationalists staged an attempted assassination on U.S. President Harry S. Truman. The leader of the team Griselio Torresola had firearm experience and Oscar Collazo was his accomplice. They made their assault at the Blair House where President Truman and his family were staying. Torresola mortally wounded a White House policeman, Leslie Coffelt, who shot Torresola dead before expiring himself. Collazo, as a co-conspirator in a felony that turned into a homicide, was found guilty of murder and was sentenced to death in 1952 but then his sentence was later commuted to life in prison.
- On July 7, 1950, the first Group Areas Act was promulgated by the Parliament of South Africa and implemented over a period of several years. The passing of the Act contributed significantly to the period of institutionalised racial segregation and discrimination in South Africa known as Apartheid, which lasted from 1948 to 1991. One of the most famous uses of the Group Areas Act was the destruction of Sophiatown, a suburb of Johannesburg, which began on 9 February 1955.
- Establishment of the Non-Aligned Movement, through the Bandung Conference of 1955, consisting of nations not formally aligned with or against any major power bloc.

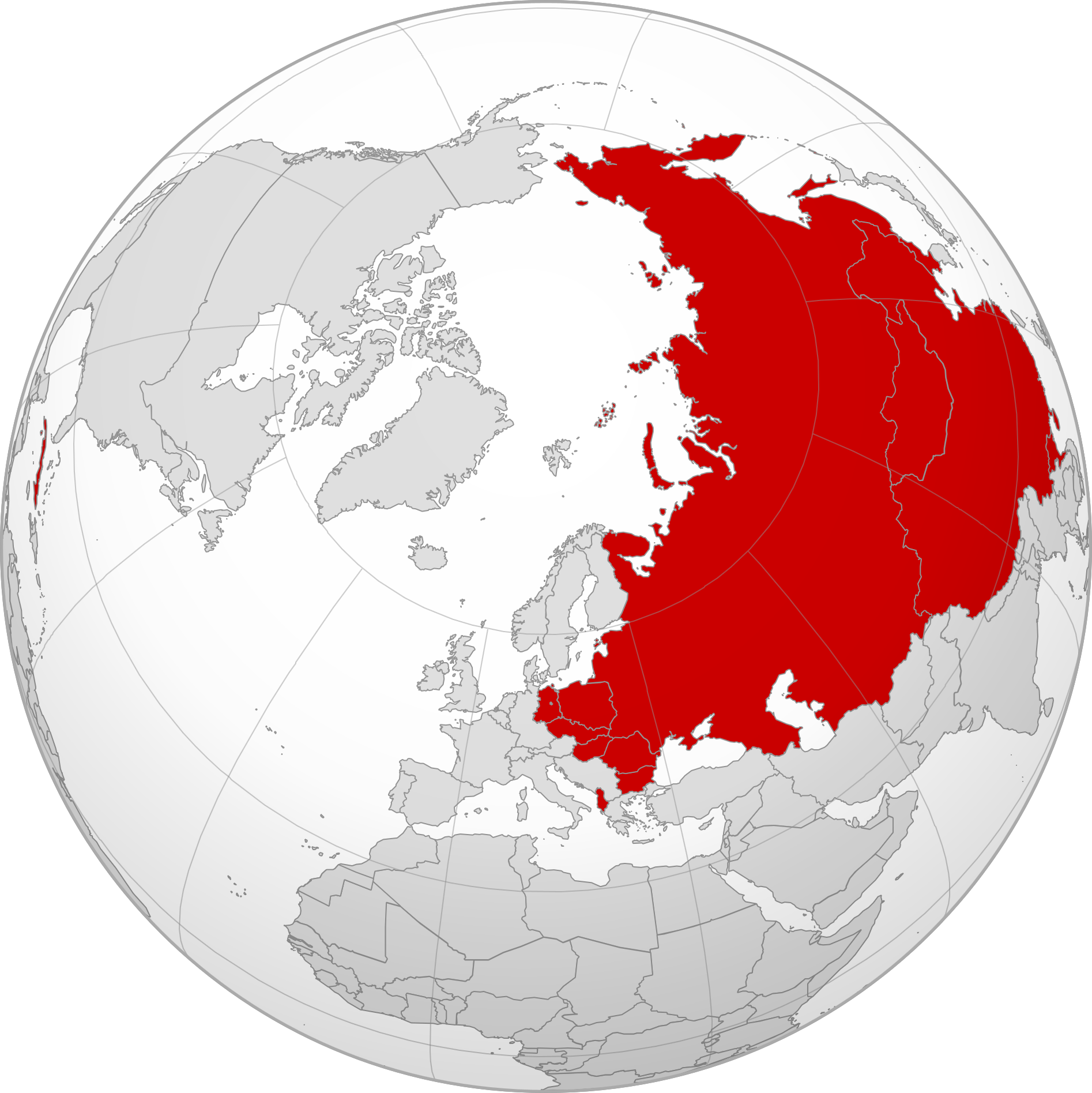
The maximum territorial extent of countries in the world under Soviet influence, after the Cuban Revolution.

==== Asia ====
- The U.S. ended its occupation of Japan, which became fully independent. Japan held democratic elections and recovered economically.
- Within a year of its establishment, the People's Republic of China had reclaimed Tibet and intervened in the Korean War, causing years of hostility and estrangement from the United States. Mao admired Stalin and rejected the changes in Moscow after Stalin's death in 1953, leading to growing tension with the Soviet Union.
- In 1950–1953, France tried to contain a growing communist insurgency led by Ho Chi Minh. After their defeat in the Battle of Dien Bien Phu in 1954 France granted independence to the nations of Cambodia, Laos, and Vietnam. At the Geneva Conference of 1954 France and the Communists agreed to divide Vietnam and hold elections in 1956. The U.S. and South Vietnam rejected the Geneva accords and the division became permanent.
- The Chinese Civil War, which had started officially in 1927 and continued until the Second World War had ended on May 7, 1950. It resulted in the previous incumbent government in China, the Republic of China, retreating to the islands of Taiwan and Hainan until the Landing Operation on Hainan Island.

==== Africa ====
- Africa experienced the beginning of large-scale top-down economic interventions in the 1950s that failed to cause improvement and led to charitable exhaustion by the West as the century went on. The widespread corruption was not dealt with and war, disease, and famine continued to be constant problems in the region.
- Egyptian general Gamel Abdel Nasser overthrew the Egyptian monarchy, establishing himself as President of Egypt. Nasser became an influential leader in the Middle East in the 1950s, leading Arab states into war with Israel, becoming a major leader of the Non-Aligned Movement and promoting pan-Arab unification.
- In 1957, Dr. Kwame Nkrumah, after a series of negotiations with the then British empire, secured the independence of Ghana. Ghana was hitherto referred to as Gold Coast, a colony of the British Empire.

==== Americas ====
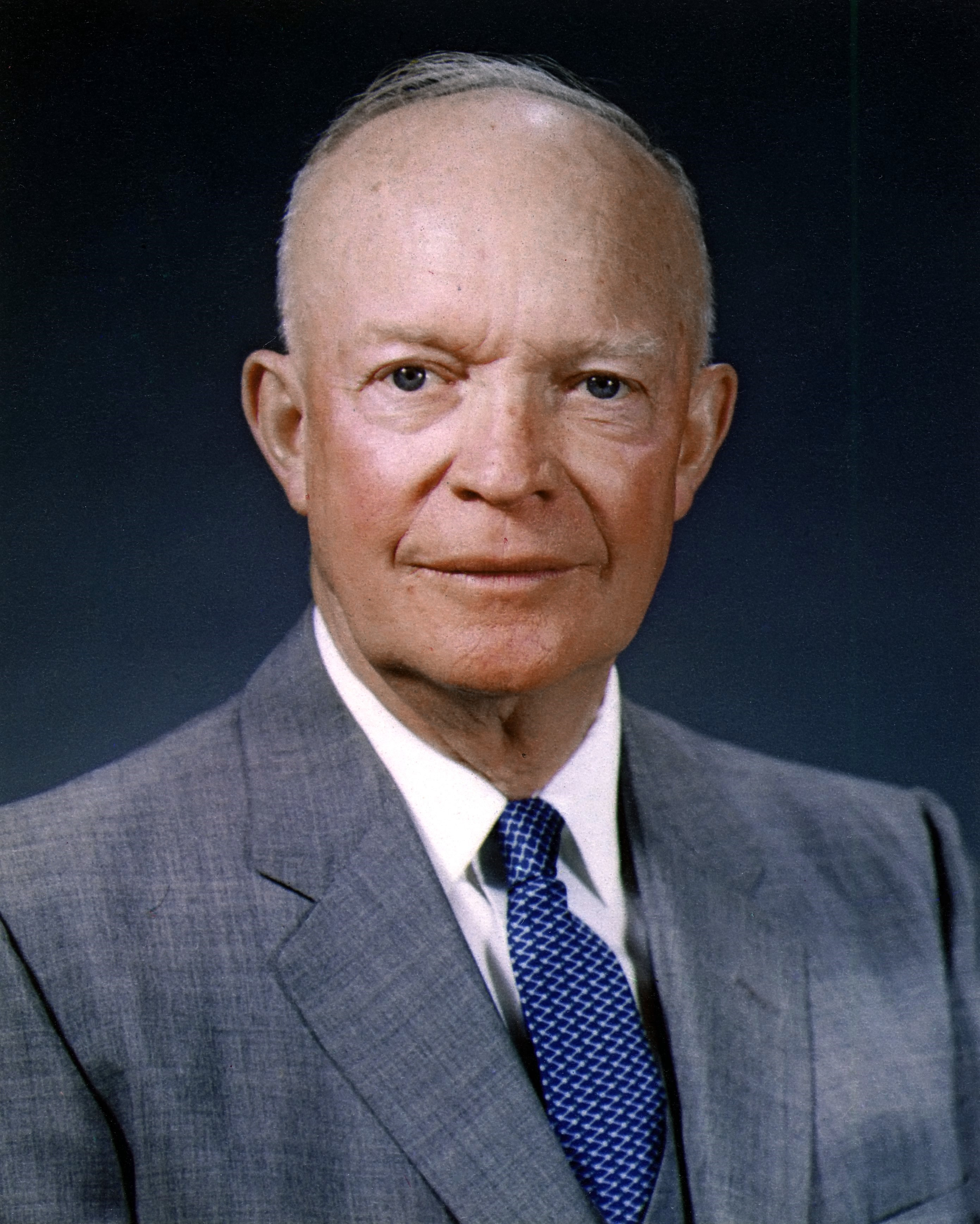
Official portrait of Dwight D. Eisenhower, president of the United States for a majority of the 1950s

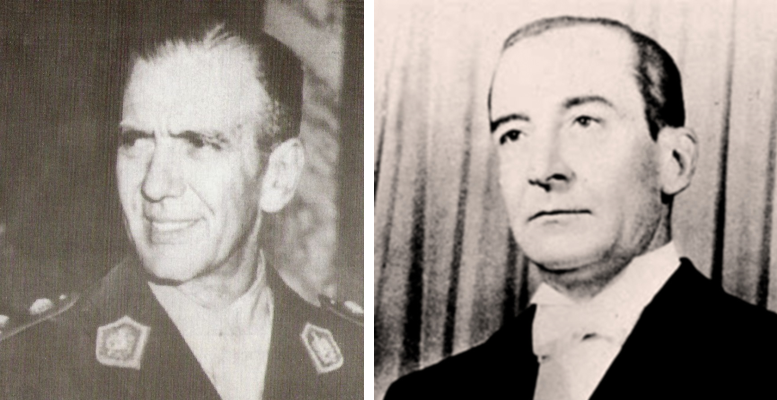
Presidents Eduardo Lonardi and Pedro Aramburu, the first and second leader of the "Revolución Libertadora" dictatorship in Argentina.

- In 1950, Greenland (27 May) became a Colony of the Kingdom of Denmark. North Greenland and South Greenland were united with one governor.
- In 1953, Greenland (5 June) was made an equal and integral part of Denmark as an amt.
- In 1954, the CIA orchestrated the overthrow of the Guatemalan government of Jacobo Arbenz and installed Carlos Castillo Armas.
- In 1955, Juan Perón's government is overthrown by military officers in the self-proclaimed Revolución Libertadora in Argentina.
- In 1956, the Montgomery bus boycott occurred against the policy of racial segregation on the public transit system of Montgomery, Alabama, US. It was a foundational event in the civil rights movement, sparked by activist Rosa Parks, and officially ended when the federal ruling Browder v. Gayle took effect and led to a Supreme Court decision that declared the Alabama laws that segregated buses were unconstitutional.
- In 1957, Dr. François Duvalier came to power in an election in Haiti. He later declared himself president for life, and ruled until his death in 1971.
- In 1958, the military dictatorship of Venezuela was overthrown.
- In 1959, Alaska (3 January) and Hawaii (21 August) became the 49th and 50th states respectively of the United States.
- In 1959, Fidel Castro overthrew the regime of Fulgencio Batista in Cuba, establishing a communist government in the country. Although Castro initially sought aid from the US, he was rebuffed and later turned to the Soviet Union.
- NORAD signed in 1959 by Canada and the United States creating a unified North American air defense system.
- Brasília was built in 41 months, from 1956, and on April 21, 1960, became the capital of Brazil

==== Europe ====
- With the help of the Marshall Plan, post-war reconstruction succeeded, with some countries (including West Germany) adopting free market capitalism while others adopted Keynesian-policy welfare states. Europe continued to be divided into Western and Soviet bloc countries. The geographical point of this division came to be called the Iron Curtain.
- Because previous attempts for a unified state failed, Germany remained divided into two states: the capitalist Federal Republic of Germany in the west and the socialist German Democratic Republic in the east. The Federal Republic identified itself as the legal successor to the fascist dictatorship and was obliged in paying war reparations. The GDR, however, denounced the fascist past completely and did not recognize itself as responsible for paying reparations on behalf of the Nazi regime. The GDR's more harsh attitude in suppressing anti-communist and Russophobic sentiment lingering in the post-Nazi society resulted in increased emigration to the west.
- While the United States military maintained its bases in western Europe, the Soviet Union maintained its bases in the east. In 1953, Joseph Stalin, the leader of the Soviet Union, died. This led to the rise of Nikita Khrushchev, who denounced Stalin and pursued a more liberal domestic and foreign policy, stressing peaceful competition with the West rather than overt hostility. There were anti-Stalinist uprisings in East Germany and Poland in 1953 and Hungary in 1956.
- The Coronation of Elizabeth II took place on June 2, 1953, months after the death of her father King George VI. Elizabeth II was crowned Queen of the United Kingdom and other Commonwealth realms at Westminster Abbey in London in a first ever televised broadcast.

== Disasters ==
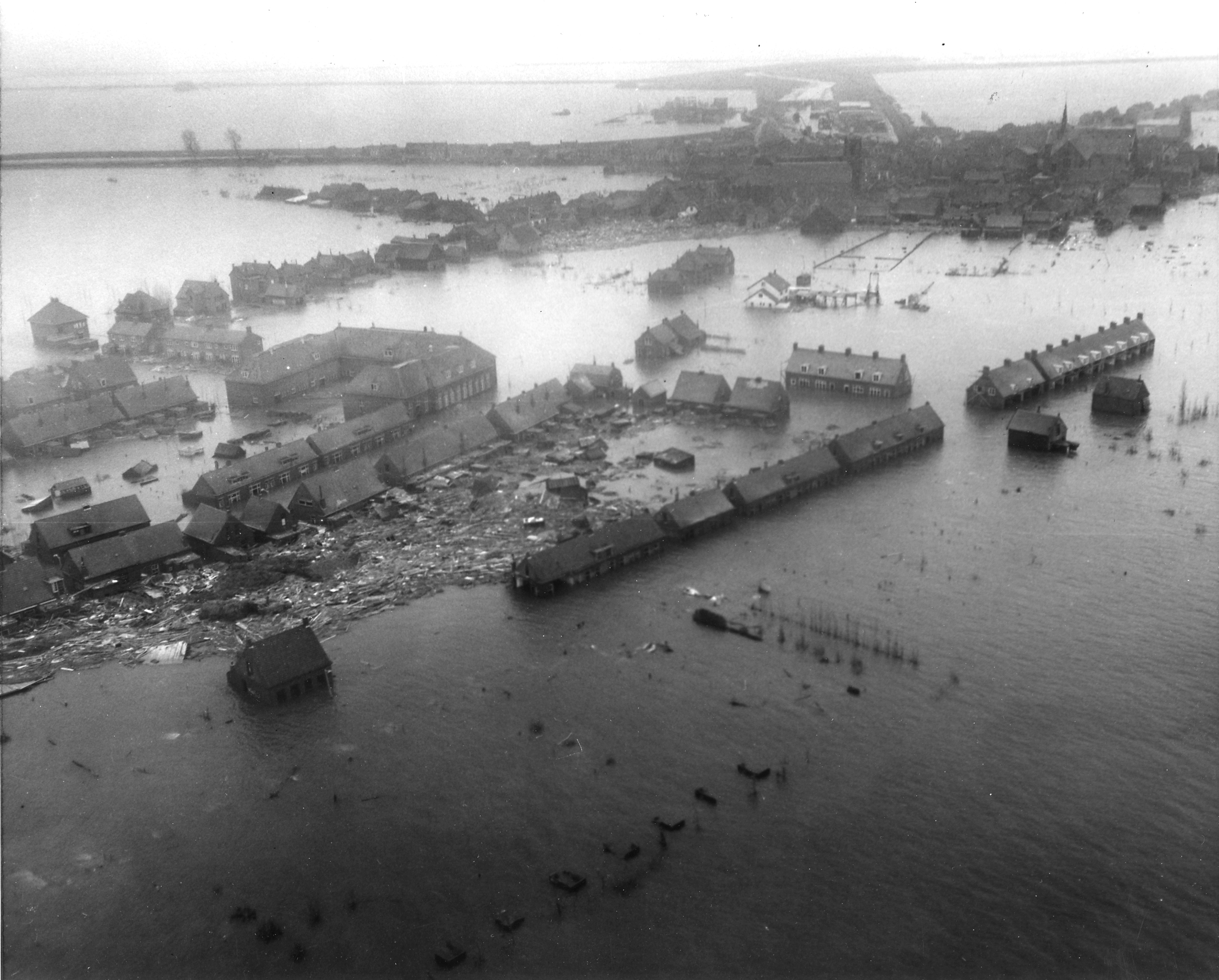
North Sea flood of 1953

Natural:

- On August 15, 1950, the 8.6 M_{w} Assam–Tibet earthquake shakes the region with a maximum Mercalli intensity of XI (Extreme), killing between 1,500 and 3,300 people.
- On January 18, 1951, Mount Lamington erupted in Papua New Guinea, killing 3,000 people.
- On January 31, 1953, the North Sea flood of 1953 killed 1,835 people in the southwestern Netherlands (especially Zeeland) and 307 in the United Kingdom
- On September 9, 1954, the 6.7 M_{w} Chlef earthquake shakes northern Algeria with a maximum Mercalli intensity of XI (Extreme). The shock destroyed Orléansville, left 1,243–1,409 dead, and 5,000 injured.
- On October 11, 1954, Hurricane Hazel crossed over Haiti, killing 1,000.
- On August 19, 1955, Hurricane Diane hit the northeastern United States, killing over 200 people, and causing over $1.0 billion in damage.
- On June 27, 1957, Hurricane Audrey demolished Cameron, Louisiana, US, killing 400 people.
- In April 1959, the Río Negro flooded central Uruguay.
- Typhoon Vera hit central Honshū on September 26, 1959, killing an estimated 5,098, injuring another 38,921, and leaving 1,533,000 homeless. Most of the damage was centered in the Nagoya area.
- On December 2, 1959, Malpasset Dam in southern France collapsed and water flowed over the town of Fréjus, killing 412.

Non-natural:

- On March 12, 1950, an Avro Tudor plane carrying a rugby team crashed in Wales, killing 80 people.
- In early December 1952, the Great Smog of London caused major disruption by reducing visibility and even penetrating indoor areas, far more severely than previous smog events, called "pea-soupers". Government medical reports in the weeks following the event estimated that up to 4,000 people had died as a direct result of the smog and 100,000 more were made ill by the smog's effects on the human respiratory tract.
- On June 18, 1953, a USAF Douglas C-124 Globemaster II crashed after takeoff from Tachikawa, Japan, killing all 129 on board.
- On January 10, 1954, BOAC Flight 781, a new de Havilland Comet jetliner, disintegrated in mid-air due to structural failure and crashed off the Italian coast, killing all 35 on board.
- On June 30, 1956, a United Airlines Douglas DC-7 and a Trans World Airlines Lockheed L-1049 Super Constellation collided above the Grand Canyon in Arizona, killing all 128 people on board both aircraft.
- On July 25, 1956, the Italian ocean liner SS Andrea Doria collided with the Swedish ocean liner MS Stockholm off the Nantucket, Massachusetts, coastline. 51 people were killed and the Andrea Doria sank the next morning.
- On February 6, 1958, in an incident known as the Munich air disaster, British European Airways Flight 609 crashed on its third attempt to take off from a slush-covered runway at Munich-Riem Airport in Munich, West Germany. 23 people on board were killed (including 8 players of the Manchester United F.C. soccer team).
- On April 21, 1958, a mid-air collision between United Airlines Flight 736 and a USAF fighter jet killed 49 people.
- On August 14, 1958, a KLM Lockheed Constellation crashed into the Atlantic Ocean off the coast of Ireland, killing all 99 people aboard.

== Economics ==
- The United States was the most influential economic power in the world after World War II under the presidency of Dwight D. Eisenhower.

In the 1950s, the median age of newlyweds declined to its lowest point, a level not seen since. By 1954, nearly half of American brides were teenagers, often marrying men just a few years older. These brides sought husbands who were stable providers. A strong economy and low unemployment rates supported widespread prosperity, expanding the middle class and making affordable housing accessible. This economic environment enabled young couples to marry early, granting teenage brides notable purchasing power that marketers actively targeted.

During this period, a gap in educational attainment emerged, with college degrees yielding higher earning potential than high school diplomas. Given prevailing cultural norms, more men pursued higher education while their wives contributed financially by entering the workforce. Recognizing this support, some schools even awarded the "PhT" (Putting Husband Through) diploma to acknowledge wives who helped their husbands complete their degrees.

Credit cards gained widespread popularity in the 1950s starting with the Diners Club Card in New York and soon after expanded to multiple countries.

Inflation was moderate during the decade of the 1950s. The first few months had a deflationary hangover from the 1940s but the first full year ended with what looked like the beginnings of massive inflation with annual inflation rates ranging from 8% to 9% a year. By 1952 inflation subsided. 1954 and 1955 flirted with deflation again but the remainder of the decade had moderate inflation ranging from 1% to 3.7%. The average annual inflation for the entire decade was only 2.04%.

== Assassinations and attempts ==
Prominent assassinations, targeted killings, and assassination attempts include:

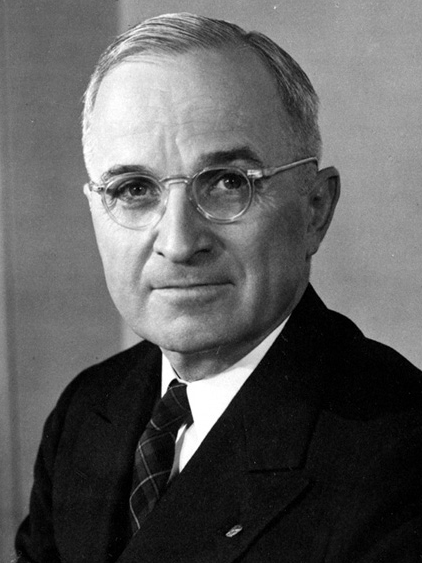
Harry S. Truman

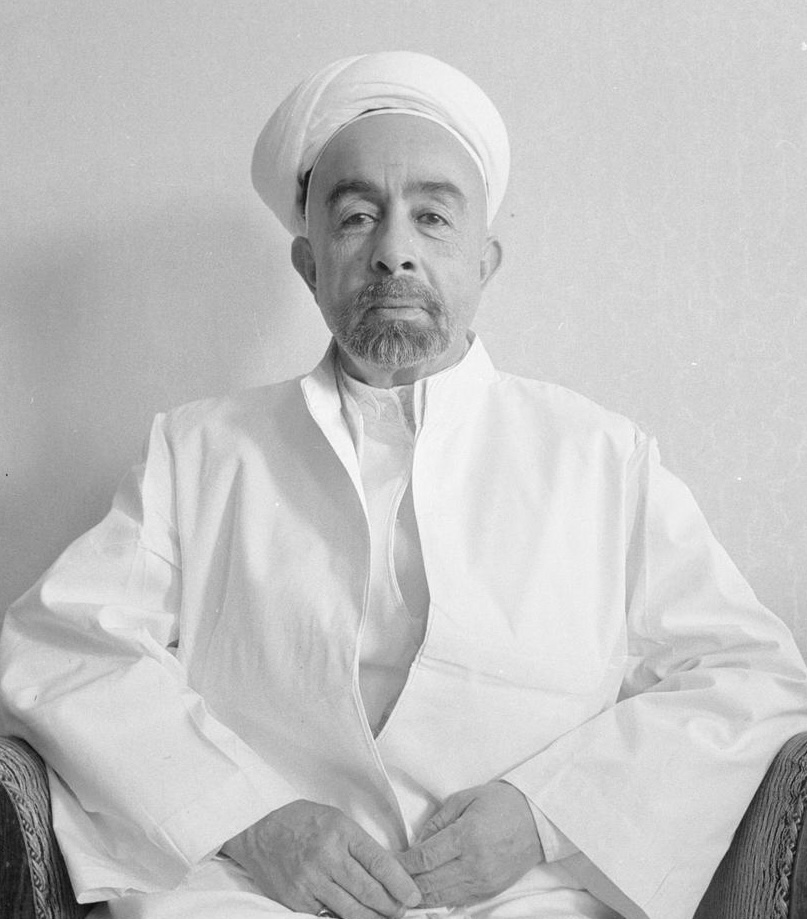
Abdullah I of Jordan

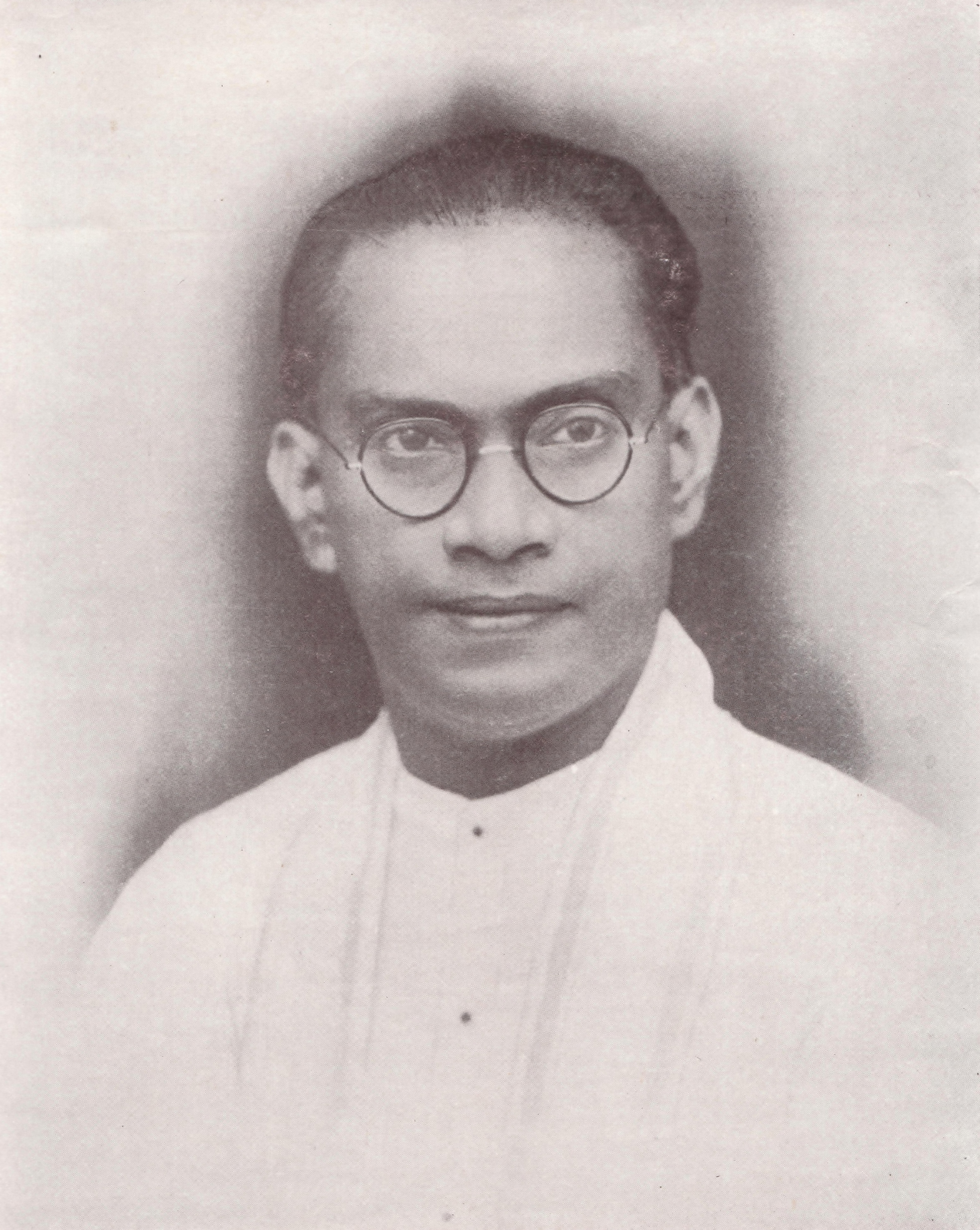
S. W. R. D. Bandaranaike

Date	Description
18 August 1950	Julien Lahaut, Belgian politician and communist activist was president of the Communist Party of Belgium, assassinated in August 1950.
1 November 1950	Harry S. Truman, 33rd President of the United States, survives an assassination attempt when two Puerto Rican independence activists open fire while he is staying at Blair House. One White House Police officer is killed in the ensuing firefight.
3 March 1951	Haj Ali Razmara, a military leader and prime minister of Iran, was assassinated by 26-year-old Khalil Tahmassebi of the Fadayan-e Islam organization outside the Shah Mosque in Tehran.
16 July 1951	Riad Al Solh, former Prime Minister of Lebanon, is shot to death by three gunmen at Marka Airport in Amman.
20 July 1951	Abdullah I of Jordan is assassinated while attending Friday prayers at Al-Aqsa Mosque in Jerusalem.
2 January 1955	José Antonio Remón Cantera, 16th President of Panama, is assassinated in Panama City. His successor, José Ramón Guizado, would be convicted for his involvement in the murder.
3 May 1955	Trình Minh Thế, Vietnamese nationalist and Cao Dai military leader during the end of the First Indochina War and the beginning of the Vietnam War. While standing near his military jeep, Thế was shot in the back of the head by a sniper. The murder was unsolved.
29 September 1956	Anastasio Somoza García, President of Nicaragua, is shot to death in León.
26 July 1957	Carlos Castillo Armas, Guatemalan military officer and politician who was the 28th president of Guatemala, was assassinated dead by a presidential guard with leftist sympathies in the presidential palace in Guatemala City.
13 September 1958	Ruben Um Nyobè, anti-colonialist Cameroonian leader, near his natal village of Boumnyebel, slain by the French army in the department of Nyong-et-Kellé in the maquis Bassa.
25 September 1959	S. W. R. D. Bandaranaike, 4th Prime Minister of Sri Lanka, is shot to death by a disgruntled Buddhist priest at his private residence in Colombo.

== Science and technology ==
=== Technology ===
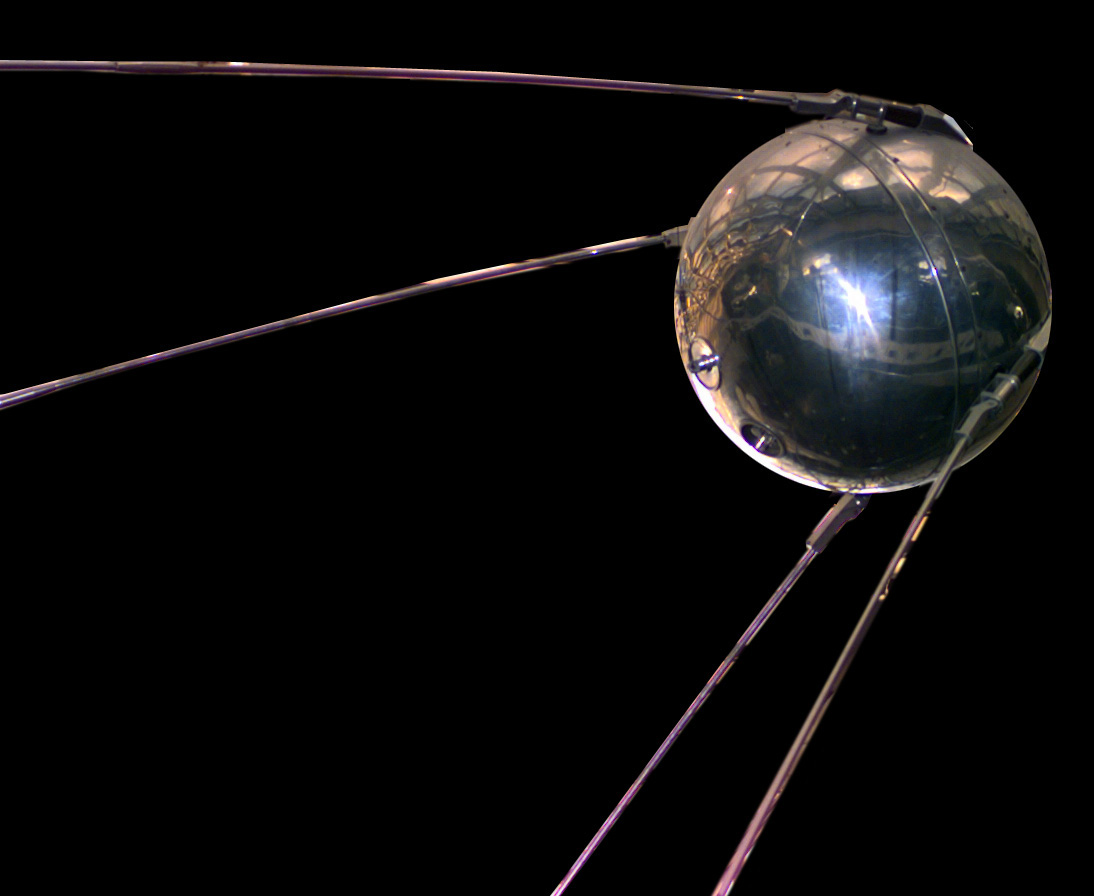
In 1957, the Soviet Union launches to space Sputnik 1, the first artificial satellite

The recently invented bipolar transistor, though initially quite feeble, had clear potential and was rapidly improved and developed at the beginning of the 1950s by companies such as GE, RCA, and Philco. The first commercial transistor production started at the Western Electric plant in Allentown, Pennsylvania, in October, 1951 with the point contact germanium transistor. It was not until around 1954 that transistor products began to achieve real commercial success with small portable radios.

Television, which first reached the marketplace in the 1940s, attained maturity during the 1950s and by the end of the decade, most American households owned a TV set. A rush to produce larger screens than the tiny ones found on 1940s models occurred during 1950–52. In 1954, RCA intro Bell Telephone Labs produced the first Solar battery. In 1954, a yard of contact paper could be purchased for only 59 cents. Polypropylene was invented in 1954. In 1955, Jonas Salk invented a polio vaccine which was given to more than seven million American students. In 1956, a solar powered wrist watch was invented.

In 1957, a 184-pound (83 kg) satellite named Sputnik 1 was launched by the Soviets. The space race began four months later as the United States launched a smaller satellite.

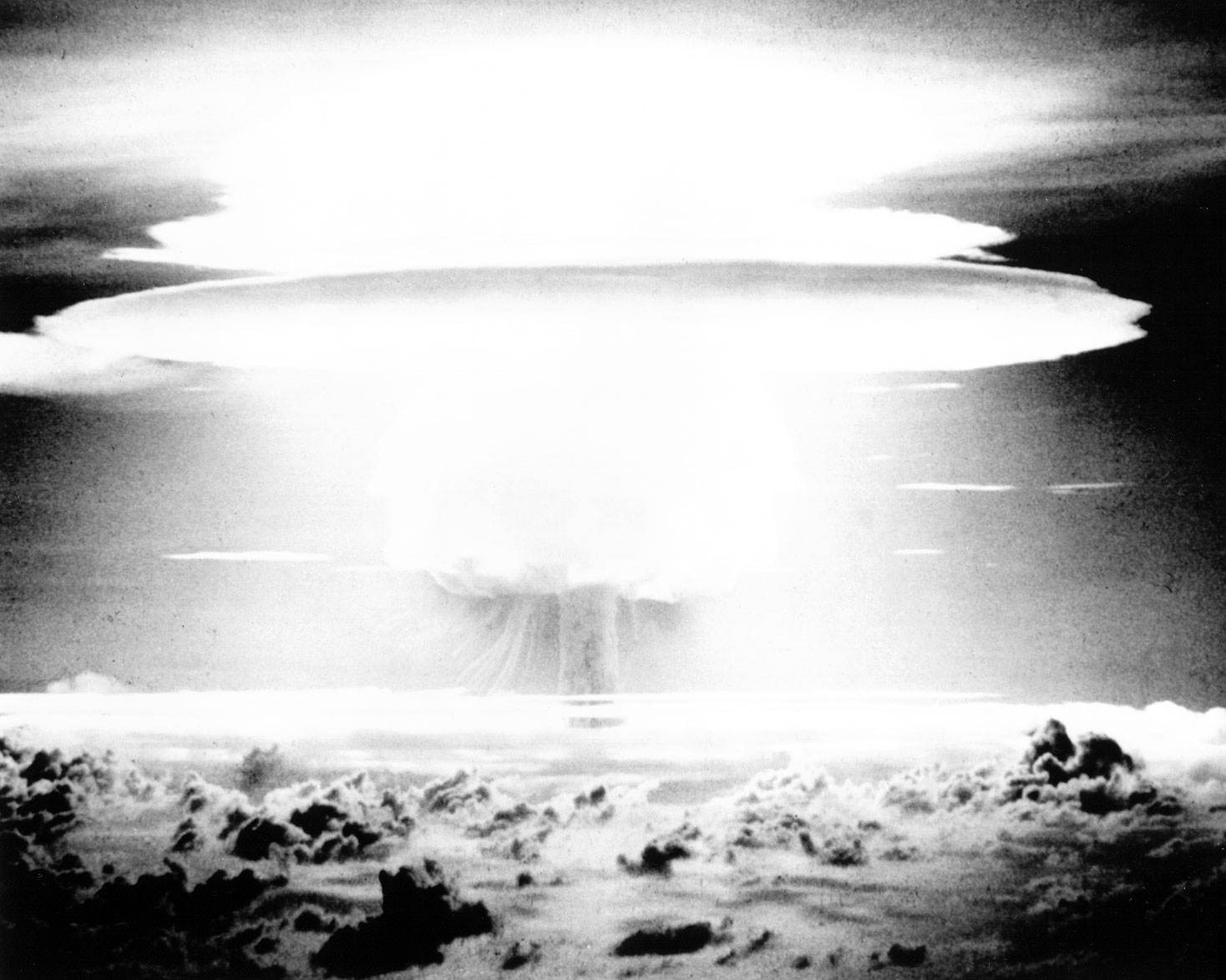
Castle Bravo: A 15 megaton hydrogen bomb experiment conducted by the United States in 1954. Photographed 78 miles (125 kilometers) from the explosion epicenter.

- Charles H. Townes builds the Maser in 1953 at the Columbia University.
- The Soviet Union launches Sputnik 1, the first artificial satellite to orbit the Earth on October 4, 1957.
- The United States conducts its first hydrogen bomb explosion test.
- The invention of the modern Solar cell.
- The first Passenger jets enter service.
- The U.S. uses Federal prisons, mental institutions and pharmacological testing volunteers to test drugs like LSD and chlorpromazine. Also started experimenting with the transorbital lobotomy.
- President Harry S. Truman inaugurated transcontinental television service on September 4, 1951, when he made a speech to the nation. AT&T carried his address from San Francisco and it was viewed from the west coast to the east coast at the same time.
- Luna 2 touched down on the surface of the Moon, making it the first spacecraft to land on lunar surface, and the first to make contact with another celestial body on September 13, 1959.
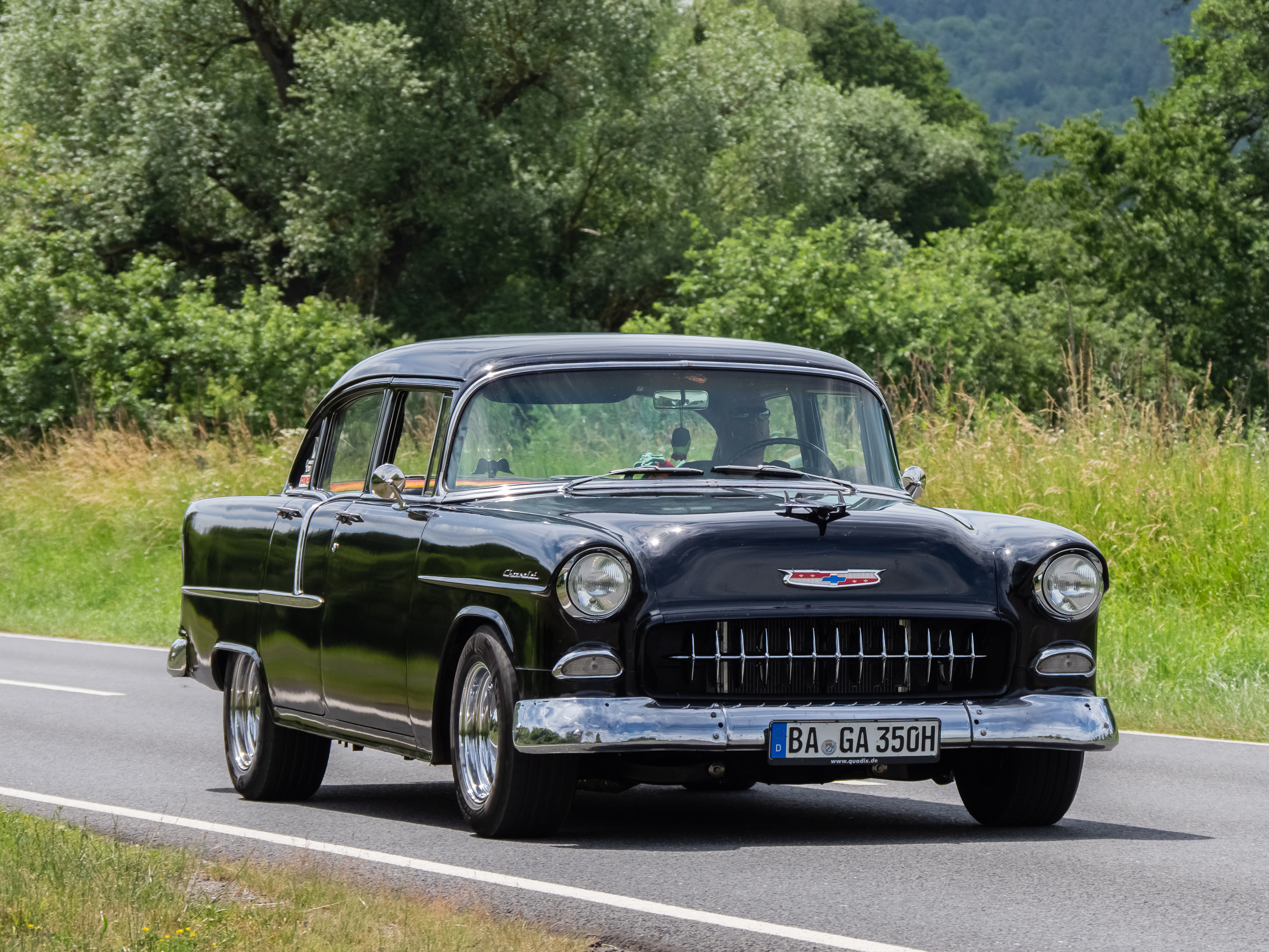
Chevrolet Bel Air 1955. A typical mid-1950s car.

=== Science ===
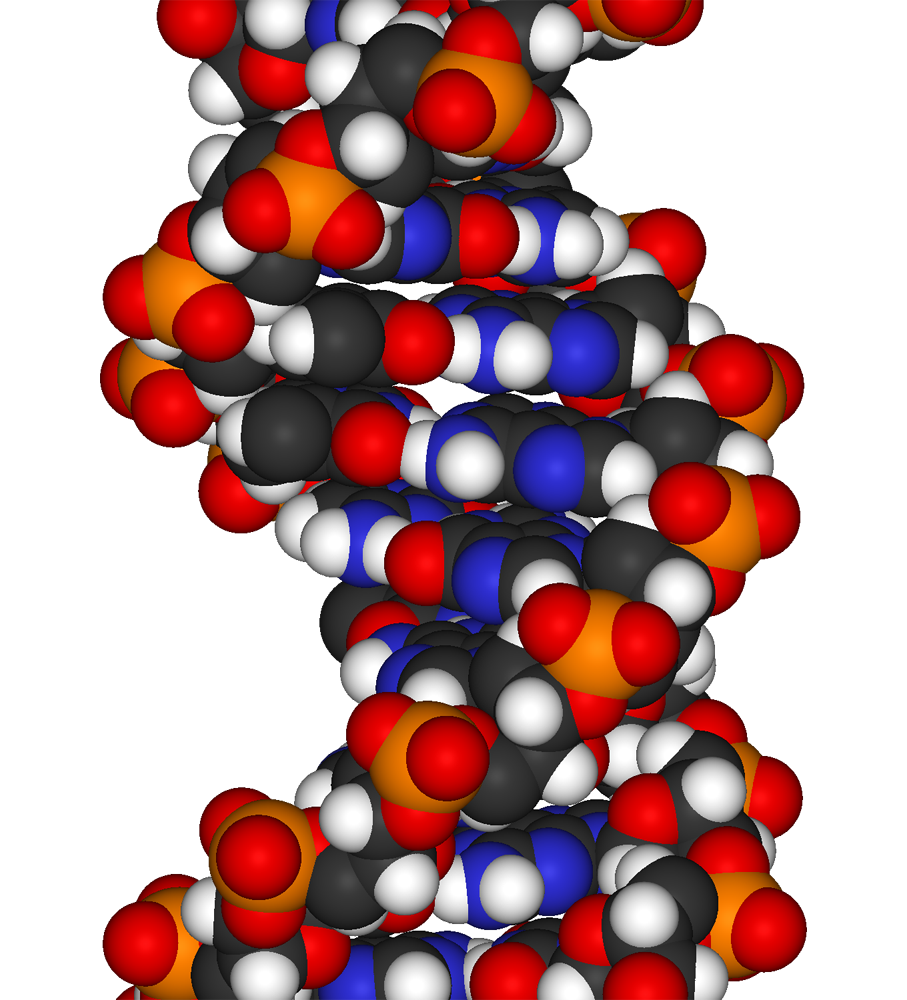
Francis Crick and James Watson discover the spiral structure of DNA

- 1950 – an immunization vaccine is produced for polio.
- 1951 – the first human cervical cancer cells were cultured outside a body, from Henrietta Lacks. The cells are known as HeLa cells and are the first and most commonly used immortalised cell line.
- 1952 – Francis Crick and James Watson discover the double-helix structure of DNA. Rosalind Franklin contributed to the discovery of the double-helix structure.
- 1952 – the Apgar score, a scale for newborn viability, is invented by Virginia Apgar.
- 1953 – the first transistor computer is built at the University of Manchester
- 1954 – the world's first nuclear power plant is opened in Obninsk near Moscow.
- 1956 – one of the first forms of correction fluid is invented by Bette Nesmith Graham, the founder of the Liquid Paper company
- 1957 – the Immunosuppressive drug Azathioprine, used in rheumatoid arthritis, granulomatosis with polyangiitis, Crohn's disease, ulcerative colitis, and in kidney transplants to prevent rejection, is first synthesized by Gertrude B. Elion and George H. Hitchings.
- The first successful ultrasound test of the heart activity.
- NASA is organized.

== Popular culture ==
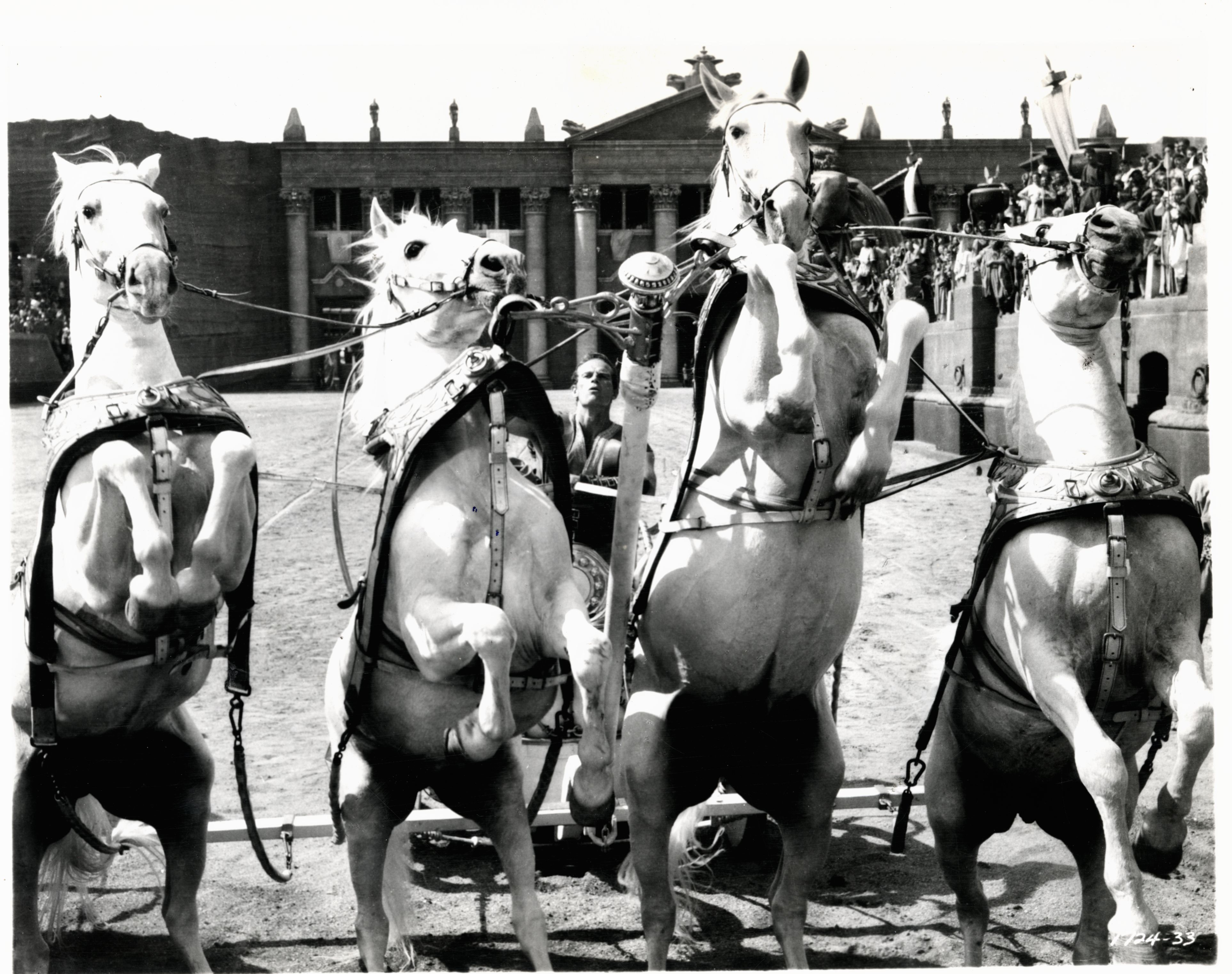
Popular films of the 1950s included Ben-Hur, Singin' in the Rain, Some Like It Hot, Sunset Boulevard, Rebel Without a Cause, On the Waterfront, The Bridge on the River Kwai, All About Eve, Rear Window, The Searchers, Lady and the Tramp, North by Northwest, 12 Angry Men, and Vertigo.

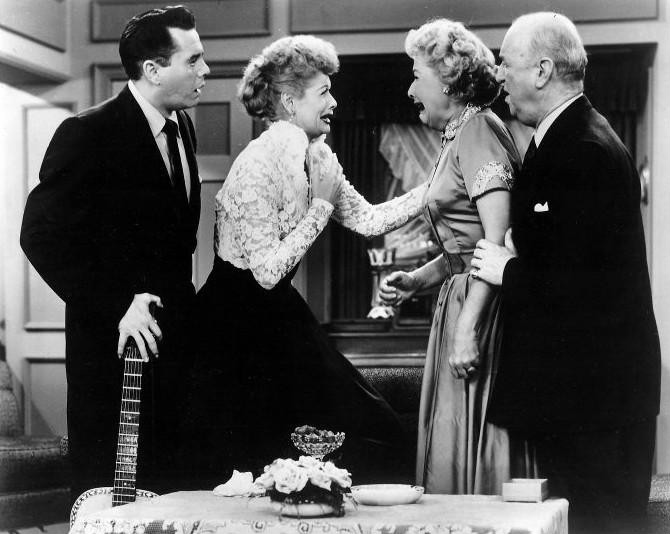
Television became a central feature of daily life during the Golden Age of Television, with popular shows such as I Love Lucy, The Honeymooners, The Ed Sullivan Show, Gunsmoke, Lassie, The Lone Ranger, Leave It to Beaver, Father Knows Best, Howdy Doody, and The Adventures of Ozzie and Harriet.

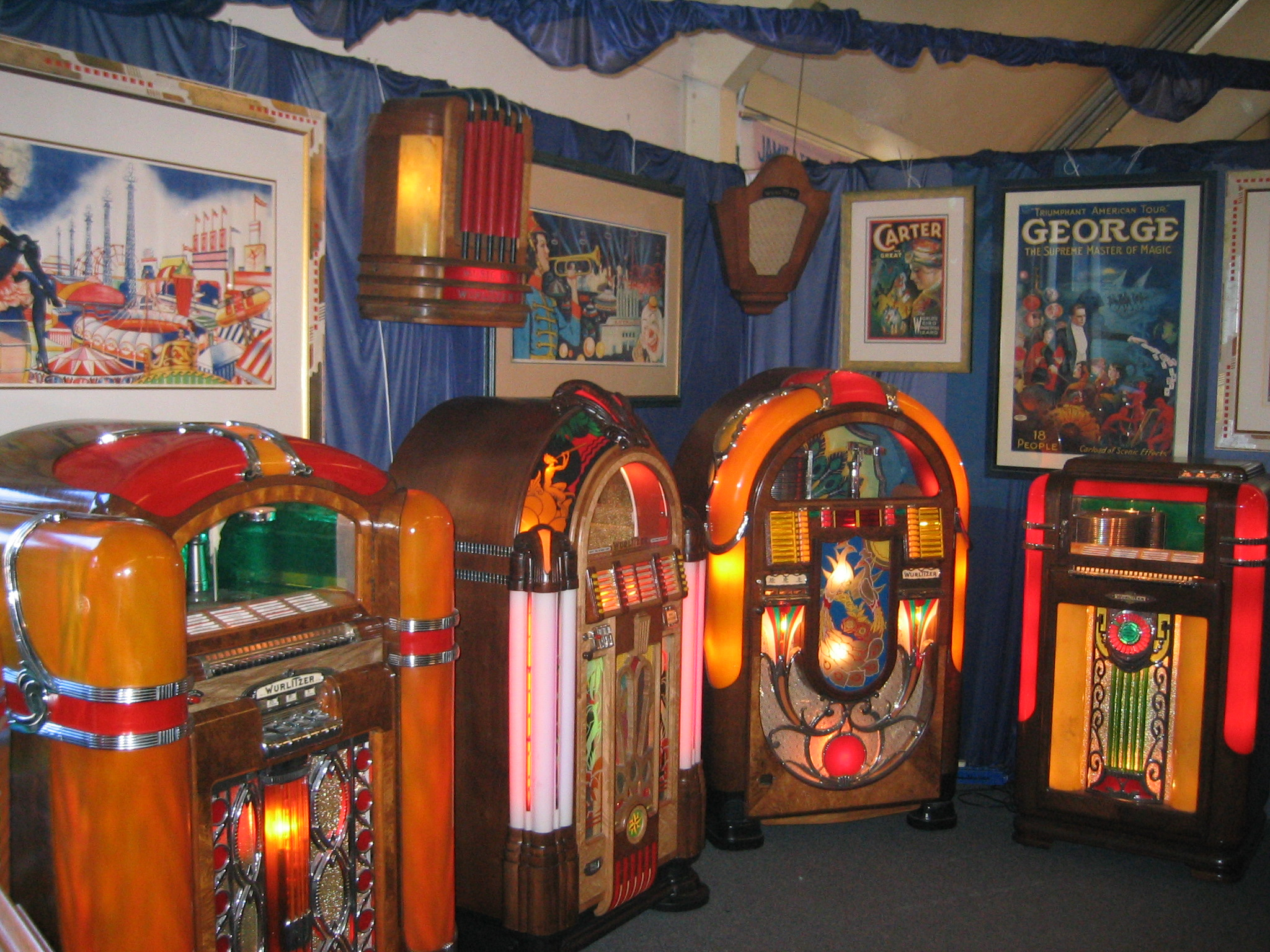
Jukeboxes in diners and soda fountains were central social fixtures, allowing young people to gather, listen to popular music, and shape emerging teen identity and dating culture.

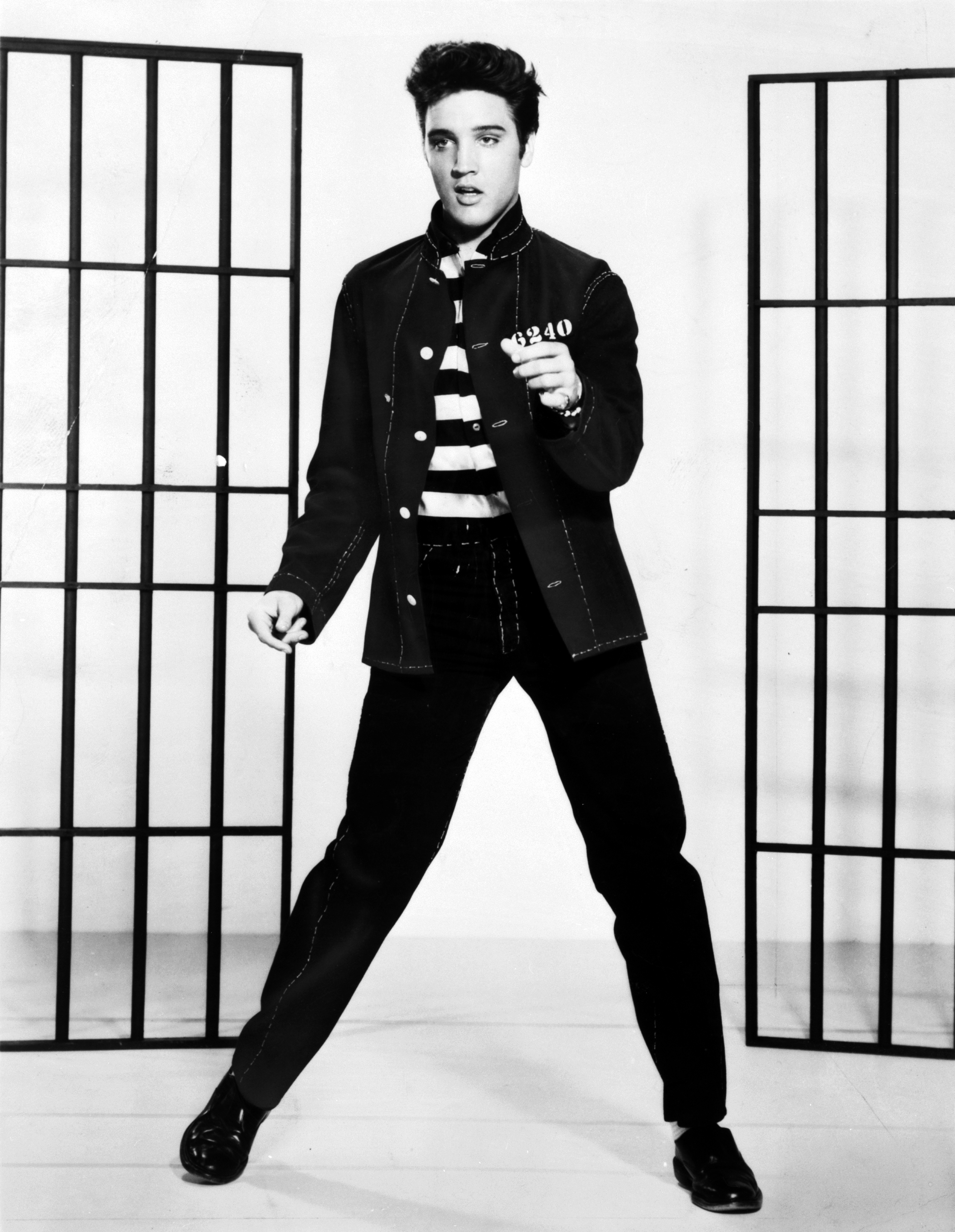
The rise of rock and roll transformed youth culture, with artists such as Elvis Presley, Chuck Berry, Little Richard, Buddy Holly, Jerry Lee Lewis, Fats Domino, and The Everly Brothers.

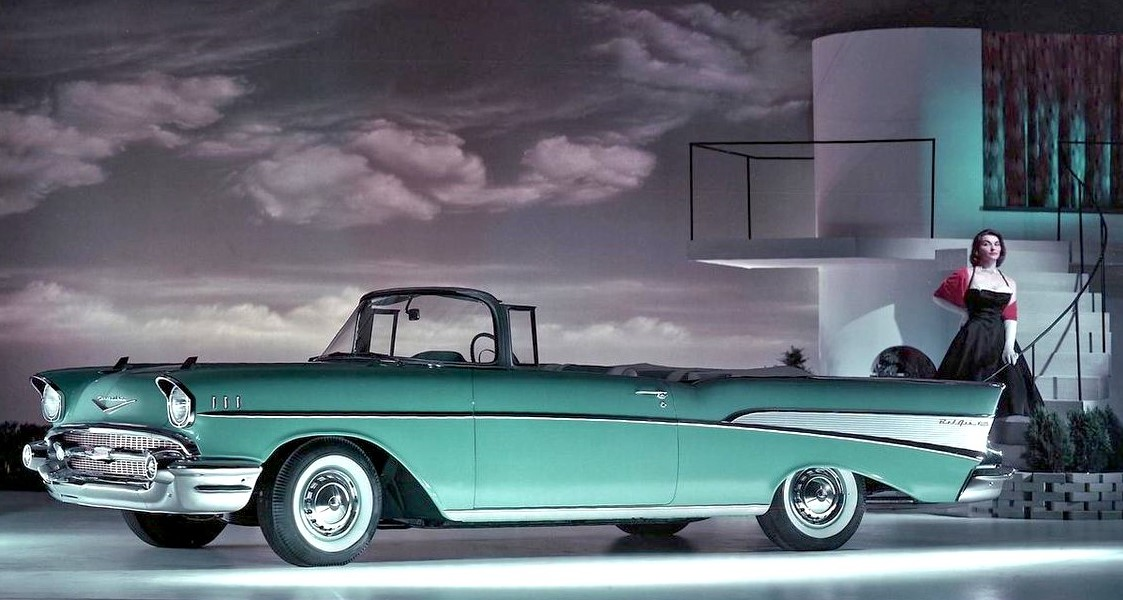
Automobile ownership expanded significantly, with stylized cars such as the Chevrolet Bel Air symbolizing postwar prosperity, suburbanization, and the growing importance of car culture in everyday life.

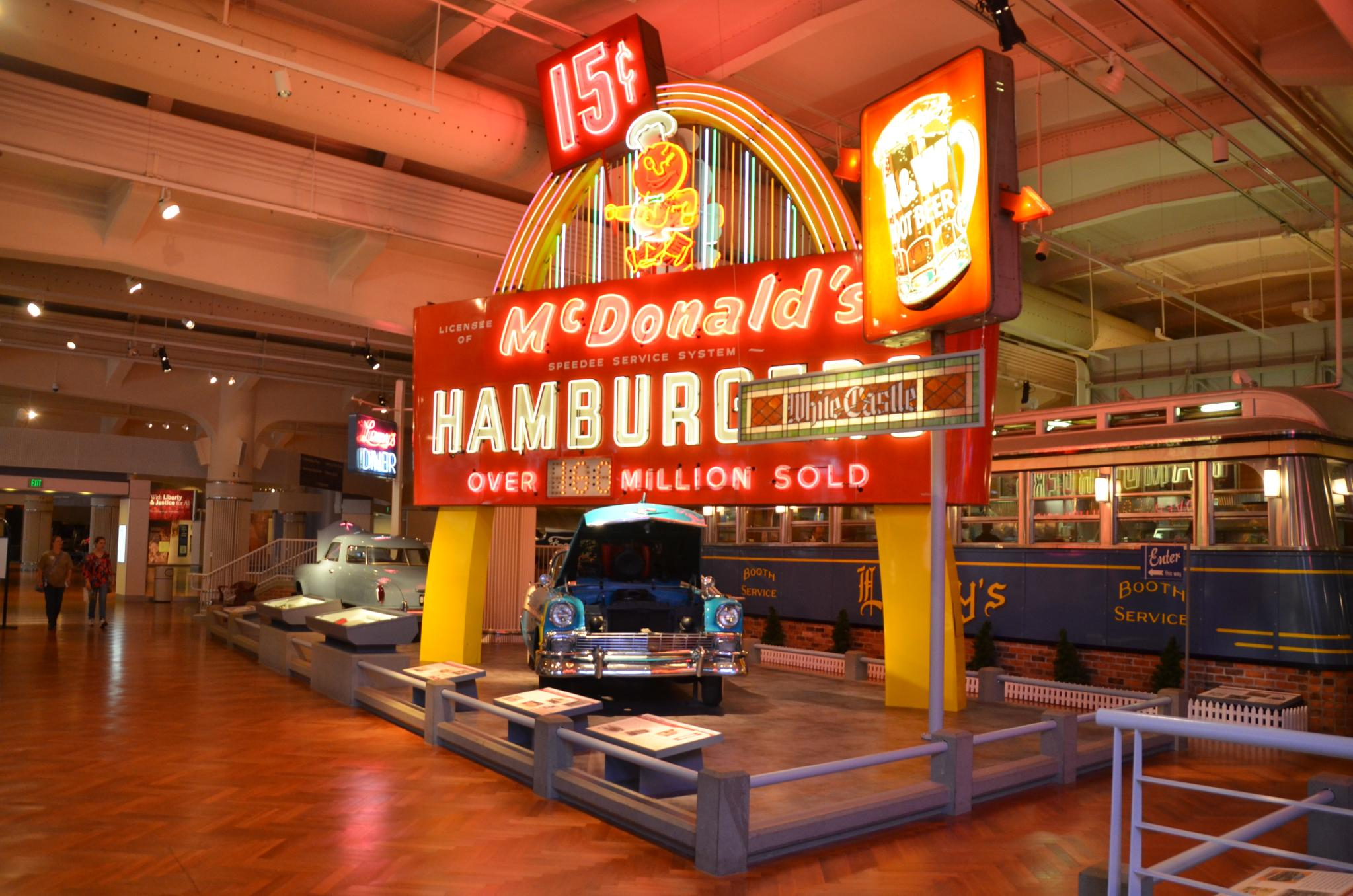
Many restaurant chains that later became global brands, including McDonald's, Burger King, IHOP, Pizza Hut, and Denny's, were founded or expanded during the 1950s.

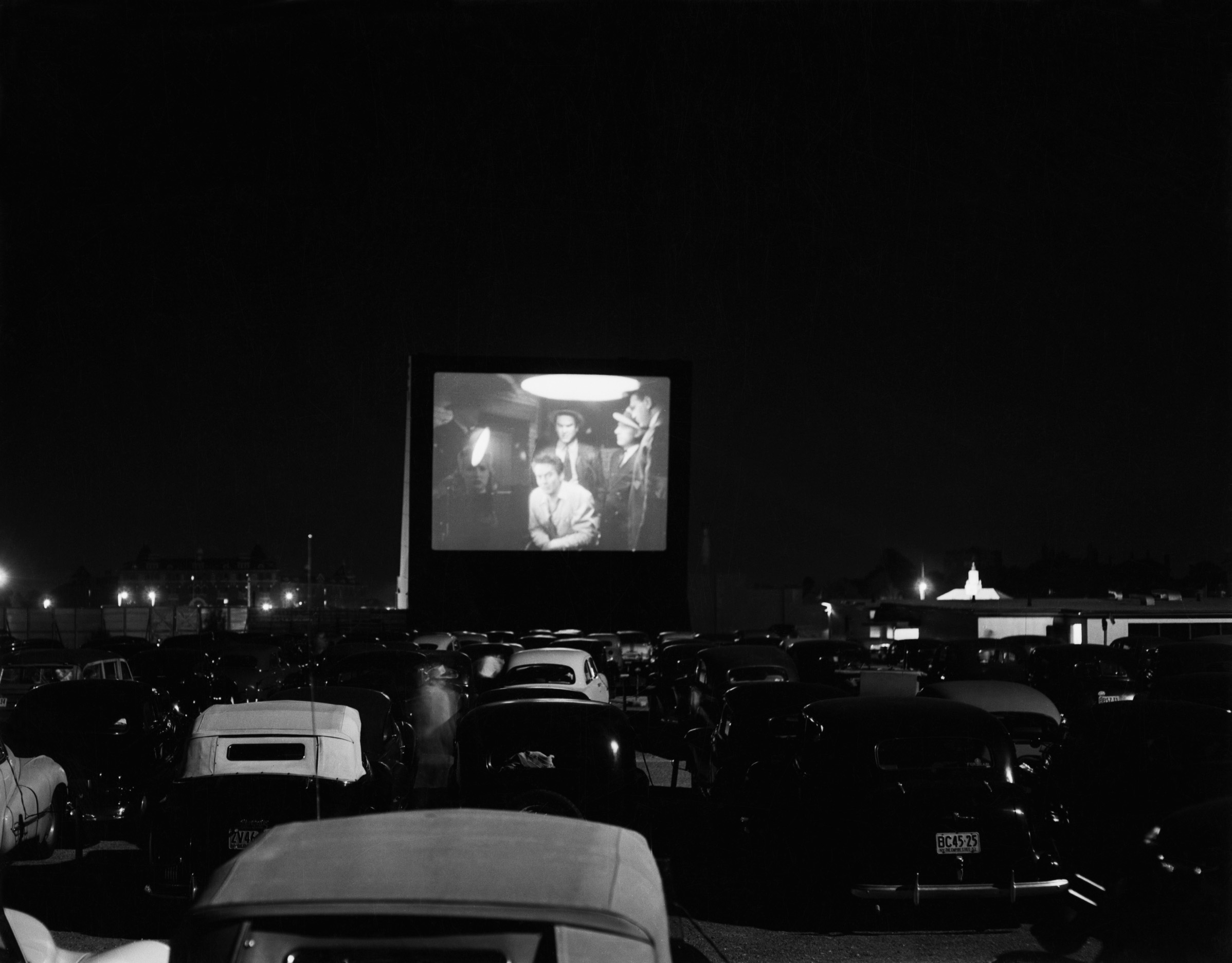
Drive-in theaters flourished as a popular and affordable form of entertainment, particularly for families and teenagers, combining film viewing with car culture.

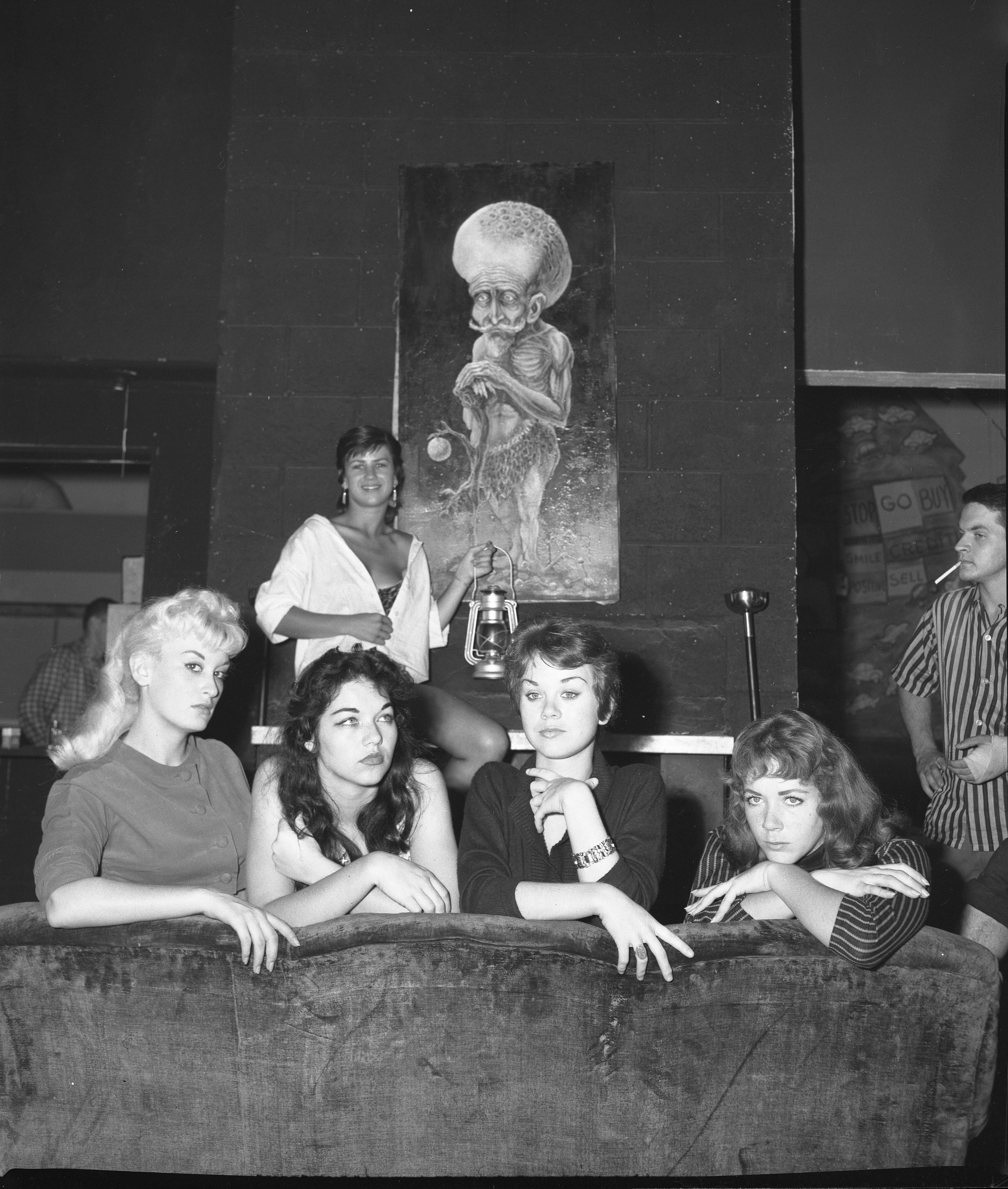
The Beatnik movement emerged as a small but influential countercultural trend, emphasizing artistic expression, nonconformity, and early forms of postwar cultural dissent.

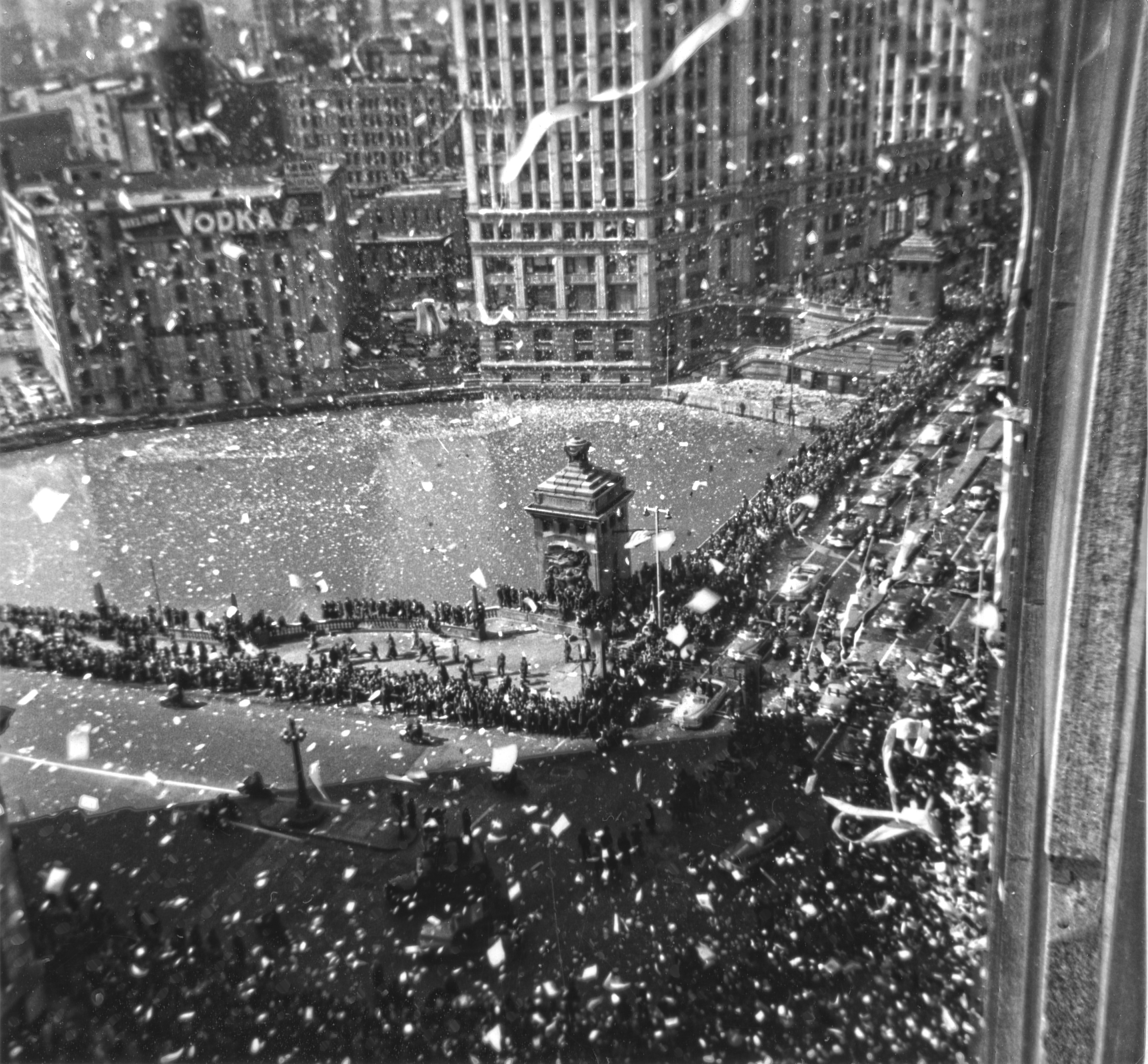
Douglas MacArthur receives a ticker tape parade in Chicago April 26, 1951. In the 1950s, on the back of an unprecedented economic boom, patriotism soared. By extension military heroes like MacArthur remained a prominent part of the national sphere

=== Music ===
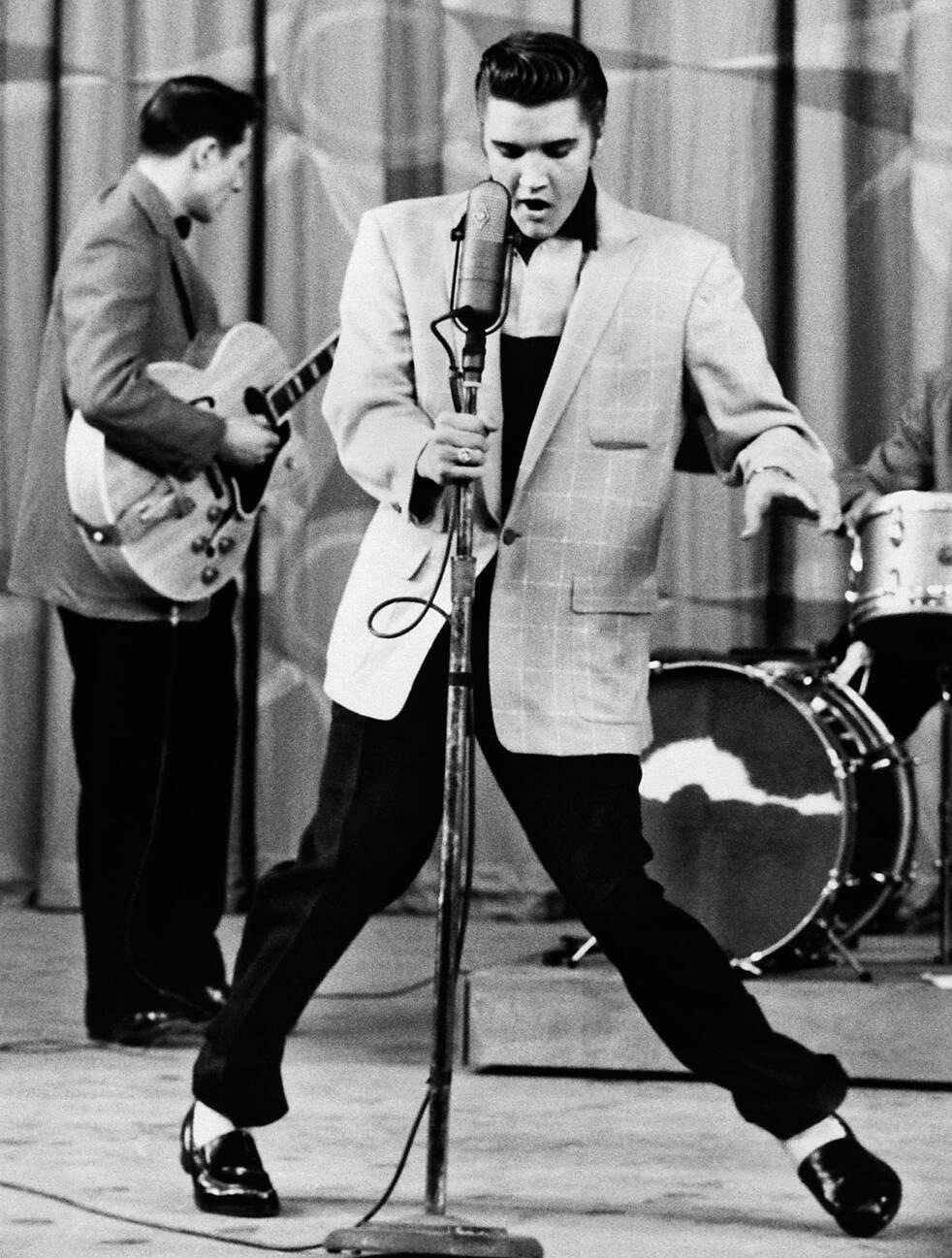
Elvis Presley was the best-selling musical artist of the decade. He is considered as the leading figure of the rock and roll and rockabilly movement of the 1950s.

Popular music in the early 1950s was essentially a continuation of the crooner sound of the previous decade, with less emphasis on the jazz-influenced big band style and more emphasis on a conservative, operatic, symphonic style of music. Frank Sinatra, Tony Bennett, Frankie Laine, Patti Page, Judy Garland, Johnnie Ray, Kay Starr, Perry Como, Bing Crosby, Rosemary Clooney, Dean Martin, Georgia Gibbs, Eddie Fisher, Teresa Brewer, Dinah Shore, Kitty Kallen, Joni James, Peggy Lee, Julie London, Toni Arden, June Valli, Doris Day, Arthur Godfrey, Tennessee Ernie Ford, Guy Mitchell, Nat King Cole, and vocal groups like the Mills Brothers, The Ink Spots, The Four Lads, The Four Aces, The Chordettes, The Fontane Sisters, The Hilltoppers and the Ames Brothers. Jo Stafford's "You Belong To Me" was the #1 song of 1952 on the Billboard Top 100 chart.

The middle of the decade saw a change in the popular music landscape as classic pop was swept off the charts by rock-and-roll. Crooners such as Eddie Fisher, Perry Como, and Patti Page, who had dominated the first half of the decade, found their access to the pop charts significantly curtailed by the decade's end. Doo-wop entered the pop charts in the 1950s. Its popularity soon spawns the parody "Who Put the Bomp (in the Bomp, Bomp, Bomp)".

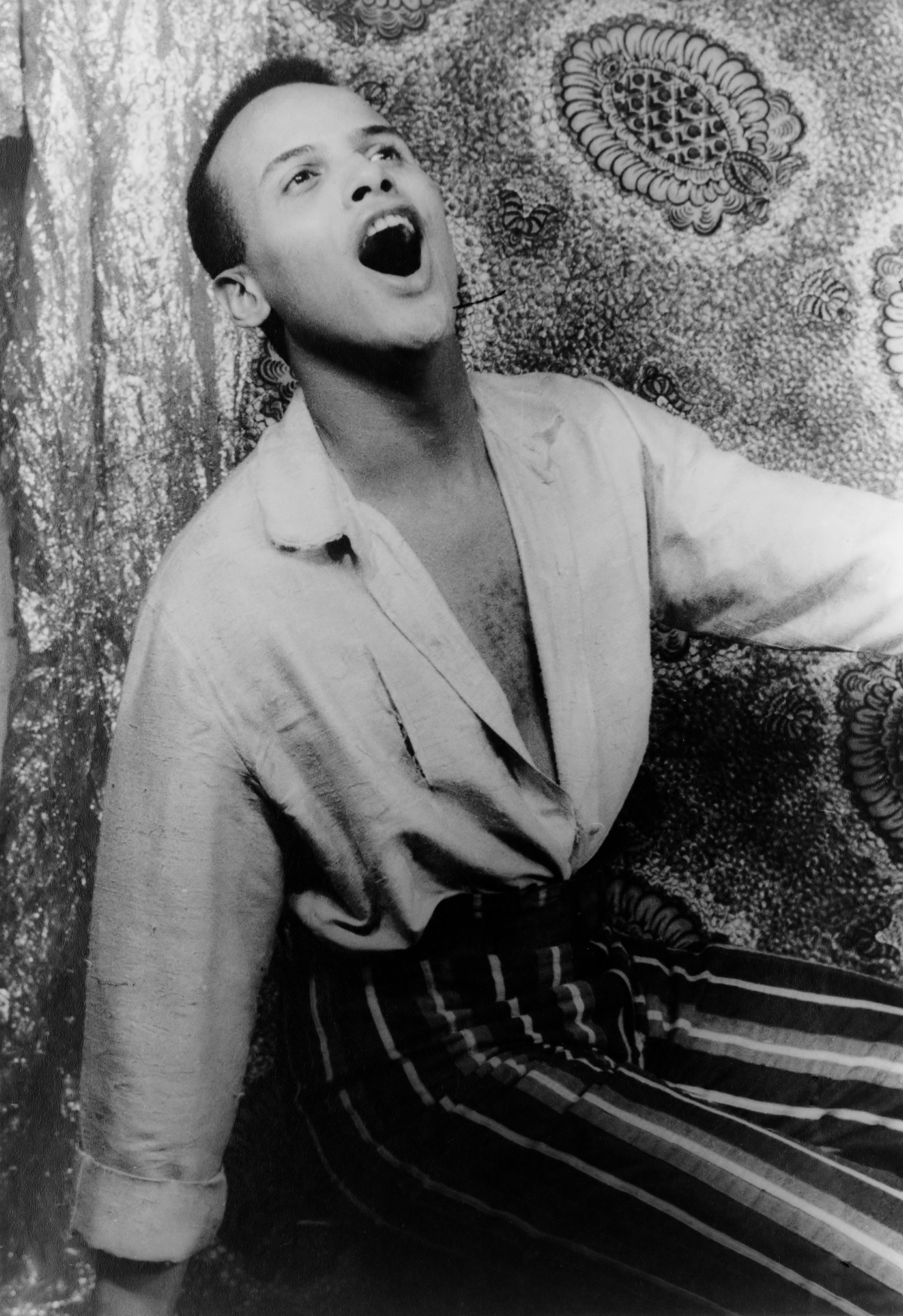
Harry Belafonte in 1954, whose breakthrough album Calypso (1956) was the first million-selling LP by a single artist.

Rock-n-roll emerged in the mid-1950s with Little Richard, Elvis Presley, Chuck Berry, Sam Cooke, Jackie Wilson, Gene Vincent, Fats Domino, James Brown, Bo Diddley, Buddy Holly, Bobby Darin, Ritchie Valens, Duane Eddy, Eddie Cochran, Brenda Lee, Bobby Vee, Connie Francis, Neil Sedaka, Pat Boone, Ricky Nelson, Tommy Steele, Billy Fury, Marty Wilde and Cliff Richard being notable exponents. The genre continued to evolve, with multiple artists drawing on the music from the prior decade, such as genre defining works of 'Godmother of Rock and Roll' Sister Rosetta Tharpe whose 1944 'Strange Things Happening Every Day' is considered one of the first rock and roll records, and who has been cited as considerable influence to said artists Little Richard, Jerry Lee Lewis, and Elvis, to name a few.

In the mid-1950s, Elvis Presley became the leading figure of the newly popular sound of rock and roll with a series of network television appearances and chart-topping records. Chuck Berry, with "Maybellene" (1955), "Roll Over Beethoven" (1956), "Rock and Roll Music" (1957) and "Johnny B. Goode" (1958), refined and developed the major elements that made rock and roll distinctive, focusing on teen life and introducing guitar solos and showmanship that would be a major influence on subsequent rock music. Bill Haley, Presley, Jerry Lee Lewis, The Everly Brothers, Carl Perkins, Johnny Cash, Conway Twitty, Johnny Horton, and Marty Robbins were Rockabilly musicians. Doo-wop was another popular genre at the time. Popular Doo Wop and Rock-n-Roll bands of the mid to late 1950s include The Platters, The Flamingos, The Dells, The Silhouettes, Frankie Lymon and The Teenagers, Little Anthony and The Imperials, Danny & the Juniors, The Coasters, The Drifters, The Del-Vikings and Dion and the Belmonts.

The new music differed from previous styles in that it was primarily targeted at the teenager market, which became a distinct entity for the first time in the 1950s as growing prosperity meant that young people did not have to grow up as quickly or be expected to support a family. Rock-and-roll proved to be a difficult phenomenon for older Americans to accept and there were widespread accusations of its being a communist-orchestrated scheme to corrupt the youth, although rock and roll was extremely market-based and capitalistic.

Jazz stars in the 1950s who came into prominence in their genres called bebop, hard bop, cool jazz and the blues, at this time included Lester Young, Ben Webster, Charlie Parker, Dizzy Gillespie, Miles Davis, John Coltrane, Thelonious Monk, Charles Mingus, Art Tatum, Bill Evans, Ahmad Jamal, Oscar Peterson, Gil Evans, Jerry Mulligan, Cannonball Adderley, Stan Getz, Chet Baker, Dave Brubeck, Art Blakey, Max Roach, the Miles Davis Quintet, the Modern Jazz Quartet, Ella Fitzgerald, Ray Charles, Sarah Vaughan, Dinah Washington, Nina Simone, and Billie Holiday.

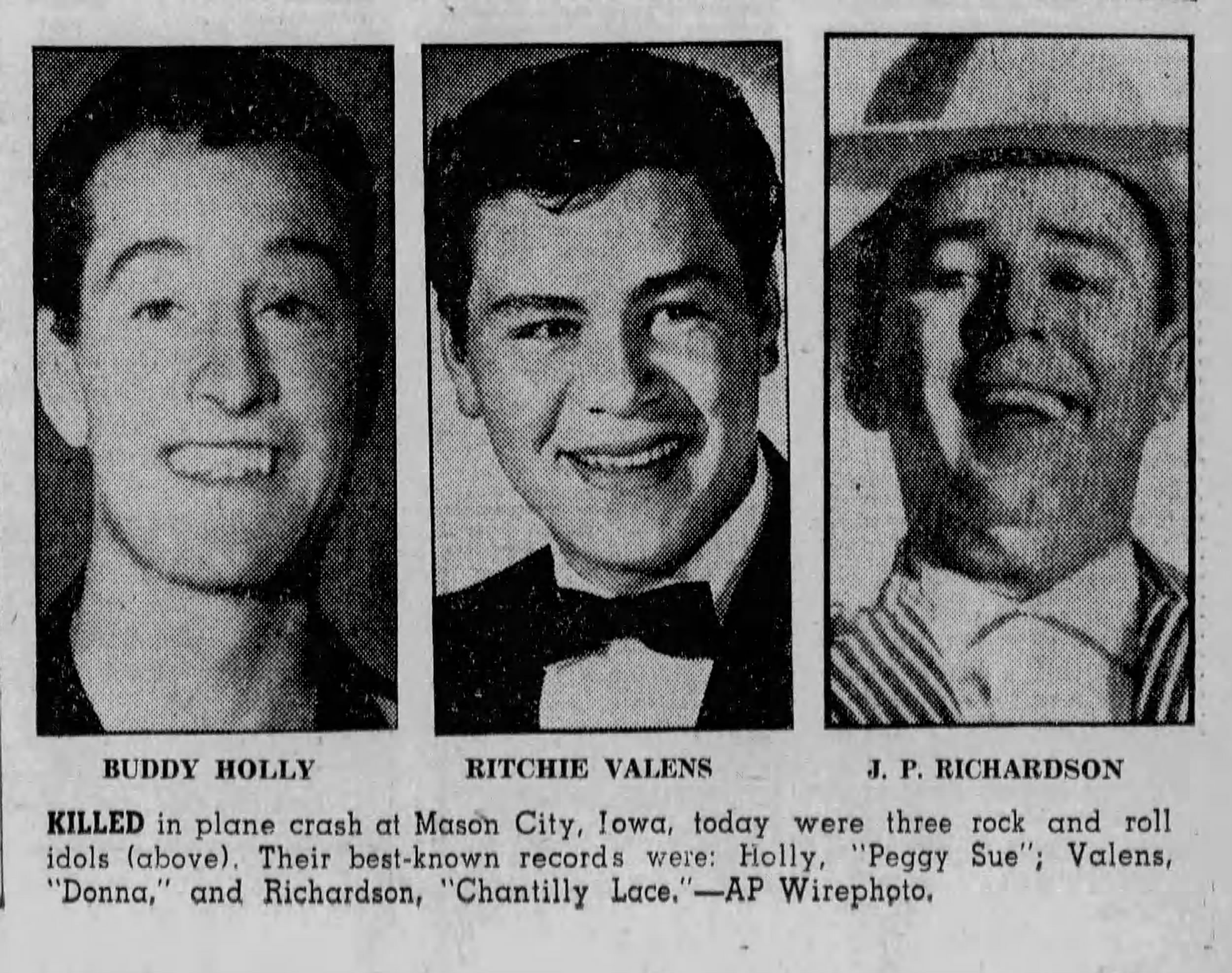
Newspaper clipping on "The Day the Music Died"

The American folk music revival became a phenomenon in the United States in the 1950s to mid-1960s with the initial success of The Weavers who popularized the genre. Their sound, and their broad repertoire of traditional folk material and topical songs inspired other groups such as the Kingston Trio, the Chad Mitchell Trio, The New Christy Minstrels, and the "collegiate folk" groups such as The Brothers Four, The Four Freshmen, The Four Preps, and The Highwaymen. All featured tight vocal harmonies and a repertoire at least initially rooted in folk music and topical songs.

On 3 February 1959, a chartered plane transporting the three American rock and roll musicians Buddy Holly, Ritchie Valens and J. P. "The Big Bopper" Richardson goes down in foggy conditions near Clear Lake, Iowa, killing all four occupants on board, including pilot Roger Peterson. The tragedy is later termed "The Day the Music Died", popularized in Don McLean's 1971 song "American Pie". This event, combined with the conscription of Presley into the US Army, is often taken to mark the point where the era of 1950s rock-and-roll ended.

=== Television ===
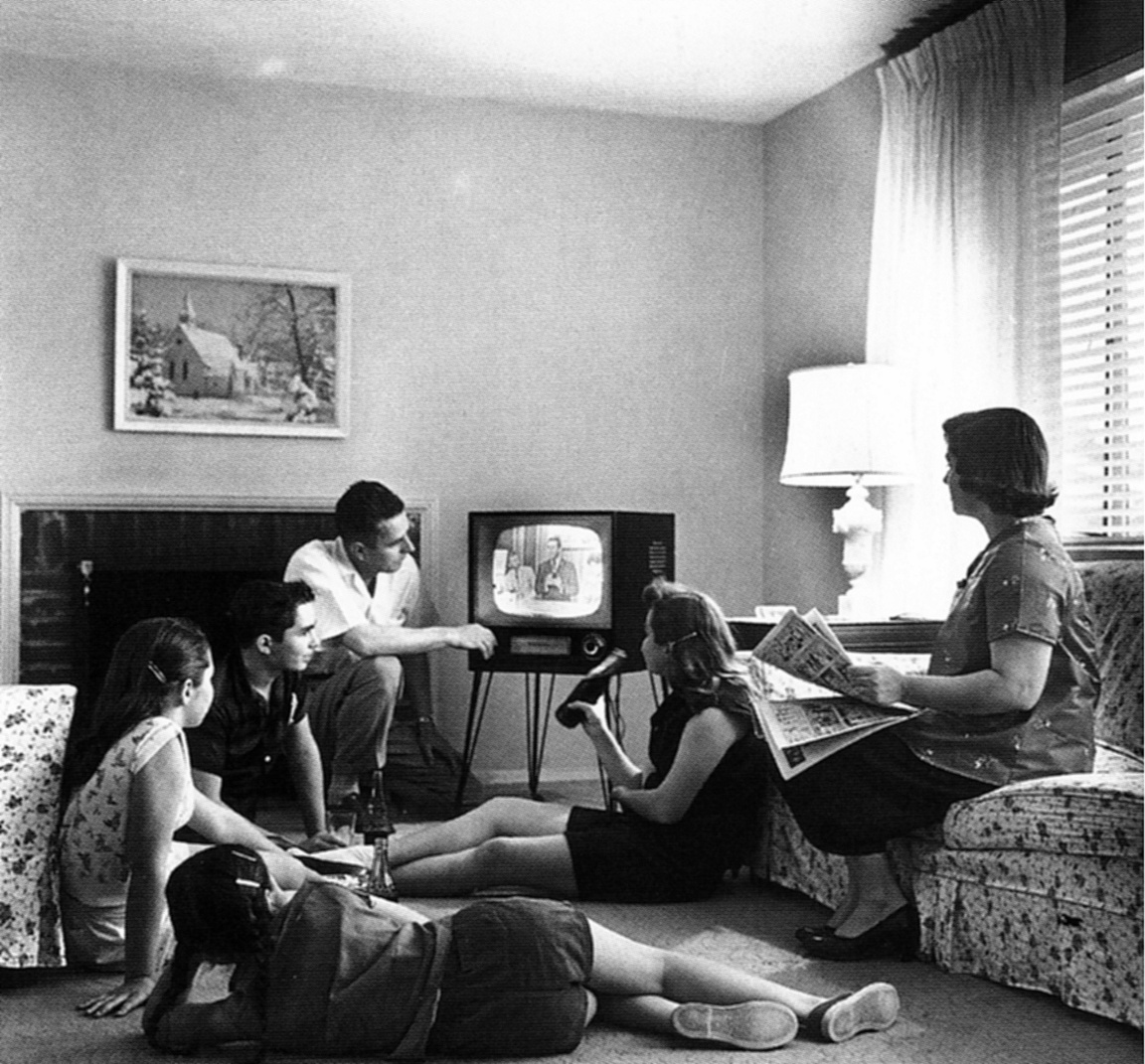
An American family watching television together in 1958.

The 1950s are known as the Golden Age of Television by some people. Sales of TV sets rose tremendously in the 1950s and by 1950 4.4 million families in America had a television set. Americans devoted most of their free time to watching television broadcasts. People spent so much time watching TV, that movie attendance dropped and so did the number of radio listeners. Television revolutionized the way Americans see themselves and the world around them. TV affects all aspects of American culture. "Television affects what we wear, the music we listen to, what we eat, and the news we receive."

ITV was launched with Reddiffusion London(Weekdays)

Some of the most popular shows in the 1950s included I Love Lucy, This Is Your Life, The Ed Sullivan Show, Howdy Doody, The Lone Ranger, The Mickey Mouse Club, Disneyland, Lassie, The Huckleberry Hound Show, The Honeymooners, The Tonight Show, and Alfred Hitchcock Presents.

=== Film ===
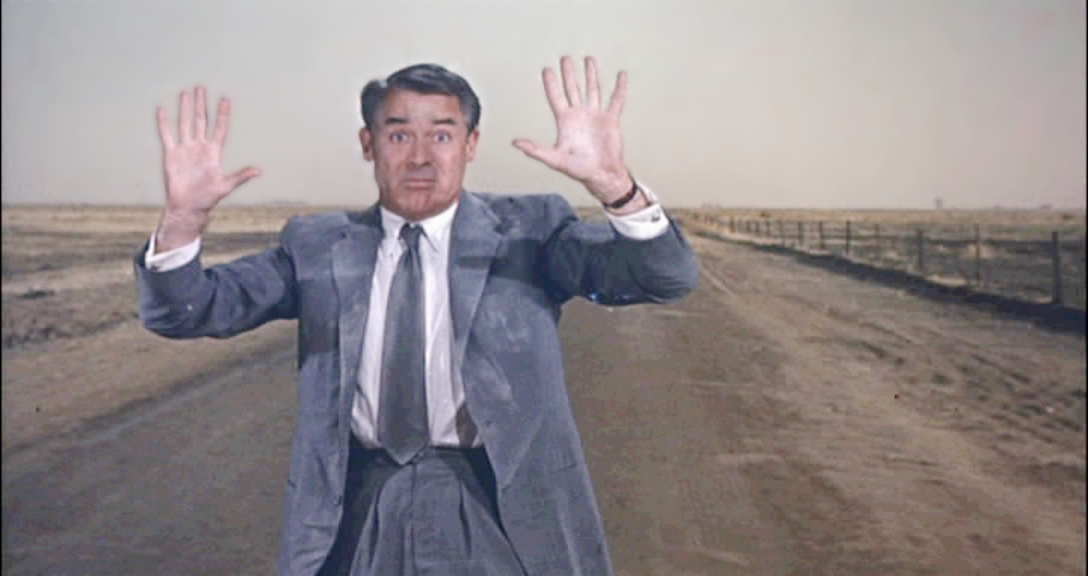
Cary Grant as Roger O. Thornhill in North by Northwest (1959)

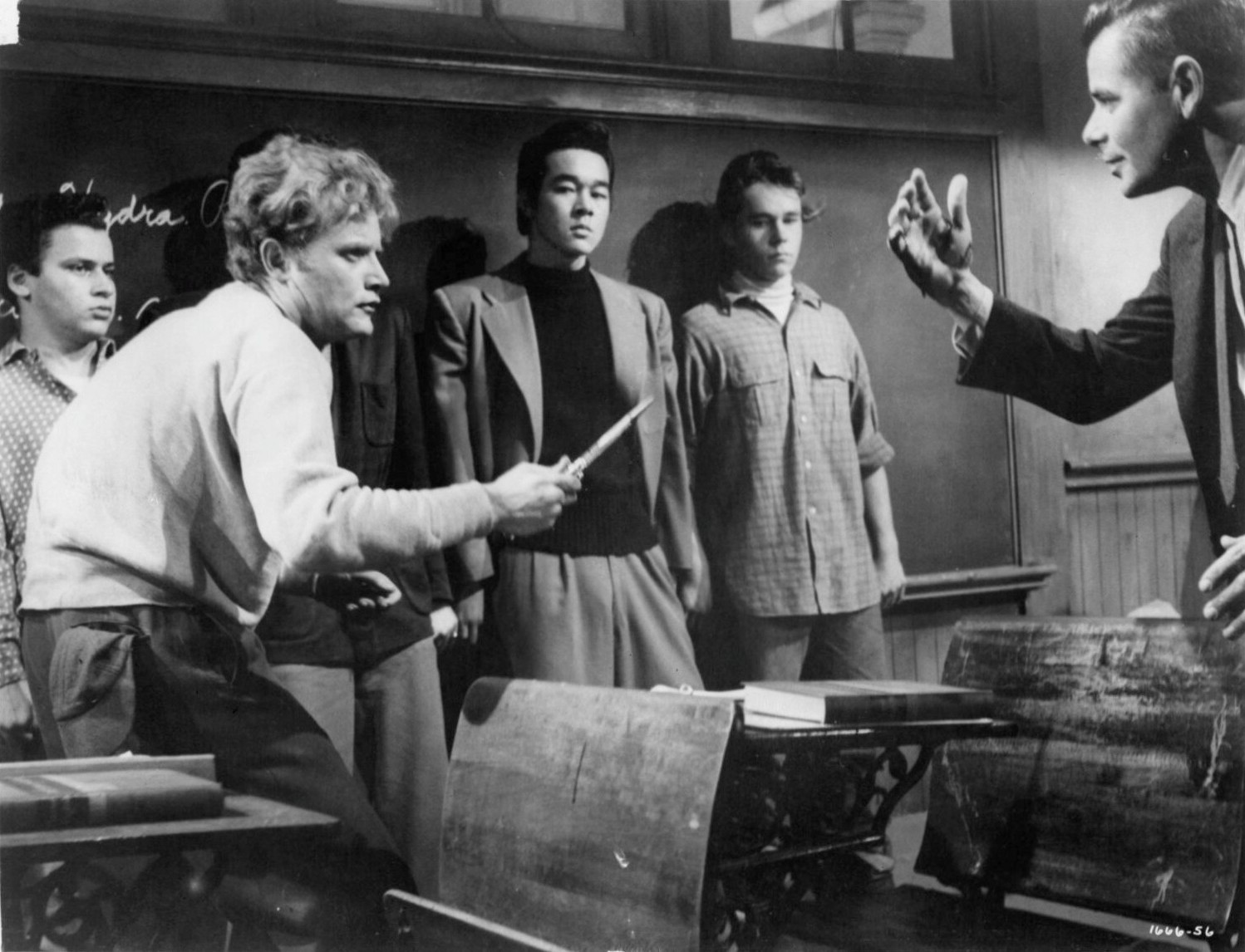
The successes of The Wild One, Blackboard Jungle (pictured) and Rebel Without a Cause are credited with kicking off the teenage rebellion films of the 1950s

European cinema experienced a renaissance in the 1950s following the deprivations of World War II. Italian director Federico Fellini won the first foreign language film Academy Award with La Strada and garnered another Academy Award with Nights of Cabiria. Audrey Hepburn won the Academy Award for Best Actress for her role in the 1953 film Roman Holiday, and Sidney Poitier became the first Black actor to receive an Academy Award nomination for Best Actor for the 1958 film The Defiant Ones (an award he later won in the 1960s).

Similarly with the mid-1950s rush of Rock and Roll and teenage rebellion, the films of Marlon Brando, James Dean and films such as Blackboard Jungle, which introduced rock and roll music to the national consciousness, had a profound effect on American culture.

In Hollywood, the epic Ben-Hur grabbed a record 11 Academy Awards in 1959 and its success gave a new lease of life to motion picture studio MGM.

Beginning in 1953, with Shane and The Robe, widescreen motion pictures became the norm.

The "Golden Era" of 3D cinematography transpired during the 1950s.

Animated films in the 1950s presented by Walt Disney included Cinderella, Alice in Wonderland, Peter Pan, Lady and the Tramp, and Sleeping Beauty.

=== Comics ===
The long-running comic strip Peanuts made its debut in this decade, becoming the most successful comic strip of all time, until its end in 2000, along with the death of creator Charles M. Schulz.

Other comic book characters that debuted in this decade included Martian Manhunter, The Flash (Barry Allen), Asterix, Marmaduke, Dennis the Menace, Dennis and Gnasher, the Smurfs, and Astro Boy.

=== Art movements ===
In the early 1950s abstract expressionism and artists Jackson Pollock and Willem de Kooning were enormously influential. However, by the late 1950s Color Field painting and Barnett Newman and Mark Rothko's paintings became more in focus to the next generation.

Pop art used the iconography of television, photography, comics, cinema and advertising. With its roots in dadaism, it started to take form towards the end of the 1950s when some European artists started to make the symbols and products of the world of advertising and propaganda the main subject of their artistic work. This return of figurative art, in opposition to the abstract expressionism that dominated the aesthetic scene since the end of World War II was dominated by Great Britain until the early 1960s when Andy Warhol, the most known artist of this movement began to show Pop Art in galleries in the United States.

=== Fashion ===
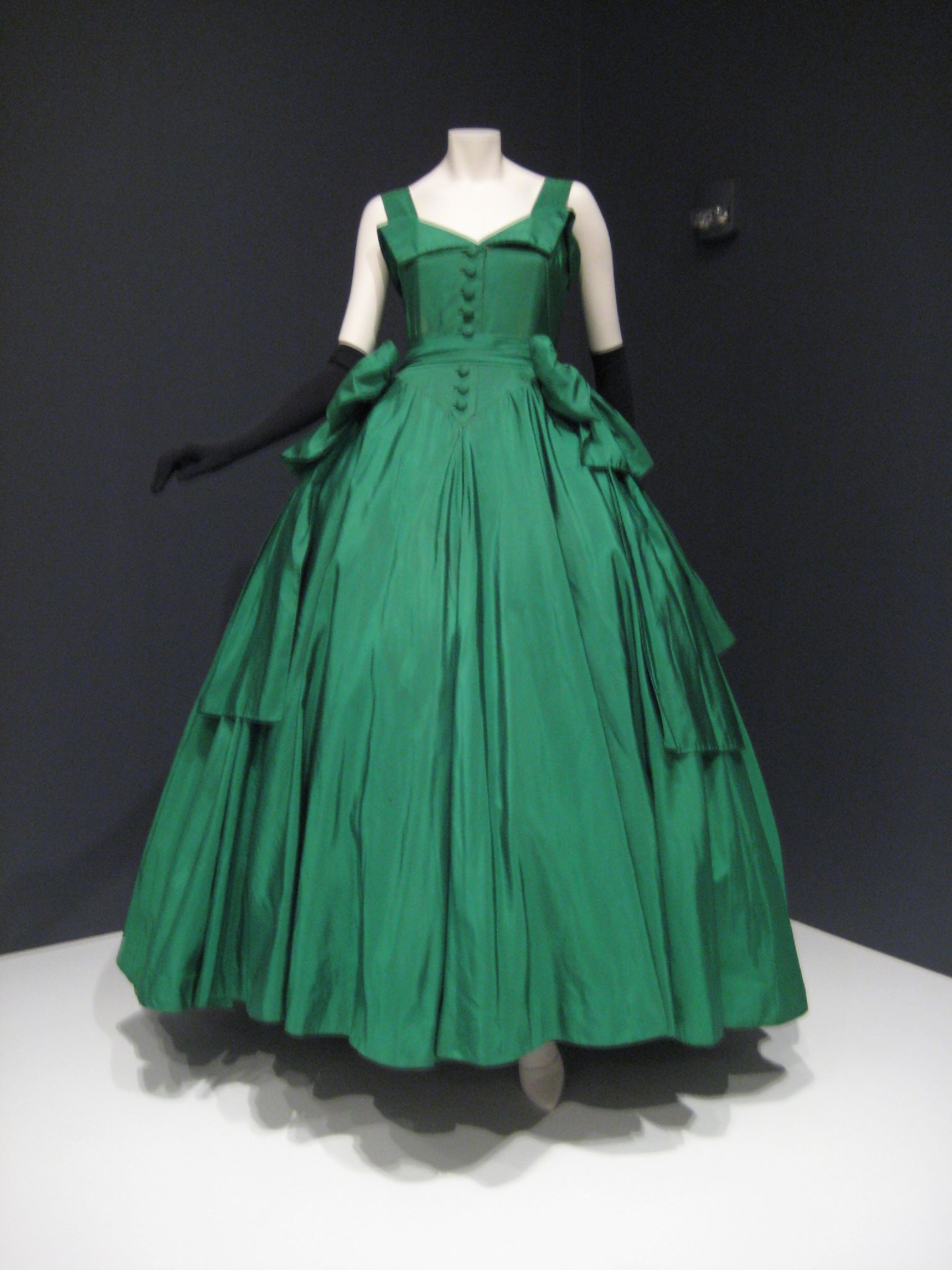
A 1954 evening gown by Christian Dior, the most famous designer in 1950s fashion.

The fashion of the 1950s was defined by a tension between tradition and transformation. In womenswear, the New Look silhouette introduced by Christian Dior in 1947—rounded shoulders, a cinched waist, padded hips, and dramatically full or narrow skirts—dominated the early years of the decade, permeating dress at every social level and price point, while the latter half saw designers gradually exploring simpler, less structured alternatives. The decade has been described as one of "fashion conformity," in which France regained its supremacy as the arbiter of women's dress, with the "elegant triumvirate" of Dior, Jacques Fath, and Pierre Balmain setting a benchmark of style imitated throughout the world, while Cristóbal Balenciaga, Hubert de Givenchy, and a returning Coco Chanel offered compelling alternatives to the prevailing silhouette. Italy emerged during the decade as a significant new fashion center, particularly for sportswear, accessories, and men's tailoring.

The decade was marked by rapid technological change in the textile industry: a succession of new synthetic fibers—including acrylics (1950), polyesters (1953), triacetate (1954), and spandex (1959)—transformed both the production and care of clothing, while permanently stiffened nylon petticoats contributed significantly to the popularity of the era's full skirts. The rise of television as a mass medium created new channels for the spread of fashion information, accelerating the influence of Hollywood stars and popular musicians on everyday dress. The emergence of the teenager as a distinct social category—with its own purchasing power and cultural preferences—proved to have lasting consequences for the fashion industry, as working-class youth subcultures such as Britain's Teddy Boys and America's greasers pioneered styles built around jeans, leather jackets, and rock and roll musicians. Hollywood rebels Marlon Brando and James Dean made the white T-shirt and blue jeans the pervasive youth fashion of the decade, while Elvis Presley's signature pompadour and screen appearances further fueled the working-class aesthetic for both American and international youth.

Among the female fashion icons of the era were Grace Kelly, Audrey Hepburn, Marilyn Monroe, and Brigitte Bardot—who helped popularize the bikini when she posed in one at the Cannes Film Festival in 1953—while the male icons, Brando, Dean, and Presley, represented a radical departure from previous ideals of masculine elegance.

=== Sports ===
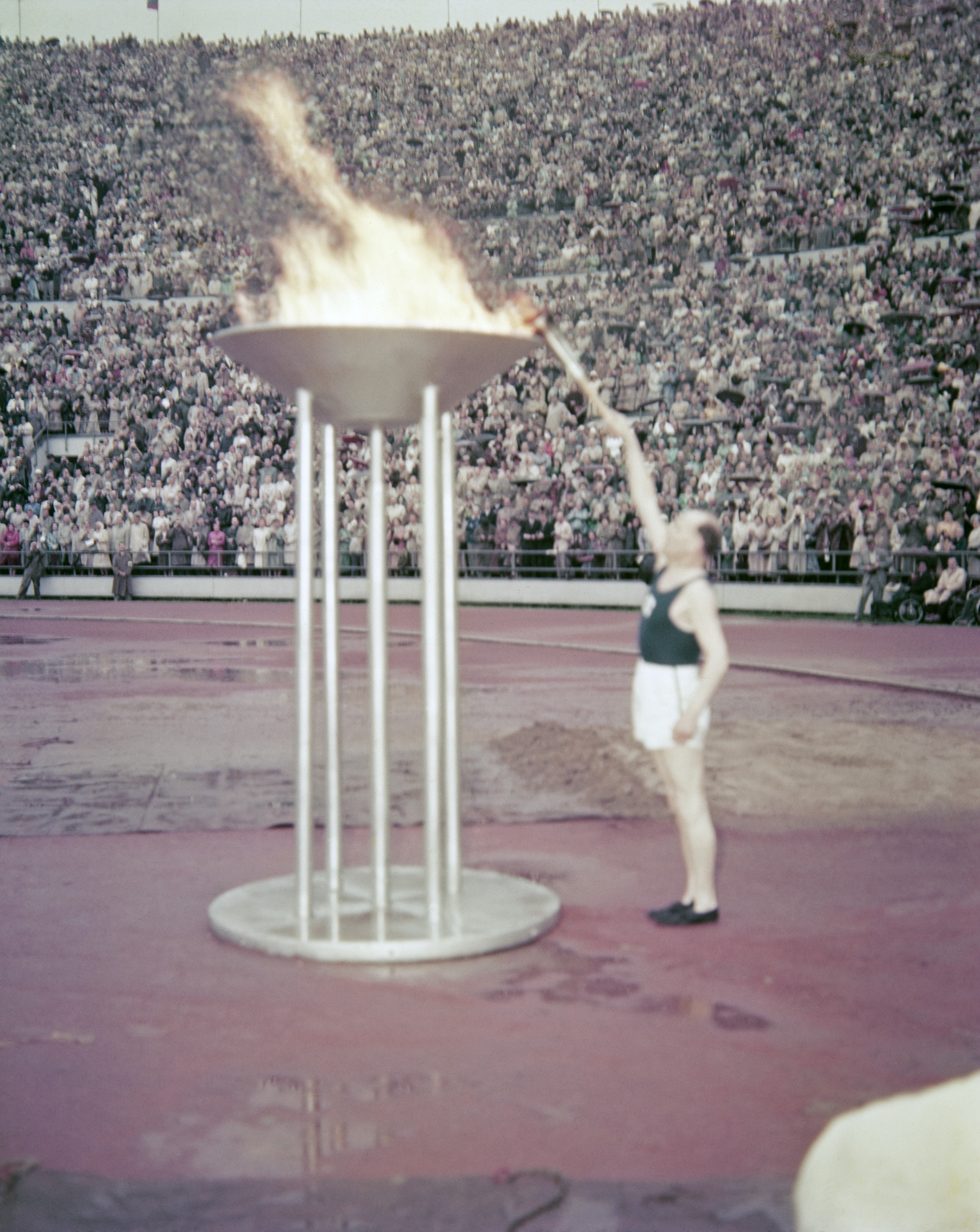
Paavo Nurmi and the Olympic flame in the opening ceremony of the 1952 Summer Olympics

- 1958 the sport of Guts Frisbee created in Eagle Harbor, Michigan
- Inaugural season of Formula One

==== Olympics ====
- 1952 Summer Olympics held in Helsinki, Finland
- 1952 Winter Olympics held in Oslo, Norway
- 1956 Summer Olympics held in Melbourne, Australia
- 1956 Winter Olympics held in Cortina d'Ampezzo, Italy

==== FIFA World Cups ====
- 1950 World Cup hosted by Brazil, won by Uruguay
- 1954 World Cup hosted by Switzerland, won by West Germany
- 1958 World Cup hosted by Sweden, won by Brazil

The 1958 World Cup is notable for marking the debut on the world stage of a then largely unknown 17-year-old Pelé.

== People ==
=== Politics ===
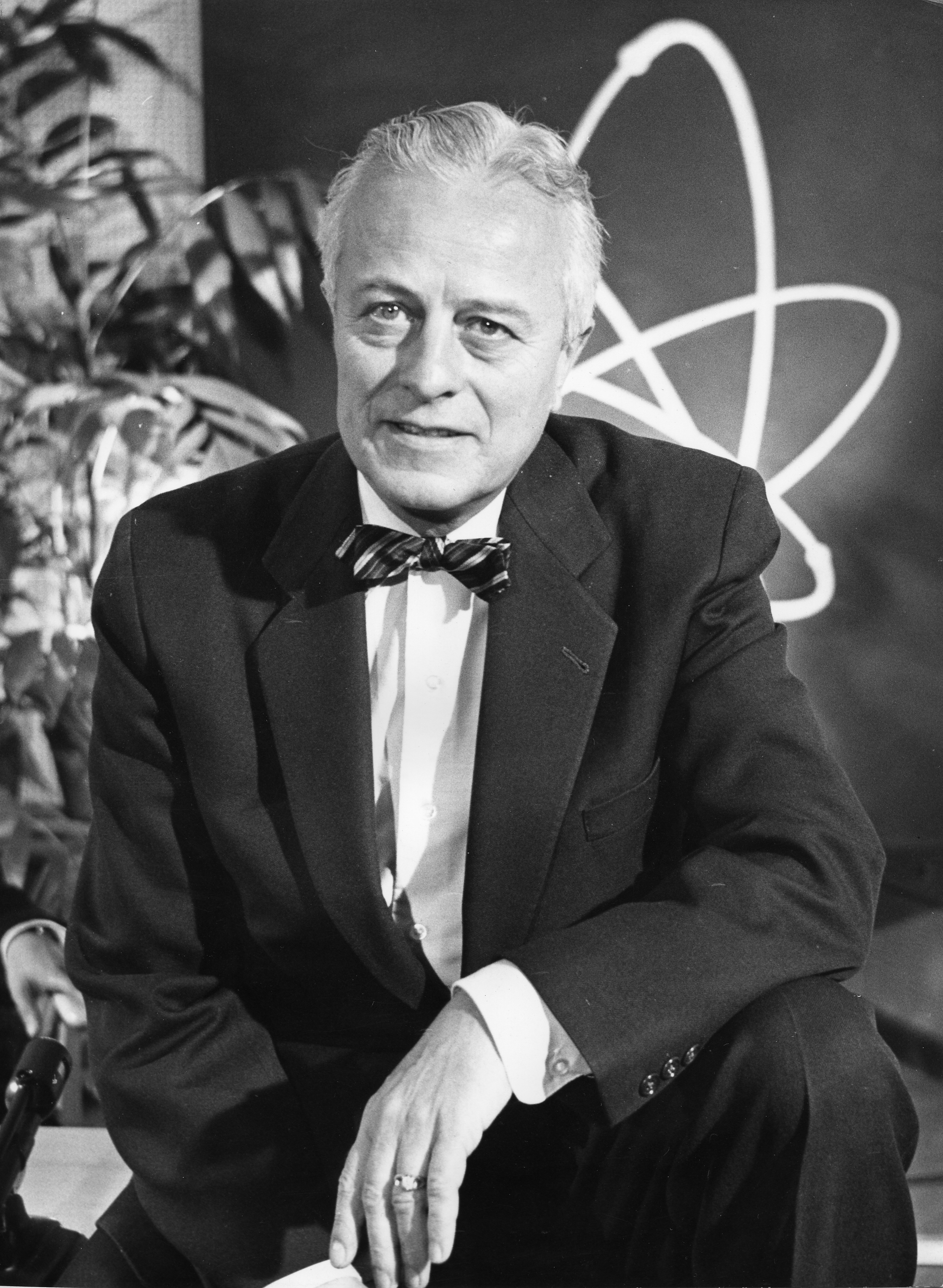
W. Sterling Cole, first Director-general of AIEA

- Eugene Robert Black, President World Bank
- W. Sterling Cole, Director-general International Atomic Energy Agency
- Manuel Fraga, Secretary-general Latin Union
- André François-Poncet, Chairman of the Standing Commission International Red Cross and Red Crescent Movement
- Walter Hallstein, President of the European Commission
- Ivan Konev, Commander-in-chief of the Unified Armed Forces Warsaw Treaty Organization
- Arnold Duncan McNair, Baron McNair, President of the European Court of Human Rights
- David A. Morse, Director-general International Labour Organization
- Ove Nielsen, Secretary-general International Maritime Organization
- Maurice Pate, Executive Director United Nations Children's Fund
- Robert Schuman, President of the European Parliamentary Assembly
- Eric Wyndham White, Executive Secretary World Trade Organization
- Dean Acheson, Secretary of State during the Truman's Administration
- Joseph Raymond McCarthy, U.S. Senator, prominent political figure of US Anti-Communist Movement
- Kurt Schumacher, Leader of Social Democratic Party of Germany and Leader of the Opposition in the West Germany (until 1952)
- Palmiro Togliatti, General Secretary of the Italian Communist Party and Leader of the Opposition in Italy
- Maurice Thorez, General Secretary of the French Communist Party
- Ioannis Pasalidis, President of the United Democratic Left Party of Greece and Leader of the Opposition in Greece

=== Scientists and engineers ===
- Virginia Apgar
- Mohamed Atalla
- John Bardeen
- Richard Bellman
- Nils Bohlin
- Erik Bratt
- Walter Brattain
- Owen Chamberlain
- Carlo Chiti
- Noam Chomsky
- Christopher Cockerell
- Gioacchino Colombo
- Frank Costin
- Francis Crick
- W. Edwards Deming
- George Edwards
- Paul Erdos
- Louis Essen
- Jay Forrester
- Henri de France
- Ilya Frank
- Rosalind Franklin
- Elmer Friedrich
- Calvin Souther Fuller
- Alexander Grothendieck
- Donald Glaser
- Peter Goldmark
- Richard Hamming
- Louis Harold Gray
- Walter Hassan
- Maurice Hilleman
- Dorothy Hogkin
- Grace Hopper
- Alec Issigonis
- Vittorio Jano
- Dawon Kahng
- Pyotr Kapitza
- Maurice Karnaugh
- Kelly Johnson
- Jack Kilby
- Russell Kirsch
- Yuri Knorozov
- Sergei Korolev
- Ludvig Kraus
- Olga Ladyzhenskaya
- Uno Lamm
- Aurelio Lampredi
- Lev Landau
- Sergei Lebedev
- Gunnar Ljungström
- Feodor Lynen
- John Forbes Nash Jr.
- Allen Newell
- Robert Noyce
- Linus Pauling
- Alexander Prokhorov
- Frederick Sanger
- Jonas Salk
- Hans Scherenberg
- Eduard Schüller
- Emilio Segre
- William Shockley
- Kirill Shchelkin
- Herbert A. Simon
- Joseph Simons
- Sverker Sjöström
- Robert Solow
- Fabio Taglioni
- Alfred Tarski
- Alexander Todd
- Victor Toma
- Lino Tonti
- Alan Turing
- Charles Townes
- Rudolf Uhlenhaut
- Wernher von Braun
- Felix Wankel
- James Watson
- Maurice Wilkins
- Chien-Shiung Wu
- Heinz Zemanek

=== Actors and entertainers ===
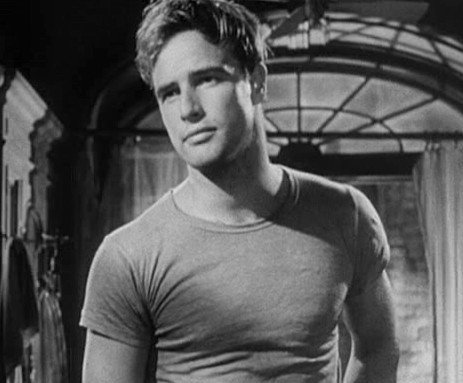
Marlon Brando 1951

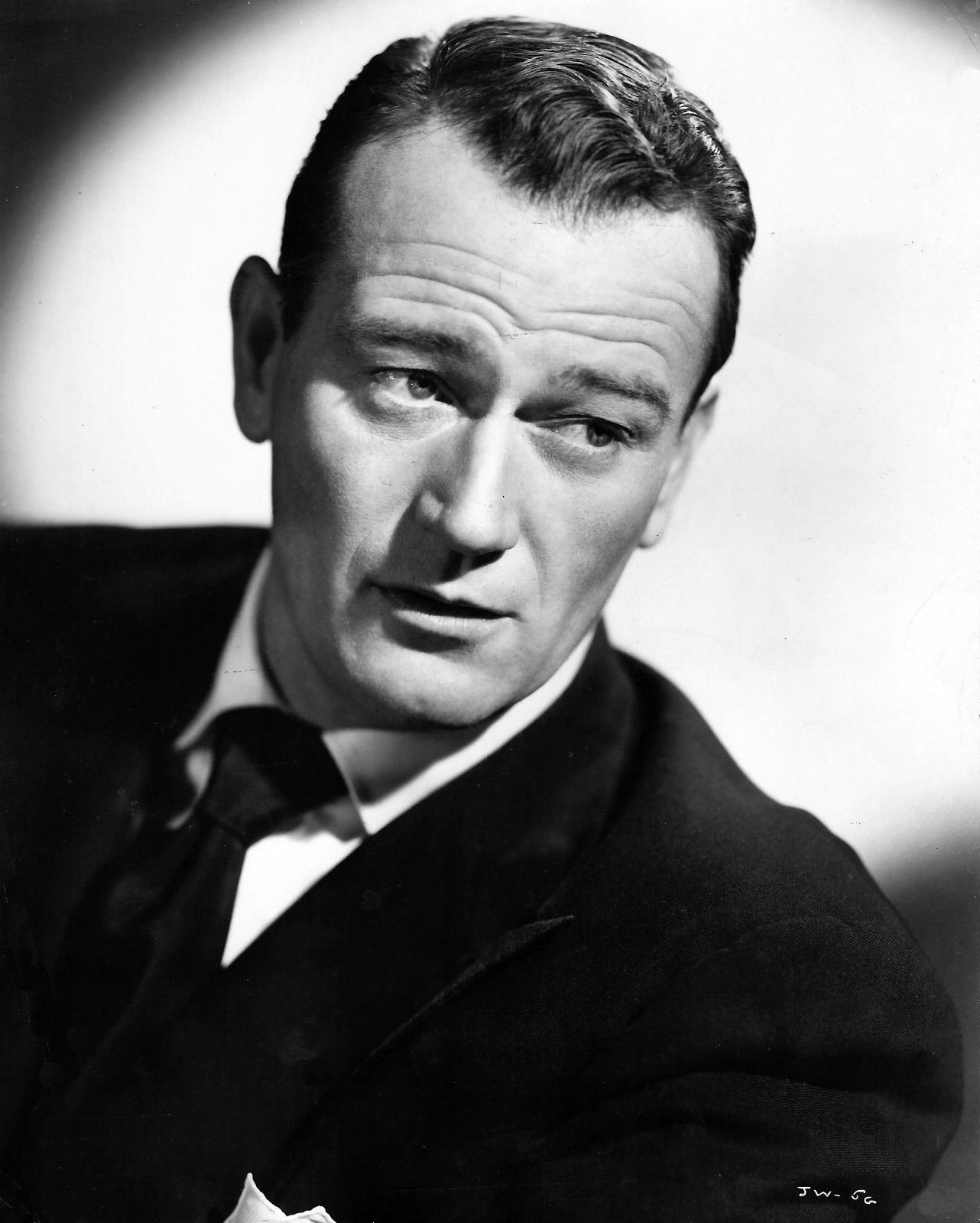
John Wayne 1952

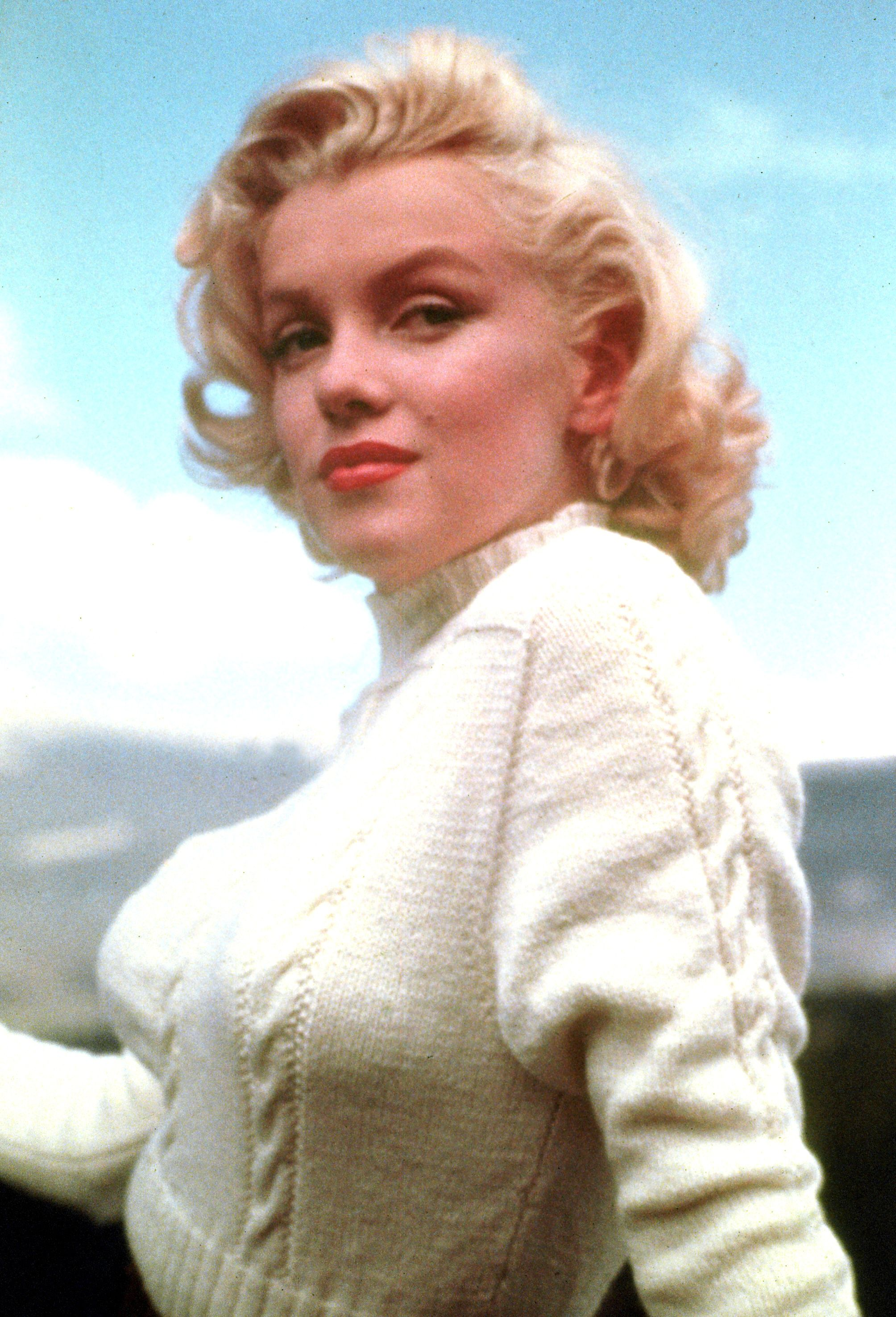
Marilyn Monroe 1953

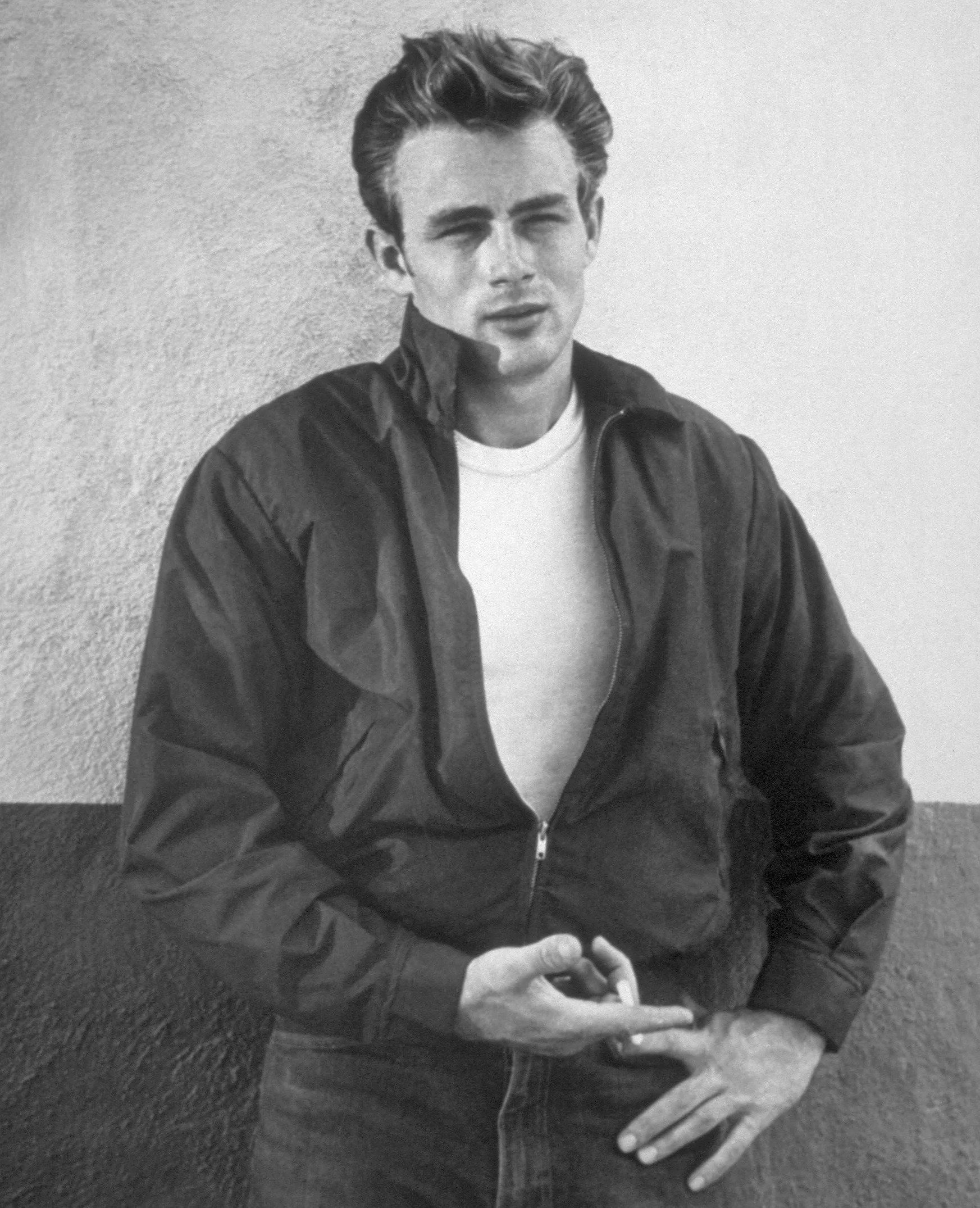
James Dean 1955

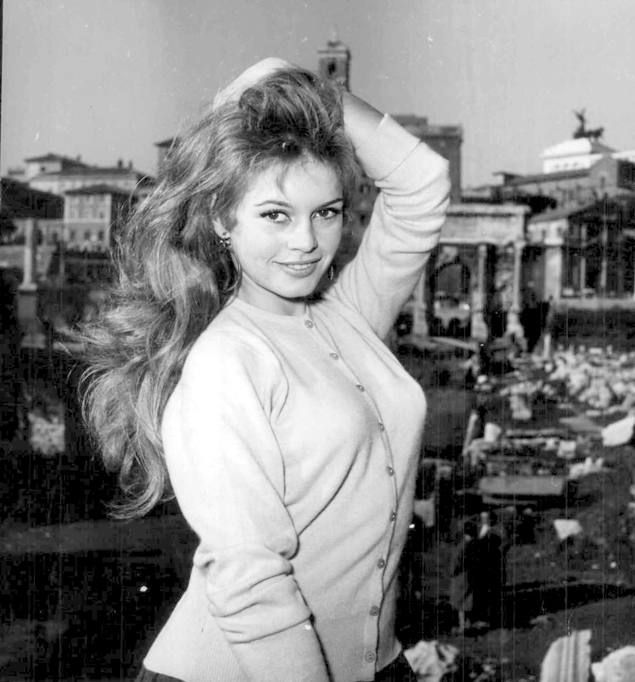
Brigitte Bardot 1957

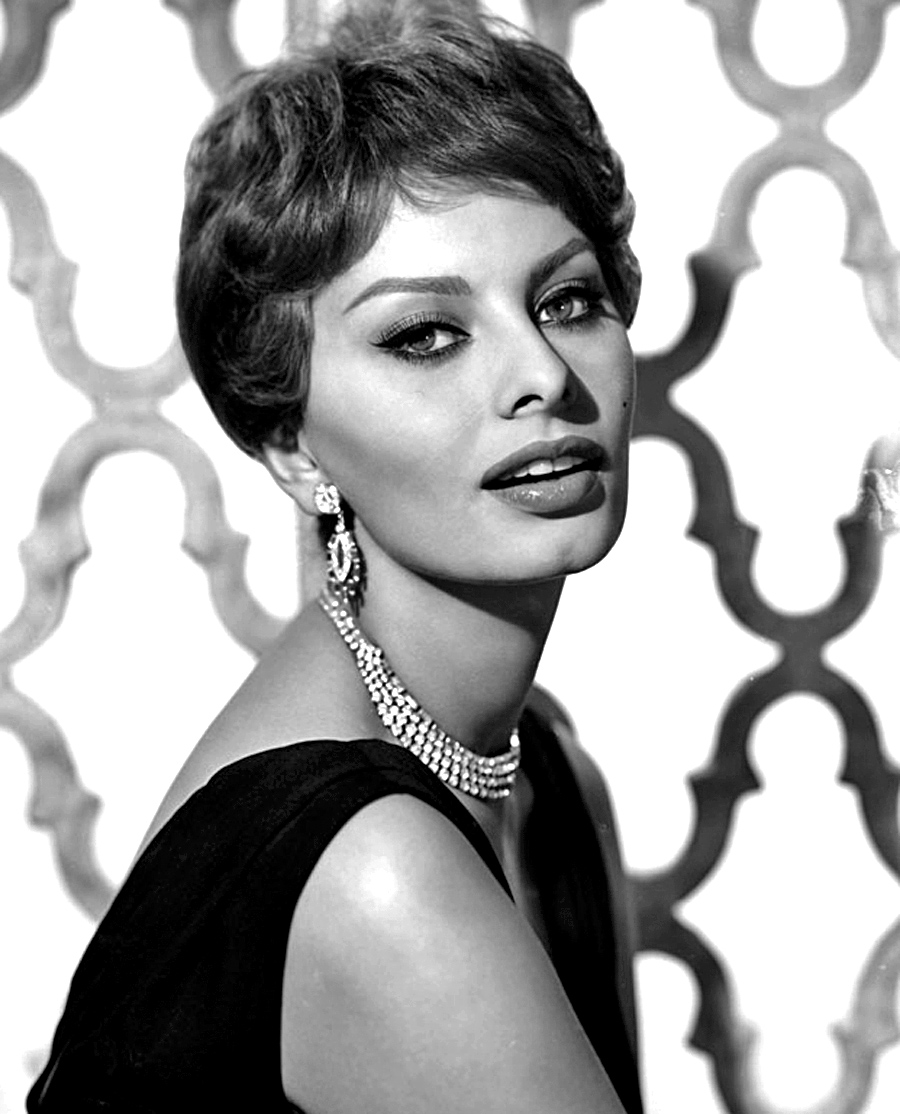
Sophia Loren 1959
- Abbott and Costello
- Joss Ackland
- Julie Adams
- Eddie Albert
- Jack Albertson
- Steve Allen
- June Allyson
- Dev Anand
- Desi Arnaz
- James Arness
- Edward Arnold
- Fred Astaire
- Gene Autry
- Richard Attenborough
- Lauren Bacall
- Carroll Baker
- Lucille Ball
- Martin Balsam
- Anne Bancroft
- Brigitte Bardot
- Richard Basehart
- Anne Baxter
- Kathryn Beaumont
- Harry Belafonte
- Jean-Paul Belmondo
- Jack Benny
- Milton Berle
- Ingrid Bergman
- Charles Bickford
- Vivian Blaine
- Robert Blake
- Ann Blyth
- Richard Boone
- Stephen Boyd
- Ray Bolger
- Dirk Bogarde
- Humphrey Bogart
- Ernest Borgnine
- Marlon Brando
- Walter Brennan
- Lloyd Bridges
- Charles Bronson
- Mel Brooks
- Lenny Bruce
- Yul Brynner
- Edgar Buchanan
- Richard Burton
- George Burns
- Raymond Burr
- Sid Caesar
- James Cagney
- Rory Calhoun
- Claudia Cardinale
- Yvonne De Carlo
- Leslie Caron
- Art Carney
- John Carradine
- Diahann Carroll
- Johnny Carson
- John Cassavetes
- Jeff Chandler
- Carol Channing
- Charlie Chaplin
- Cyd Charisse
- Lee Van Cleef
- Montgomery Clift
- Rosemary Clooney
- Lee J. Cobb
- Claudette Colbert
- Nat "King" Cole
- Joan Collins
- Sean Connery
- Gary Cooper
- William Conrad
- Mary Costa
- Joseph Cotten
- Jeanne Crain
- Joan Crawford
- Bing Crosby
- Tony Curtis
- Peter Cushing
- Robert Cummings
- Arlene Dahl
- Dorothy Dandridge
- Danielle Darrieux
- Linda Darnell
- Bette Davis
- Nancy Davis
- Sammy Davis Jr.
- Doris Day
- James Dean
- Ruby Dee
- Sandra Dee
- William Demarest
- Richard Denning
- Brandon deWilde
- Angie Dickinson
- Marlene Dietrich
- Troy Donahue
- Mamie Van Doren
- Diana Dors
- Bobby Driscoll
- Kirk Douglas
- Clint Eastwood
- Barbara Eden
- Anita Ekberg
- María Félix
- Verna Felton
- Mel Ferrer
- José Ferrer
- Peter Finch
- Barry Fitzgerald
- Rhonda Fleming
- Jo Van Fleet
- Errol Flynn
- Nina Foch
- Henry Fonda
- Joan Fontaine
- John Forsythe
- Glenn Ford
- Anne Francis
- William Frawley
- Annette Funicello
- Louis de Funès
- Clark Gable
- Eva Gabor
- Zsa Zsa Gabor
- Ava Gardner
- James Garner
- Judy Garland
- Vittorio Gassman
- John Gielgud
- Lillian Gish
- Jackie Gleason
- Paulette Goddard
- Betty Grable
- Gloria Grahame
- Cary Grant
- Farley Granger
- Stewart Granger
- Kathryn Grayson
- Lorne Greene
- John Gregson
- Virginia Grey
- Alec Guinness
- Edmund Gwenn
- Tony Hancock
- Julie Harris
- Rex Harrison
- Laurence Harvey
- Olivia de Havilland
- Jack Hawkins
- Sterling Hayden
- Helen Hayes
- Susan Hayward
- Rita Hayworth
- Van Heflin
- Audrey Hepburn
- Katharine Hepburn
- Haya Harareet
- Charlton Heston
- William Holden
- Judy Holliday
- Stanley Holloway
- Dennis Hopper
- Bob Hope
- Rock Hudson
- Jeffrey Hunter
- Tab Hunter
- Betty Hutton
- Burl Ives
- Pedro Infante
- John Ireland
- Anne Jeffreys
- Van Johnson
- Glynis Johns
- Carolyn Jones
- Jennifer Jones
- Shirley Jones
- Katy Jurado
- Boris Karloff
- Danny Kaye
- Howard Keel
- Brian Keith
- Gene Kelly
- Grace Kelly
- Deborah Kerr
- Eartha Kitt
- Jack Klugman
- Don Knotts
- Dilip Kumar
- Kishore Kumar
- Meena Kumari
- Alan Ladd
- Burt Lancaster
- Angela Lansbury
- Piper Laurie
- Peter Lawford
- Cloris Leachman
- Christopher Lee
- Ruta Lee
- Janet Leigh
- Jack Lemmon
- Jerry Lewis
- Norman Lloyd
- June Lockhart
- Gina Lollobrigida
- Julie London
- Sophia Loren
- Peter Lorre
- Jack Lord
- Ida Lupino
- Darren McGavin
- Gordon MacRae
- Fred MacMurray
- Shirley MacLaine
- Jayne Mansfield
- Karl Malden
- Dorothy Malone
- Jean Marais
- Fredric March
- Dean Martin
- Lee Marvin
- Groucho Marx
- Giulietta Masina
- James Mason
- Marcello Mastroianni
- Jerry Mathers
- Walter Matthau
- Victor Mature
- Virginia Mayo
- Joel McCrea
- Dorothy McGuire
- John McIntire
- Steve McQueen
- Audrey Meadows
- Jayne Meadows
- Ralph Meeker
- Adolphe Menjou
- Burgess Meredith
- Toshiro Mifune
- Ray Milland
- John Mills
- Vera Miles
- Sal Mineo
- Carmen Miranda
- Cameron Mitchell
- Robert Mitchum
- Marilyn Monroe
- Yves Montand
- Ricardo Montalbán
- Agnes Moorehead
- Elizabeth Montgomery
- Roger Moore
- Jeanne Moreau
- Rita Moreno
- Harry Morgan
- Vic Morrow
- Audie Murphy
- Don Murray
- Patricia Neal
- Jorge Negrete
- Ricky Nelson
- Paul Newman
- Barbara Nichols
- Leslie Nielsen
- David Niven
- Kim Novak
- Edmond O'Brien
- Donald O'Connor
- Maureen O'Hara
- Maureen O'Sullivan
- Laurence Olivier
- Geraldine Page
- Janis Paige
- Eleanor Parker
- Jack Palance
- Gregory Peck
- George Peppard
- Anthony Perkins
- Jean Peters
- Donald Pleasence
- Christopher Plummer
- Sidney Poitier
- Dick Powell
- Jane Powell
- Tyrone Power
- Elvis Presley
- Robert Preston
- Vincent Price
- Jon Provost
- Anthony Quinn
- Tony Randall
- Ronald Reagan
- Donna Reed
- George Reeves
- Steve Reeves
- Carl Reiner
- Tommy Rettig
- Debbie Reynolds
- Thelma Ritter
- Jason Robards
- Cliff Robertson
- Edward G. Robinson
- Ginger Rogers
- Roy Rogers
- Cesar Romero
- Mickey Rooney
- Barbara Rush
- Jane Russell
- Rosalind Russell
- Eva Marie Saint
- George Sanders
- John Saxon
- Maximilian Schell
- Romy Schneider
- Gordon Scott
- Lizabeth Scott
- Randolph Scott
- Jean Seberg
- Peter Sellers
- Omar Sharif
- Dinah Shore
- Takashi Shimura
- Vittorio De Sica
- Simone Signoret
- Jean Simmons
- Frank Sinatra
- Red Skelton
- Ann Sothern
- Alberto Sordi
- Robert Stack
- Kim Stanley
- Barbara Stanwyck
- Rod Steiger
- Jan Sterling
- James Stewart
- Dean Stockwell
- Lewis Stone
- Woody Strode
- Barry Sullivan
- Ed Sullivan
- Max von Sydow
- Lyle Talbot
- Russ Tamblyn
- Elizabeth Taylor
- Robert Taylor
- Rod Taylor
- Gene Tierney
- Spencer Tracy
- Lana Turner
- Vivian Vance
- Robert Wagner
- Eli Wallach
- John Wayne
- Jack Webb
- Orson Welles
- Betty White
- Stuart Whitman
- James Whitmore
- Richard Widmark
- Esther Williams
- Marie Windsor
- Shelley Winters
- Natalie Wood
- Joanne Woodward
- Teresa Wright
- Jane Wyman
- Keenan Wynn
- Loretta Young
- Robert Young
- Efrem Zimbalist Jr.

=== Filmmakers ===
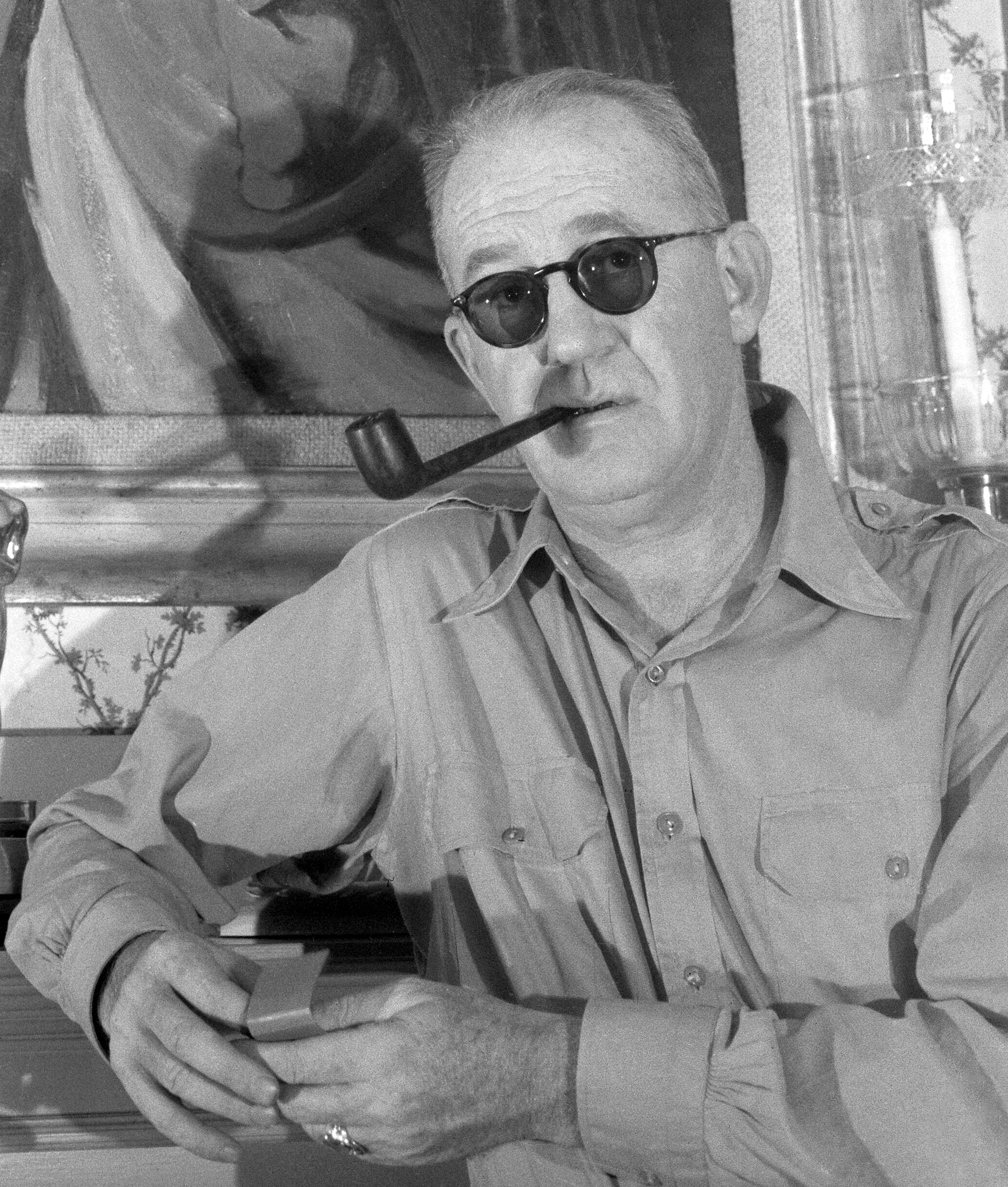
John Ford

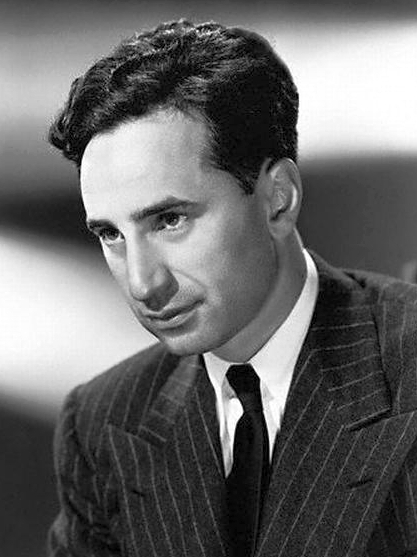
Elia Kazan

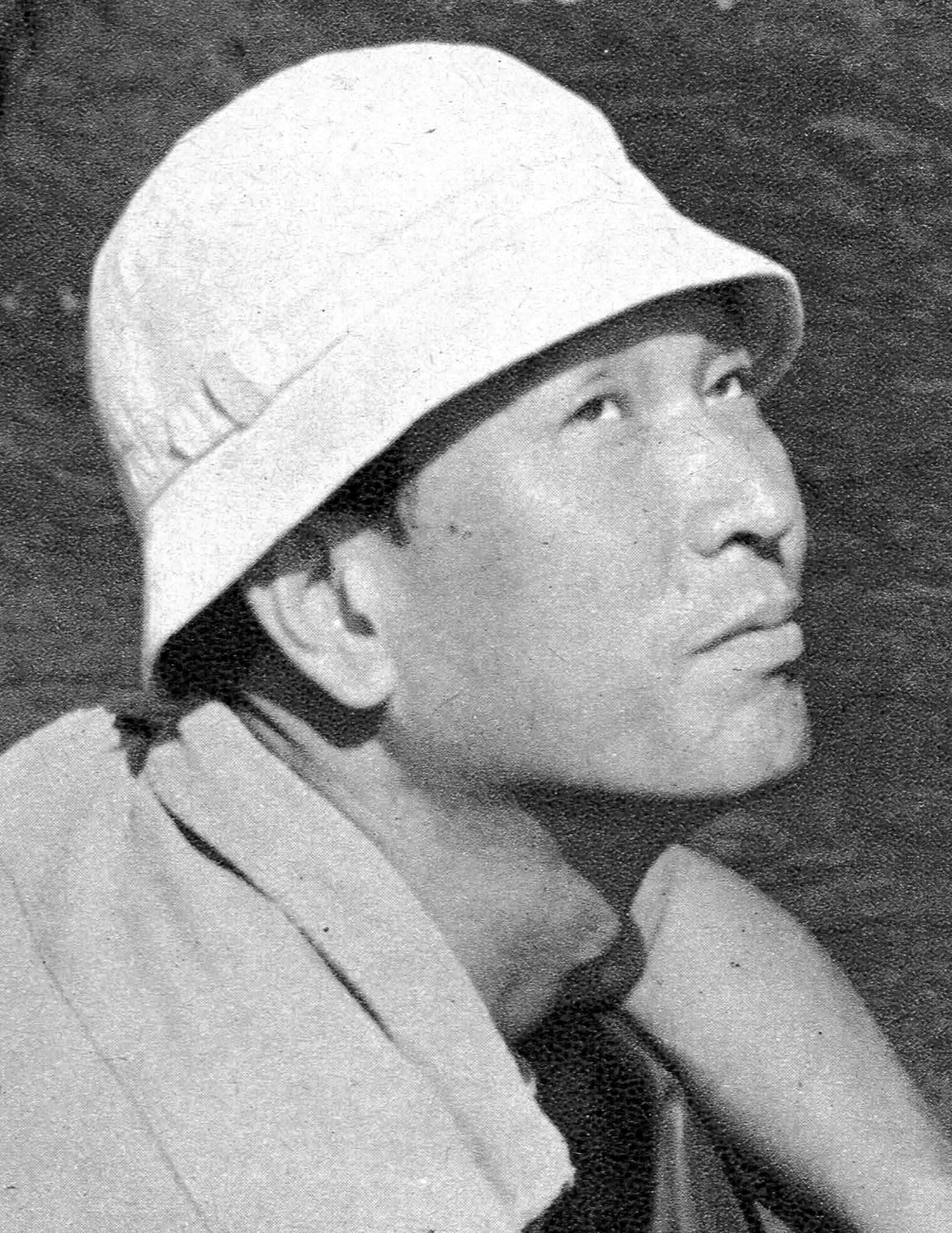
Akira Kurosawa

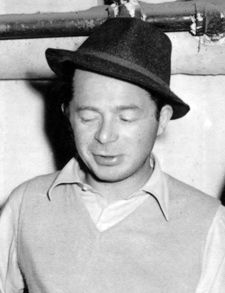
Billy Wilder
- Michelangelo Antonioni
- Mario Bava
- Ingmar Bergman
- Luis Buñuel
- Jean Cocteau
- Luigi Comencini
- Charles Crichton
- George Cukor
- Michael Curtiz
- Jean Delannoy
- Walt Disney
- Stanley Donen
- Blake Edwards
- Federico Fellini
- Richard Fleischer
- John Frankenheimer
- John Ford
- Lucio Fulci
- Pietro Germi
- Jean-Luc Godard
- Henry Hathaway
- Howard Hawks
- Alfred Hitchcock
- Howard Hughes
- John Huston
- Elia Kazan
- Keisuke Kinoshita
- Stanley Kubrick
- Akira Kurosawa
- Fritz Lang
- David Lean
- Anthony Mann
- Joseph L. Mankiewicz
- Jean-Pierre Melville
- Kenji Mizoguchi
- Mario Monicelli
- Yasujirō Ozu
- Otto Preminger
- Nicholas Ray
- Dino Risi
- Jacques Rivette
- Roberto Rossellini
- Vittorio De Sica
- Don Siegel
- J. Lee Thompson
- Andrzej Wajda
- Orson Welles
- Billy Wilder
- Robert Wise
- William Wyler

=== Musicians ===
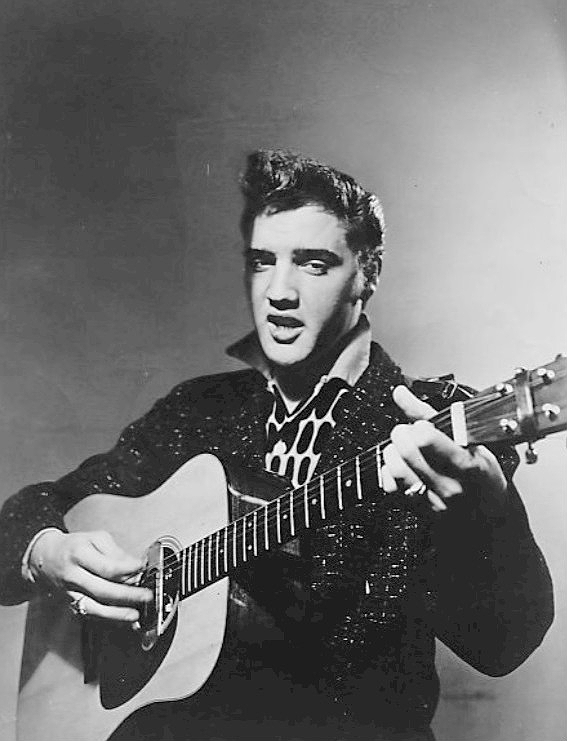
Elvis Presley 1956

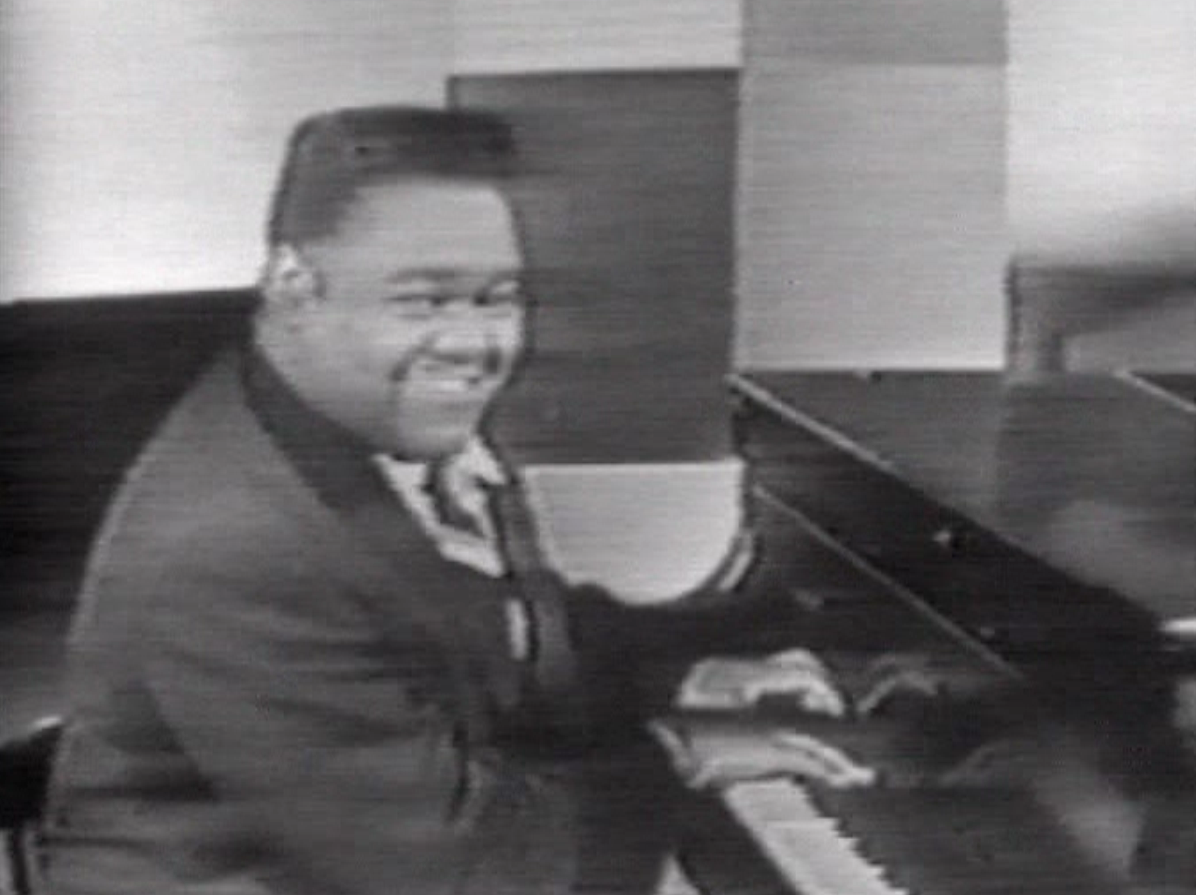
Fats Domino c. 1956

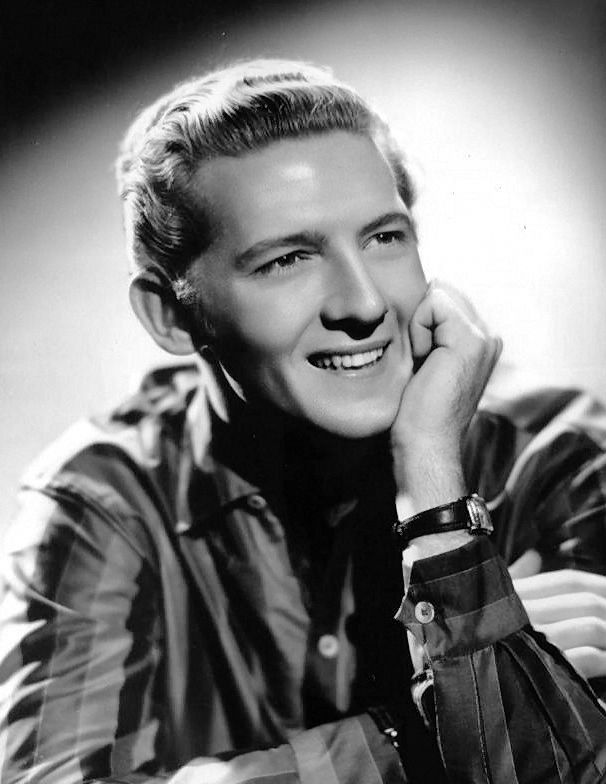
Jerry Lee Lewis c. 1957

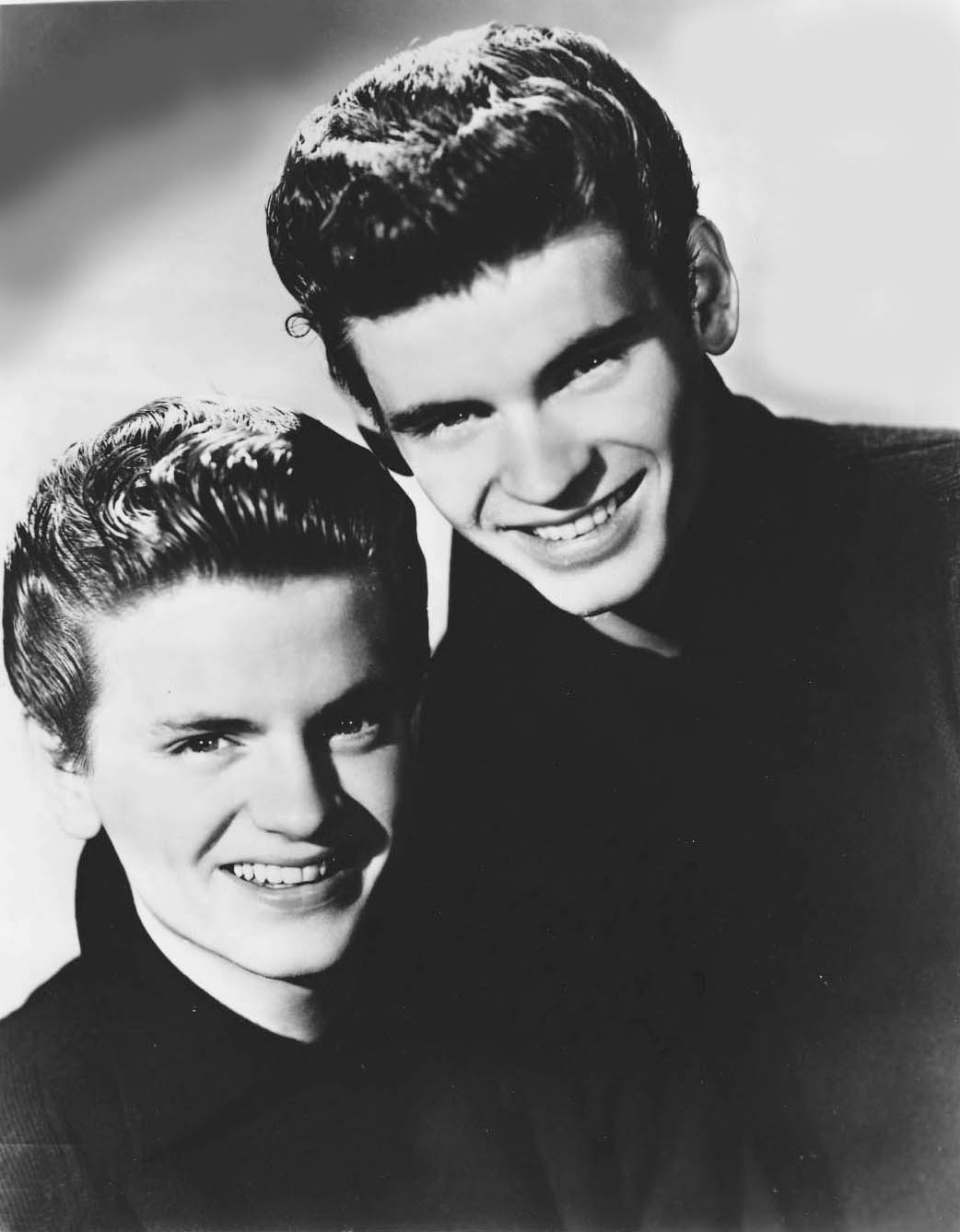
Everly Brothers c. 1958
- Black Ace
- Buddy Ace
- Johnny Ace
- Arthur Alexander
- Lee Allen
- Gene Allison
- Marian Anderson
- Pink Anderson
- Paul Anka
- Louis Armstrong
- Eddy Arnold
- Chet Atkins
- Gene Autry
- Frankie Avalon
- Charles Aznavour
- LaVern Baker
- Pearl Bailey
- Hank Ballard
- Bobby Bare
- Count Basie
- Sidney Bechet
- Harry Belafonte
- Jesse Belvin
- Tex Beneke
- Boyd Bennett
- Tony Bennett
- Chuck Berry
- Richard Berry
- Bill Black
- Otis Blackwell
- Scrapper Blackwell
- Blind Blake
- Art Blakey
- Bobby Bland
- Johnny Bond
- Pat Boone
- The Big Bopper
- Jimmy Bowen
- Calvin Boze
- Jackie Brenston
- Teresa Brewer
- Big Bill Broonzy
- Charles Brown
- Clarence "Gatemouth" Brown
- James Brown
- Nappy Brown
- Roy Brown
- Ruth Brown
- Tommy Brown
- Dave Brubeck
- Jimmy Bryant
- Sonny Burgess
- Solomon Burke
- Johnny Burnette
- James Burton
- Sam Butera
- Erskine Butterfield
- Maria Callas
- Cab Calloway
- Glen Campbell
- Martha Carson
- Goree Carter
- Johnny Cash
- Bobby Charles
- Ray Charles
- Boozoo Chavis
- Chubby Checker
- Clifton Chenier
- June Christy
- Eugene Church
- Dee Clark
- Petula Clark
- Joe Clay
- Jack Clement
- Patsy Cline
- Rosemary Clooney
- Eddie Cochran
- Nat "King" Cole
- John Coltrane
- Perry Como
- James Cotton
- Floyd Council
- Pee Wee Crayton
- Bing Crosby
- Bob Crosby
- Gary Crosby
- Arthur Crudup
- Mac Curtis
- Dick Dale
- Dick Dale (singer)
- Dalida
- Bobby Darin
- Hal David
- Jimmie Davis
- Miles Davis
- Sammy Davis Jr.
- Bobby Day
- Doris Day
- Bo Diddley
- Willie Dixon
- Carl Dobkins Jr.
- Bill Doggett
- Fats Domino
- Lonnie Donegan
- Jimmy Dorsey
- Lee Dorsey
- Tommy Dorsey
- K. C. Douglas
- Rusty Draper
- Champion Jack Dupree
- Jimmy Durante
- Leroy Van Dyke
- Jack Earls
- Duke Ellington
- Billy "The Kid" Emerson
- Werly Fairburn
- Charlie Feathers
- H-Bomb Ferguson
- Eddie Fisher
- Sonny Fisher
- Toni Fisher
- Ella Fitzgerald
- Mary Ford
- Tennessee Ernie Ford
- Helen Forrest
- Connie Francis
- Alan Freed
- Ernie Freeman
- Frank Frost
- Johnny Fuller
- Billy Fury
- Earl Gaines
- Hank Garland
- Judy Garland
- Clarence Garlow
- Georgia Gibbs
- Dizzy Gillespie
- Dick Glasser
- Arthur Godfrey
- Benny Goodman
- Roscoe Gordon
- Eydie Gormé
- Charlie Gracie
- Gogi Grant
- Jack Guthrie
- Roy Hamilton
- Lionel Hampton
- Pat Hare
- Slim Harpo
- Homer Harris
- Peppermint Harris
- Wynonie Harris
- Hawkshaw Hawkins
- Screamin' Jay Hawkins
- Al Hibbler
- Chuck Higgins
- Earl Hines
- Silas Hogan
- Smokey Hogg
- Ron Holden
- Billie Holiday
- Buddy Holly
- John Lee Hooker
- Lightnin' Hopkins
- Lena Horne
- Johnny Horton
- David Houston
- Joe Houston
- Ivory Joe Hunter
- Tab Hunter
- Betty Hutton
- Burl Ives
- Bull Moose Jackson
- Mahalia Jackson
- Elmore James
- Etta James
- Harry James
- Homesick James
- Joni James
- Sonny James
- Waylon Jennings
- Kris Jensen
- Dr. John
- Little Willie John
- Hank Jones
- Jimmy Jones
- Louis Jordan
- Don Julian
- Kitty Kallen
- Chris Kenner
- Anita Kerr
- Albert King
- B.B. King
- Ben E. King
- Earl King
- Freddie King
- Pee Wee King
- Saunders King
- Eartha Kitt
- Christine Kittrell
- Baker Knight
- Sonny Knight
- Buddy Knox
- Gene Krupa
- Frankie Laine
- Major Lance
- Mario Lanza
- Ellis Larkins
- Brenda Lee
- Dickie Lee
- Peggy Lee
- Lazy Lester
- Jerry Lee Lewis
- Smiley Lewis
- Little Willie Littlefield
- Julie London
- Joe Hill Louis
- Willie Love
- Robin Luke
- Frankie Lymon
- Loretta Lynn
- Carl Mann
- Dean Martin
- Grady Martin
- Janis Martin
- Johnny Mathis
- Jimmy McCracklin
- Skeets McDonald
- Big Jay McNeely
- Clyde McPhatter
- Max Merritt
- Big Maceo Merriweather
- Amos Milburn
- Chuck Miller
- Mitch Miller
- Ned Miller
- Roy Milton
- Garnet Mimms
- Charles Mingus
- Carmen Miranda
- Bobby Mitchell
- Guy Mitchell
- Thelonious Monk
- Bill Monroe
- Vaughn Monroe
- Wes Montgomery
- Benny Moré
- Moon Mullican
- Rose Murphy
- Jimmy Nelson
- Ricky Nelson
- Sandy Nelson
- Robert Nighthawk
- Willie Nix
- Jimmy Nolen
- Nervous Norvus
- Donald O'Conner
- St. Louis Jimmy Oden
- Odetta
- Gene O'Quin
- Roy Orbison
- Johnny Otis
- Patti Page
- Charlie Parker
- Junior Parker
- Dolly Parton
- Les Paul
- Art Pepper
- Carl Perkins
- Oscar Peterson
- Phil Phillips
- Sam Phillips
- Édith Piaf
- Webb Pierce
- Gene Pitney
- Pérez Prado
- Elvis Presley
- Jimmy Preston
- Johnny Preston
- Lloyd Price
- Ray Price
- Louis Prima
- Johnnie Ray
- Tampa Red
- Jerry Reed
- Jimmy Reed
- Della Reese
- Django Reinhardt
- Slim Rhodes
- Buddy Rich
- Charlie Rich
- Cliff Richard
- Little Richard
- Tommy Ridgley
- Billy Lee Riley
- Tex Ritter
- Johnny Rivers
- Max Roach
- Marty Robbins
- Jimmie Rodgers
- Arsenio Rodríguez
- Kenny Rogers
- Bobby Rydell
- Kyu Sakamoto
- Washboard Sam
- Tommy Sands
- Mabel Scott
- Neil Sedaka
- Pete Seeger
- Johnny Shines
- Dinah Shore
- Frank Sinatra
- Memphis Slim
- Sunnyland Slim
- Huey "Piano" Smith
- Ray Smith
- Warren Smith
- Hank Snow
- Kay Starr
- Joan Sutherland
- Art Tatum
- Jesse Thomas
- Rufus Thomas
- Hank Thompson
- Big Mama Thornton
- Johnny Tillotson
- Merle Travis
- Ernest Tubb
- Big Joe Turner
- Ike Turner
- Sammy Turner
- Conway Twitty
- Ritchie Valens
- Sarah Vaughan
- Bobby Vee
- Gene Vincent
- T-Bone Walker
- Little Walter
- Mercy Dee Walton
- Baby Boy Warren
- Dinah Washington
- Muddy Waters
- Johnny "Guitar" Watson
- Joe Weaver
- Ben Webster
- Lenny Welch
- Speedy West
- Josh White
- Slim Whitman
- Andy Williams
- Big Joe Williams
- Cootie Williams
- Hank Williams
- Larry Williams
- Otis Williams
- Tex Williams
- Ralph Willis
- Bob Wills
- Howlin' Wolf
- Malcolm Yelvington
- Faron Young
- Johnny "Man" Young
- Timi Yuro

=== Bands ===
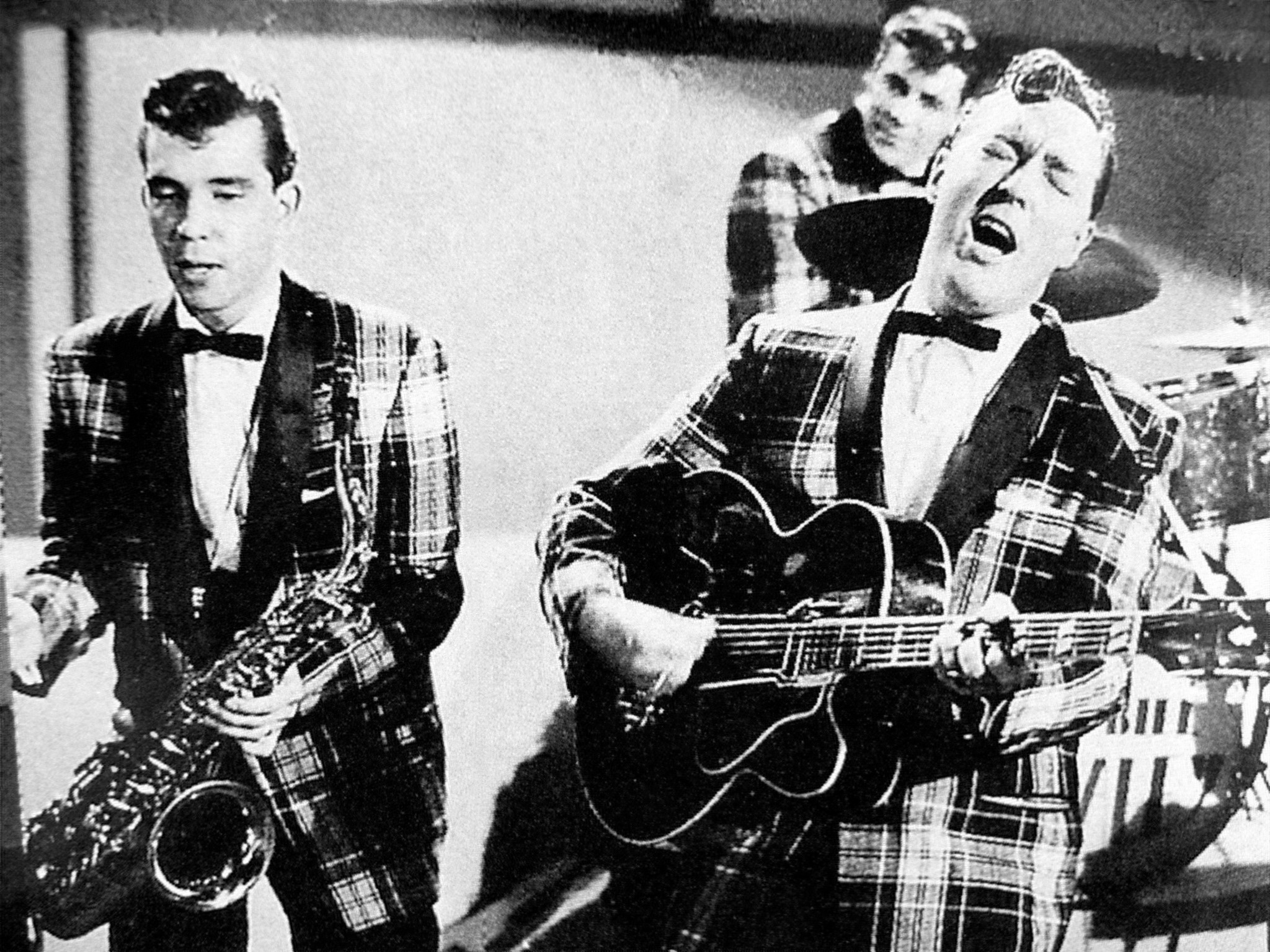
Bill Haley & His Comets c. 1954

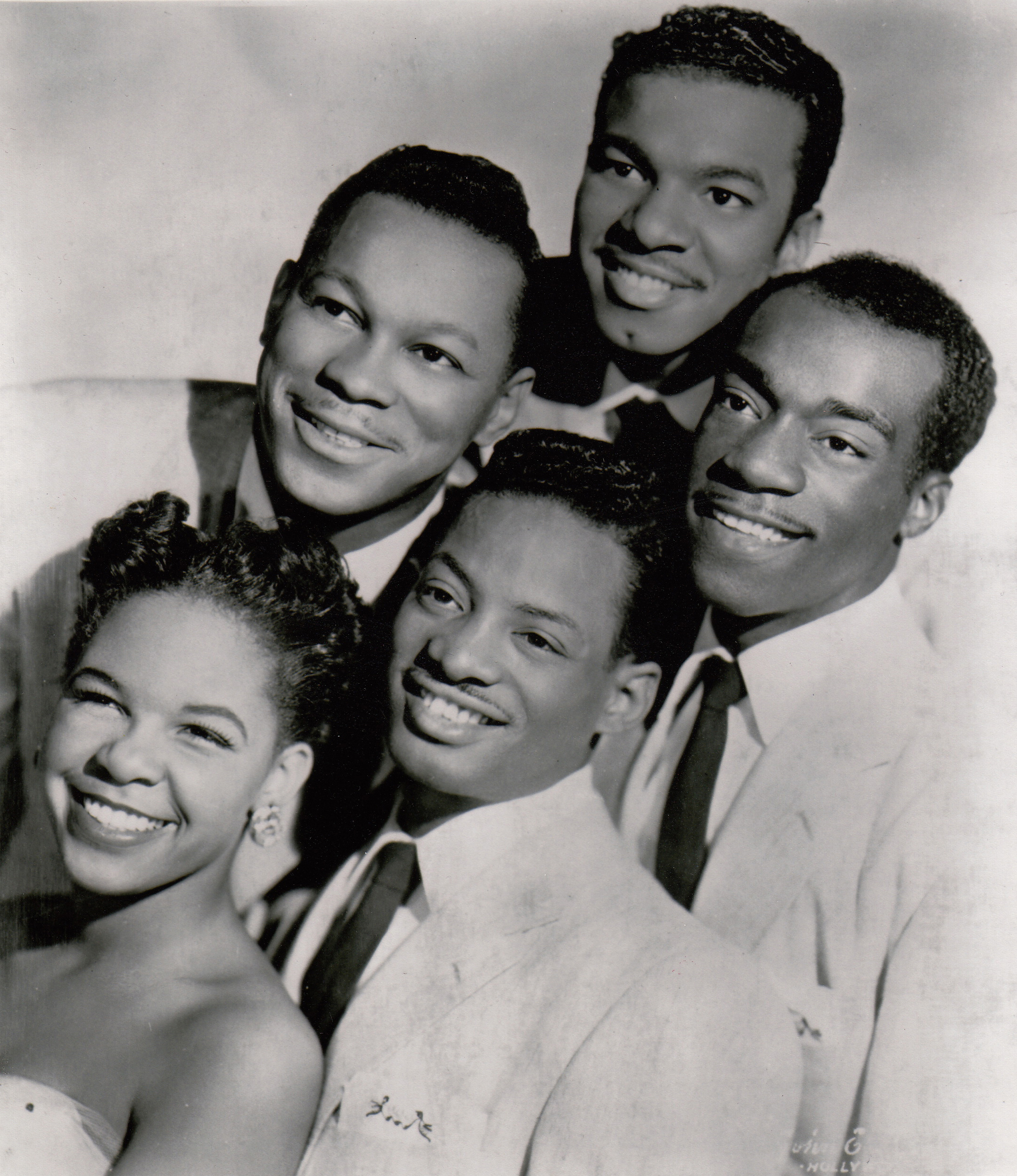
The Platters 1955

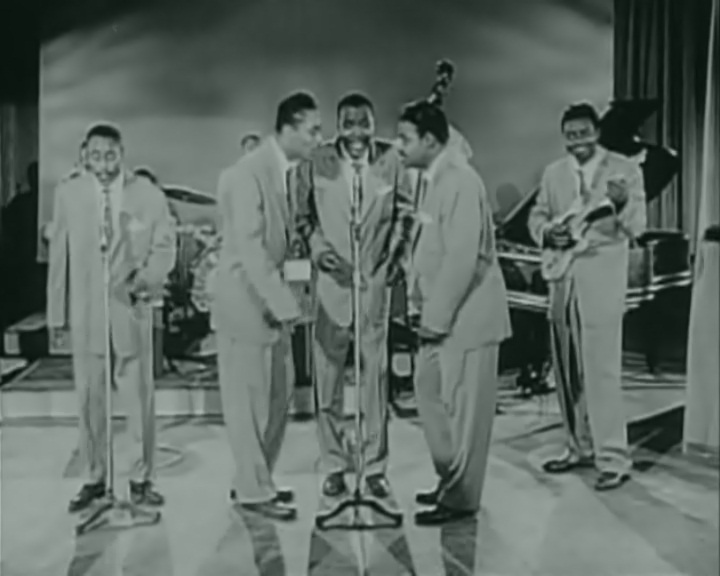
The Clovers 1955

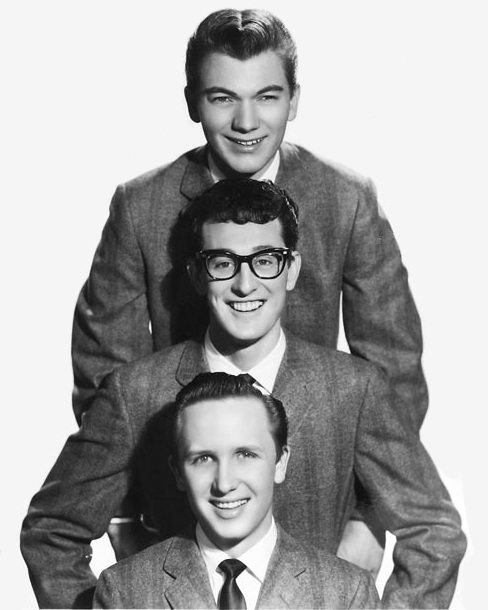
Buddy Holly & The Crickets 1958
- The Accents
- Jay & The Americans
- The Ames Brothers
- The Andrews Sisters
- Dave Appell & the Applejacks
- The Bell Notes
- The Belmonts
- Dion & The Belmonts
- Travis & Bob
- The Bobbettes
- The Bonnie Sisters
- The Bosstones
- The Buchanan Brothers
- The Cadets
- The Cadillacs
- The Capris
- The Cardinals
- The Castells
- The Champs
- The Chantels
- The Charioteers
- Otis Williams and the Charms
- The Chimes
- The Chips
- The Chordettes
- The Cleftones
- The Clovers
- The Coasters
- The Collegians
- Bill Haley and the Comets
- The Corsairs
- The Counts
- The Crew Cuts
- The Crescendos
- The Crests
- The Crows
- Danny & the Juniors
- Jan & Dean
- The Dells
- The Del-Satins
- The Delta Rhythm Boys
- The Del-Vikings
- Deep River Boys
- The Dovells
- The Dubs
- The Duprees
- The Diamonds
- The Drifters
- The Earls
- The Echoes
- The Edsels
- The El Dorados
- The Elegants
- The Emotions
- The Escorts
- The Everly Brothers
- The Fairfield Four
- The Falcons
- The Flamingos
- The Flairs
- The Fleetwoods
- The Fiestas
- The Five Satins
- The Five Discs
- The Five Keys
- The Five Sharps
- The Fontane Sisters
- The Four Aces
- The Four Buddies
- The Four Freshmen
- The Four Knights
- The Four Lads
- The Four Lovers
- The Four Preps
- The Four Seasons
- The Four Tunes
- The Gaylords
- The G-Clefs
- The Golden Gate Quartet
- The Harptones
- The Hearts
- The Heathertones
- The Hilltoppers
- The Hollywood Flames
- Johnny & The Hurricanes
- The Impalas
- Little Anthony and the Imperials
- The Ink Spots
- The Isley Brothers
- The Jewels
- The Jesters
- The Jive Bombers
- The Jive Five
- Marvin & Johnny
- Robert & Johnny
- Don & Juan
- The Jubalaires
- The Jordanaires
- The Kingston Trio
- The Knockouts
- The Larks
- The Lettermen
- Frankie Lymon & The Teenagers
- The McGuire Sisters
- The Medallions
- The Mello-Kings
- The Mello-Moods
- The Mills Brothers
- The Midnighters
- The Monotones
- The Moonglows
- The Mystics
- The Nutmegs
- The Oak Ridge Boys
- The Orioles
- The Paragons
- The Penguins
- The Pied Pipers
- The Platters
- The Pony-Tails
- The Quarrymen
- The Quotations
- Randy & The Rainbows
- The Ravens
- The Rays
- The Regents
- The Righteous Brothers
- Norman Fox & The Rob-Roys
- The Robins
- The Rock-A-Teens
- The Sensations
- The Shadows
- The Shepherd Sisters
- The Silhouettes
- The Solitaires
- Sons of The Pioneers
- The Spaniels
- The Sparkletones
- The Spiders
- The Spinners
- Joey Dee & The Starliters
- The Stereos
- The Swallows
- Mickey & Sylvia
- Tátrai Quartet
- The Teenagers
- The Teen Queens
- The Tokens
- The Tornados
- The Turbans
- The Tymes
- The Valentines
- The Ventures
- The Virtues
- The Volumes
- Billy Ward & The Dominoes
- The Wrens
- Maurice Williams and the Zodiacs
- Windsbacher Knabenchor

=== Sports figures ===
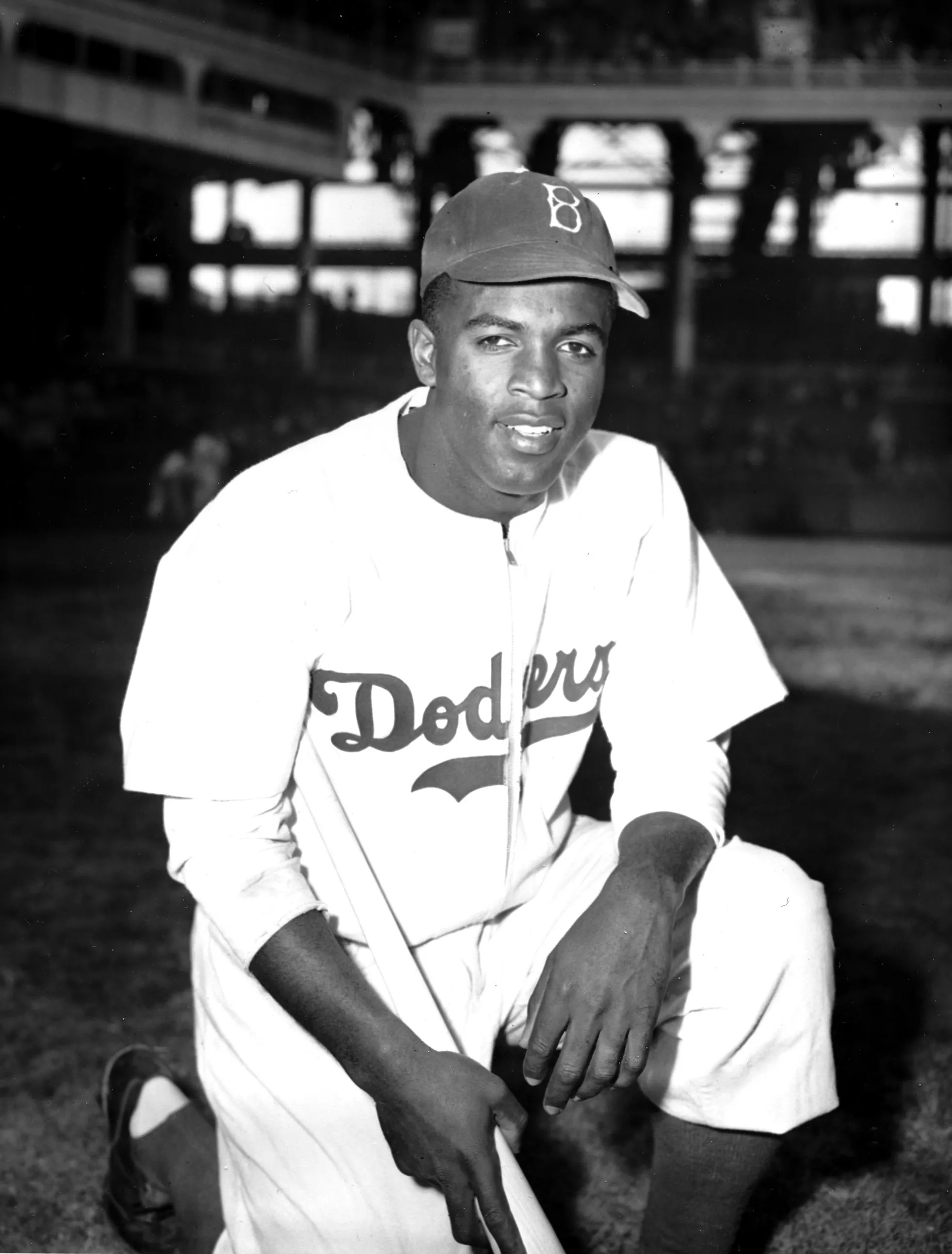
Jackie Robinson

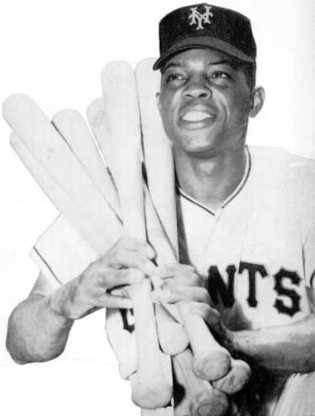
Willie Mays

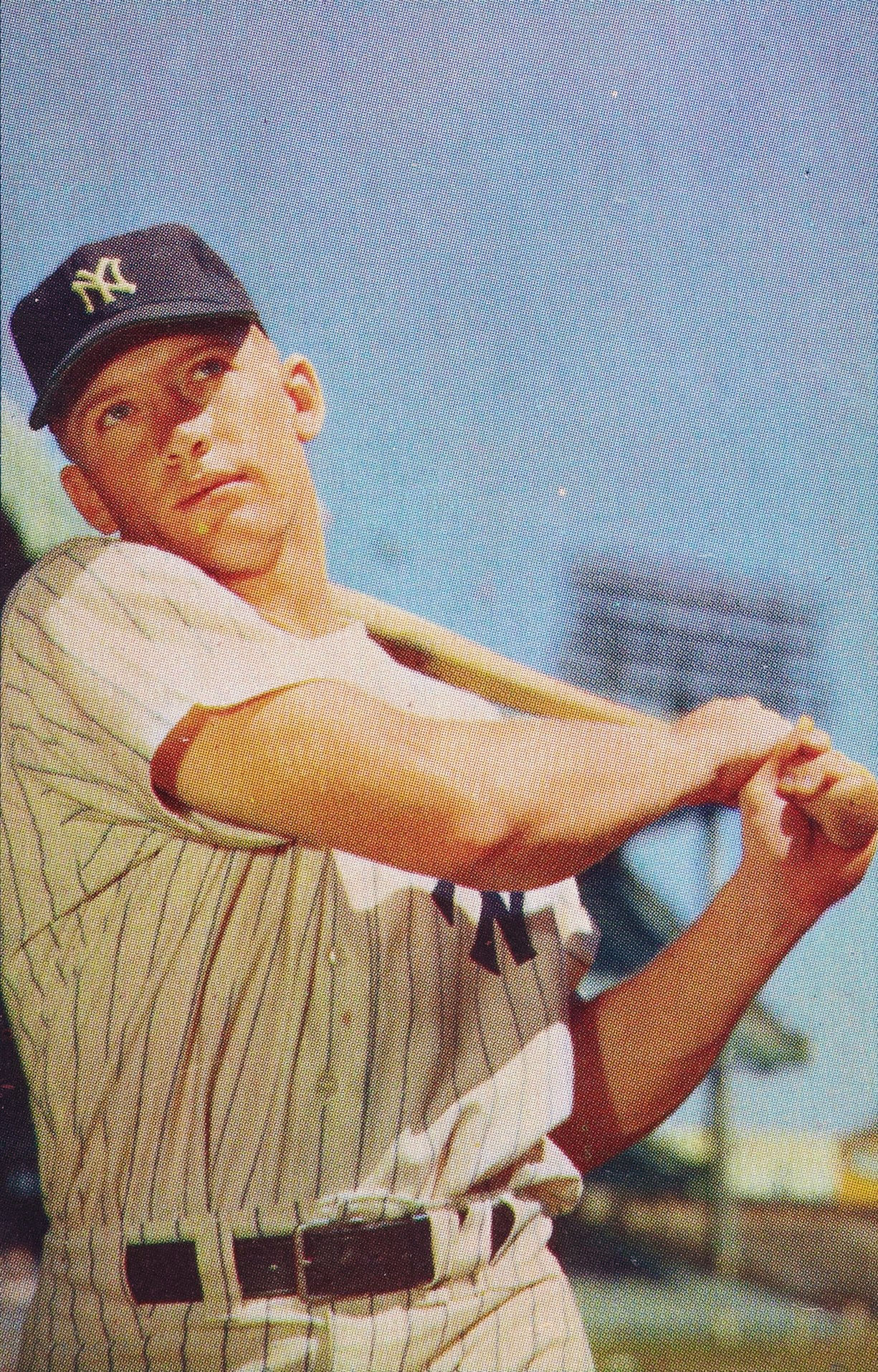
Mickey Mantle

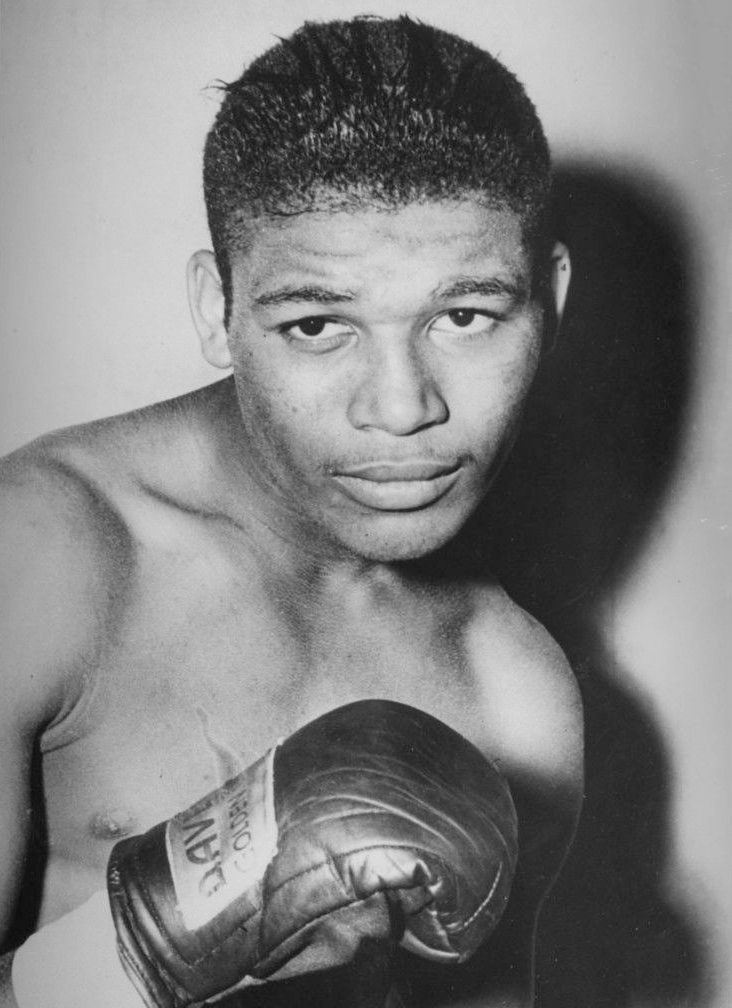
Sugar Ray Robinson
- Hank Aaron (baseball player)
- Alberto Ascari (motor racing driver)
- Ernie Banks (baseball player)
- Roger Bannister (English track and field athlete)
- Carmen Basilio (boxing|boxer)
- Jean Behra (motor racing driver)
- Yogi Berra (baseball player)
- Jo Bonnier (motor racing driver)
- József Bozsik
- Tony Brooks (motor racing driver)
- Jim Brown (American football player)
- László Budai
- Jenő Buzánszky
- Roy Campanella (baseball player)
- Ezzard Charles (boxer)
- Peter Collins (motor racing driver)
- Maureen Connolly (tennis player)
- Bob Cousy (basketball player)
- Zoltán Czibor
- Joe DiMaggio (baseball player)
- Harrison Dillard (American track and field athlete)
- Larry Doby (baseball player)
- Juan Manuel Fangio (motor racing driver)
- Nino Farina (motor racing driver)
- Just Fontaine (Association footballer)
- Whitey Ford (baseball player)
- Gyula Grosics
- Jose Froilan Gonzalez (motor racing driver)
- Mike Hawthorn (motor racing driver)
- Nándor Hidegkuti
- Ben Hogan (golf)
- Gordie Howe (Canadian ice hockey player)
- Rafer Johnson (American track and field athlete)
- Ingemar Johansson (boxer)
- Al Kaline (baseball player)
- Sándor Kocsis
- Raymond Kopa (Association footballer)
- John Landy (Australian track and field athlete)
- Hermann Lang (motor racing driver)
- Mihály Lantos
- Gyula Lóránt
- Mickey Mantle (baseball player)
- Rocky Marciano (boxer)
- Billy Martin (baseball player)
- Eddie Mathews (baseball player)
- Stanley Matthews (association footballer)
- Willie Mays (baseball player)
- George Mikan (basketball player)
- Stirling Moss (motor racing driver)
- Archie Moore (boxer)
- Ivan Mrazek (basketball player)
- Stan Musial (baseball player)
- Bobo Olson (boxer)
- Floyd Patterson (boxer)
- Pelé (association footballer)
- Bob Pettit
- Alfonso de Portago (motor racing driver)
- Ferenc Puskás (association footballer)
- Maurice Richard (Canadian ice hockey player)
- Jackie Robinson (baseball player)
- Frank Robinson (baseball player)
- Sugar Ray Robinson (boxer)
- Wilma Rudolph
- Bill Russell (basketball player)
- Sam Snead (golf)
- Duke Snider (baseball player)
- Warren Spahn (baseball player)
- Casey Stengel (baseball manager, former player)
- Chuck Taylor
- Johnny Unitas (American football player)
- Mal Whitfield (American track and field athlete)
- Ted Williams (baseball player)
- Billy Wright (association footballer)
- Lev Yashin (association footballer)
- József Zakariás
- Emil Zátopek

== See also ==
- List of decades, centuries, and millennia
- 1950s in television
- List of years in literature § 1950s
- Post–World War II economic expansion

=== Timeline ===
The following articles contain brief timelines which list the most prominent events of the decade:

1950 • 1951 • 1952 • 1953 • 1954 • 1955 • 1956 • 1957 • 1958 • 1959
