= List of 1980s deaths in popular music =

The following is a list of notable performers of rock and roll music or rock music, and others directly associated with the music as producers, songwriters or in other closely related roles, who have died in the 1980s. The list gives their date, cause and location of death, and their age.

Rock music developed from the rock and roll music that emerged during the 1950s, and includes a diverse range of subgenres. The terms "rock and roll" and "rock" each have a variety of definitions, some narrow and some wider. In determining criteria for inclusion, this list uses as its basis reliable sources listing "rock deaths" or "deaths in rock and roll", as well as such sources as the Rock and Roll Hall of Fame.

Preceded by 1970s	List of deaths in popular music 1980s	Succeeded by 1990s

== 1980 ==
Name	Age	Date	Location	Cause of death
Jim Michaelson; Little Bill and the Bluenotes	25	1980		Unknown
Wally Scott; Ray Columbus & The Invaders	30	January , 1980	New Zealand	Cancer
Amos Milburn	52	January 3, 1980	Houston, Texas, U.S.	Complications from a stroke
Georgeanna Tillman; The Marvelettes	35	January 6, 1980	Inkster, Michigan, U.S.	Complications from sickle cell anemia and lupus
Larry Williams	44	January 7, 1980	Los Angeles, California, U.S.	Suicide by gunshot
Carl White; The Rivingtons	47	January 7, 1980	Los Angeles, California, U.S.	Acute tonsillitis
Vic McAlpin	61	January 19, 1980	Nashville, Tennessee, U.S.	Unknown
Piero Ciampi	45	January 19, 1980	Rome, Italy	Throat cancer
Professor Longhair	61	January 23, 1980	New Orleans, Louisiana, U.S.	Heart attack
Seab Meador; The Gentlemen	30	January 24, 1980	Tyler, Texas, U.S.	Brain cancer
Jimmy Durante	86	January 29, 1980	Santa Monica, California, U.S.	Pneumonia
Edward Lewis; Record producer for Decca Records	79	January 29, 1980	Chelsea, London, England	Cancer
Warren Smith	47	January 30, 1980	Longview, Texas, U.S.	Heart attack
Les Prior; Alberto y Lost Trios Paranoias	31	January 31, 1980	Manchester, England	Leukemia
Bon Scott; AC/DC, The Valentines	33	February 19, 1980	Dulwich, London, England	Alcohol poisoning, heroin overdose
Janet Vogel; The Skyliners	38	February 21, 1980	Pittsburgh, Pennsylvania, United States	Suicide by carbon monoxide
Dick Kallman	46	February 28, 1980	Manhattan, New York, U.S.	Killed by stabbing wound
Jacob Miller; Inner Circle	27	March 23, 1980	Kingston, Jamaica	Traffic accident
John Poulos; The Buckinghams	32	March 26, 1980	Chicago, Illinois, U.S.	Heart failure
Ricky Lancelotti	35	April 7, 1980	Los Angeles, California, U.S.	Overdose
Anna Jantar	29	April 14, 1980	Warsaw, Poland	"Mikolaj Kopernik" plane crash
Tommy Caldwell; The Marshall Tucker Band	30	April 28, 1980	Spartanburg, South Carolina, U.S.	Traffic collision
Ian Curtis; Joy Division	23	May 18, 1980	Macclesfield, England	Suicide by hanging
Carl Radle; Derek and the Dominos, Eric Clapton	37	May 30, 1980	Claremore, Oklahoma, U.S.	Kidney infection
Charles Miller; War	41	June 14, 1980	Los Angeles, California, U.S.	Stabbing
Bert Kaempfert	56	June 21, 1980	Mallorca, Spain	Stroke
Barney Bigard	74	June 27, 1980	Culver City, California, U.S.	
Malcolm Owen; The Ruts	26	July 14, 1980	London, England	Heroin overdose
Keith Godchaux; The Grateful Dead	32	July 23, 1980	Marin County, California, U.S.	Traffic accident
Mohammed Rafi	55	July 31, 1980	Bombay, Maharashtra, India	Heart attack
Duke Pearson	47	August 4, 1980	Atlanta, Georgia, U.S.	Multiple sclerosis
George Scott III	26	August 5, 1980	New York City, New York, U.S.	Heroin overdose
Joe Dassin	41	August 20, 1980	Papeete, Tahiti, French Polynesia	Heart attack
Jimmy Forrest	60	August 26, 1980	Grand Rapids, Michigan, U.S.	Heart failure
Bill Evans	51	September 15, 1980	New York City, New York, U.S.	Peptic ulcer
Per Ivar Johansen; Alex Band	27	September 19, 1980	Oslo, Norway	Tour bus crash
John Bonham; Led Zeppelin	32	September 25, 1980	Windsor, England	Asphyxiation on vomit
Pat Hare	49	September 26, 1980	Saint Paul, Minnesota, U.S.	Lung cancer
Lincoln Chase	54	October 6, 1980	Metro Atlanta, U.S.	Unknown
Bobby Lester; The Moonglows	49	October 6, 1980	Louisville, Kentucky, U.S.	Lung cancer
Steve Peregrin Took; T. Rex, Shagrat, Steve Took's Horns	31	October 27, 1980	Ladbroke Grove, London, England	Asphyxiation
O. V. Wright	41	November 16, 1980	Mobile, Alabama, U.S.	Heart attack
Darby Crash; Germs	22	December 7, 1980	Los Angeles, California, U.S.	Suicide by heroin overdose
John Lennon; The Beatles, Plastic Ono Band	40	December 8, 1980	New York City, New York, U.S.	Murder
Louis Neefs	43	December 25, 1980	Lier, Belgium	Road accident
Tim Hardin	39	December 29, 1980	Los Angeles, California, U.S.	Heroin overdose
Robert Pete Williams	66	December 31, 1980	Rosedale, Louisiana, U.S.	Unknown

== 1981 ==
Name	Age	Date	Location	Cause of death
David Lynch; The Platters	52	January 2, 1981	Long Beach, California, United States	Cancer
Felton Jarvis	46	January 3, 1981	Nashville, Tennessee, U.S.	Stroke
Alice Mae Buschmann Spielvogel; The Chordettes	55	January 6, 1981	North Little Rock, Pulaski County, Arkansas, U.S.	
Cozy Cole	71	January 9, 1981	Columbus, Ohio, U.S.	Cancer
Blind James Campbell	74	January 22, 1981	Nashville, Tennessee, U.S.	Unknown
Carl Feaster; The Chords	50	January 23, 1981	New York City, New York, U.S.	Cancer
John Persh; Rare Earth (band)	38	January 27, 1981	Detroit, Michigan, United States	Staph infection
Bill Haley; Bill Haley & His Comets	55	February 9, 1981	Harlingen, Texas, U.S.	Brain tumor or heart attack
Mike Bloomfield; The Paul Butterfield Blues Band	37	February 15, 1981	San Francisco, California, U.S.	Accidental drug overdose
Ty Hunter; The Originals	40	February 24, 1981	Los Angeles, California, U.S.	Lung cancer
Little Hat Jones	81	March 7, 1981	Naples, Texas, U.S.	Unknown
Tampa Red	77	March 19, 1981	Chicago, Illinois, U.S.	Unknown
Bob Hite; Canned Heat	38	April 5, 1981	Los Angeles, California, U.S.	Heart attack caused by heroin overdose
Kit Lambert	45	April 7, 1981	Middlesex, England	Cerebral hemorrhage after fall down stairs
Austin Pitre	63	April 8, 1981	Elton, Louisiana, U.S.	Unknown
Steve Currie; T. Rex	33	April 28, 1981	Vale de Parra, Algarve, Portugal	Traffic accident
Tracy Weber	21	May 1981	Harlem, New York City, U.S.	Murder by gunshot
Bob Marley; The Wailers	36	May 11, 1981	Miami, Florida, U.S.	Acral lentiginous melanoma
Ernie Freeman	58	May 16, 1981	Los Angeles, California, U.S.	Heart attack
Roy Brown	55	May 25, 1981	San Fernando, California, U.S.	Heart attack
Mary Lou Williams	71	May 28, 1981	Atlanta, Georgia, U.S.	Bladder cancer
Rino Gaetano Italian singer-songwriter	30	June 2, 1981	Rome, Italy	Road accident on Via Nomentana
Joseph Santollo; The Duprees	37	June 4, 1981	Jersey City, New Jersey, United States	Heart attack
Polka Dot Slim	54	June 22, 1981	Oakland, California, U.S.	Unknown
Chuck Wagon; The Dickies	24	June 28, 1981	San Fernando Valley, Los Angeles, California, U.S.	Suicide by gunshot
Rushton Moreve; Steppenwolf	32	July 1, 1981	Los Angeles, California, U.S.	Traffic accident
Hubert Johnson; The Contours	40	July 11, 1981	Detroit, Michigan, U.S.	Suicide by poison and gunshot
Harry Chapin	38	July 16, 1981	Jericho, New York, U.S.	Heart attack / Traffic accident
Stefania Rotolo Italian dancer and showgirl	30	July 31, 1981	Rome, Italy	Long illness
Mario Abbate Italian singer and actor	53	August 6, 1981	Naples, Italy	
Guy Stevens; Record producer and band manager from Hapshash and the Coloured Coat, Mott the Hoople, Procol Harum and The Clash	38	August 28, 1981	South London, England	Prescription drug overdose
Helen Humes	68	September 13, 1981	Santa Monica, California, U.S.	Cancer
Furry Lewis	88	September 14, 1981	Memphis, Tennessee, U.S.	Heart failure
Hazel Scott	61	October 2, 1981	Mount Sinai Hospital, Manhattan, New York, U.S.	Pancreatic cancer
Jud Strunk	45	October 5, 1981	Carrabassett Valley, Maine, U.S.	Plane crash
George de Fretes	59	November 19, 1981	Los Angeles County, California, U.S.	
Big Walter Horton	60	December 8, 1981	Chicago, Illinois, U.S.	Heart failure
Pigmeat Markham	77	December 13, 1981	The Bronx, New York, U.S.	Stroke

== 1982 ==
Name	Age	Date	Location	Cause of death
Remo Bartolomei Italian singer and bassist	34	1982	Rome, Italy	
Estella Blain French actress and singer	51	January 1, 1982	Port-Vendres, France	
David Záizar	53	January 2, 1982	Mexico City, Mexico	Non-traumatic cardiac arrest
Tommy Bryant	51	January 3, 1982		Unknown
Elis Regina	36	January 19, 1982	São Paulo, Brazil	Drug overdose
Tommy Tucker	48	January 22, 1982	Newark, New Jersey, U.S.	Food poisoning
Lightnin' Hopkins	69	January 30, 1982	Houston, Texas, U.S.	Esophageal cancer
Alex Harvey; Sensational Alex Harvey Band	46	February 4, 1982	Zeebrugge, Belgium	Heart attack
Thelonious Monk	64	February 17, 1982	Englewood, New Jersey, U.S.	
John Belushi; The Blues Brothers	33	March 5, 1982	Los Angeles, California, U.S.	Speedball overdose
Leonid Osipovič Utësov Singer and conductor	86	March 9, 1982	Moscow, Soviet Union	
Sam George; The Capitols	39	March 17, 1982		Stabbed to death
Randy Rhoads; Quiet Riot, Ozzy Osbourne	25	March 19, 1982	Leesburg, Florida, U.S.	Plane accident
King Pleasure	58	March 21, 1982	Los Angeles, California, U.S.	Heart attack
Floyd Smith	65	March 29, 1982	Indianapolis, Indiana, U.S.	Unknown
Ann Richards	46	April 1, 1982	Los Angeles, California, U.S.	Suicide by gunshot
Lester Bangs music journalist	33	April 30, 1982	New York City, New York, U.S.	Opioid, diazepam, and NyQuil overdose
Cal Tjader	56	May 5, 1982	Manila, Philippines	Heart attack
Neil Bogart; Record producer for Kiss and music executive from Casablanca Records	39	May 8, 1982	Los Angeles, California, U.S.	Cancer
Monk Montgomery	60	May 20, 1982	Las Vegas, Nevada, U.S.	Cancer
Rusty Day; The Amboy Dukes	36	June 3, 1982	Longwood, Florida, U.S.	Murder
Addie Harris; The Shirelles	42	June 10, 1982	Atlanta, Georgia, U.S.	Heart attack
Art Pepper	56	June 15, 1982	Los Angeles. California, U.S.	Stroke
James Honeyman-Scott; The Pretenders	25	June 16, 1982	London, England	Cocaine overdose
Warren Ryanes; The Monotones	45	June 16, 1982	Newark, New Jersey, United States	Unknown
Jane Vasey; Downchild Blues Band	32	July 6, 1982	Toronto, Canada	Leukemia
Bill Justis	55	July 15, 1982	Nashville, Tennessee, U.S.	Cancer
Sonny Stitt	58	July 22, 1982	Washington, D.C., U.S.	Heart attack
Keith Green	28	July 28, 1982	Garden Valley, Texas, U.S.	Plane crash
Nick Lucas	84	July 28, 1982	Colorado Springs, Colorado, U.S.	Double pneumonia
Kurt Feltz	72	August 2, 1982	Pollença, Spain	
Ñico Saquito Cuban musician and guitarist	81	August 4, 1982	Santiago de Cuba, Cuba	Heart failure
Ferré Grignard Belgian singer and songwriter	43	August 8, 1982	Antwerp, Belgium	
Joe Tex	47	August 13, 1982	Navasota, Texas, U.S.	Heart attack
Riccardo Rauchi Italian saxophonist, singer and composer	62	August 22, 1982	San Benedetto del Tronto, Ascoli Piceno, Italy	
Luciana Dolliver Italian singer	72	September 1, 1982	Rome, Italy	
Doyle Wilburn; The Wilburn Brothers	52	September 27, 1982	Nashville, Tennessee, U.S.	Lung cancer
Bob Lynch; The Dubliners	47	October 2, 1982	Dublin, Ireland	Suicide
Glenn Gould	50	October 4, 1982	Toronto, Ontario, Canada	Stroke
Sias Reynecke; South African Pop singer and member of Groep 2	42	October 8, 1982	Amersfoort, Mpumalanga, South Africa	Unknown
Radka Toneff	30	October 21, 1982	Oslo, Norway	Suicide by drug overdose
Hoyt Hawkins; The Jordanaires	54	October 23, 1982	Nashville, Davidson County, Tennessee, U.S.	Heart attack
Patrick Cowley	32	November 12, 1982	San Francisco, California, U.S.	HIV/AIDS
Al Haig	60	November 16, 1982	New York City, New York, U.S.	Heart attack
Byron "Arkie" Benedict; Arkie & His Jolly Cowboys	72	November 22, 1982	West Salem, Oregon, U.S.	Unknown
David Blue	41	December 2, 1982	New York City, New York, U.S.	Heart attack
Tommy Cogbill	50	December 7, 1982	Nashville, Tennessee, U.S.	Stroke
Dave Torbert; Kingfish, New Riders of the Purple Sage	34	December 7, 1982	Butte City, California, U.S.	Heart attack
Marty Robbins	57	December 8, 1982	Nashville, Tennessee, U.S.	Heart attack
Lazy Bill Lucas	64	December 11, 1982	Minneapolis, Minnesota, U.S.	Natural causes
Big Joe Williams	79	December 17, 1982	Macon, Mississippi, U.S.	

== 1983 ==
Name	Age	Date	Location	Cause of death
Agnese Dubbini Italian actress and opera singer	75	January 1, 1983	Rome, Italy	
Rebop Kwaku Baah; Traffic, Can	38	January 12, 1983	Stockholm, Sweden	Cerebral hemorrhage
Lamar Williams; The Allman Brothers Band	34	January 21, 1983	Los Angeles, California, U.S.	Lung cancer
Billy Fury	42	January 28, 1983	London, England	Heart attack
Lorraine Ellison	51	January 31, 1983	Philadelphia, Pennsylvania, U.S.	Ovarian cancer
Sam Chatmon	86	February 2, 1983	Hollandale, Mississippi, U.S.	Unknown
Karen Carpenter; The Carpenters	32	February 4, 1983	Downey, California, U.S.	Heart attack due to anorexia
Dig Richards	42	February 17, 1983	Sydney, Australia	Pancreatic cancer
Cliff Trenier; The Treniers	63	March 2, 1983	Las Vegas, Nevada, United States	Cancer
Peter Ivers	36	March 3, 1983	Los Angeles, California, U.S.	Murdered
William Walton	80	March 8, 1983	La Mortella, Ischia, Italy	Natural causes
Nasri Shamseddine	55	March 18, 1983	Damascus, Syria	Cardiac arrest on stage (after earlier heart attack)
Danny Rapp; Danny & The Juniors	41	April 5, 1983	Parker, Arizona, U.S.	Suicide by gunshot
Pete Farndon; The Pretenders	30	April 14, 1983	London, England	Drowning after heroin overdose
Felix Pappalardi; Mountain	43	April 17, 1983	New York City, New York, U.S.	Murdered by his wife Gail Collins Pappalardi
Earl Hines	79	April 22, 1983	Oakland, California, U.S.	Heart attack
Muddy Waters	70	April 30, 1983	Westmont, Illinois, U.S.	Heart attack
Clarence Quick; The Del-Vikings	46	May 5, 1983	Brooklyn, New York, United States	Heart attack
Eduardo Benavente; Alaska y los Pegamoides; Parálisis Permanente	20	May 14, 1983	Alfaro, La Rioja, Spain	Car accident
Stan Rogers	33	June 2, 1983	Hebron, Kentucky, U.S.	Was onboard Air Canada Flight 797
J. B. Hutto	57	June 12, 1983	Harvey, Illinois, U.S.	Cancer
Douglas "Buzz" Shearman; Moxy	32	June 16, 1983	Toronto, Canada	Motorcycle accident
Walter Jackson	45	June 20, 1983	Chicago, Illinois, U.S.	Cerebral hemorrhage
Larry Darnell	54	July 3, 1983	Columbus, Ohio, U.S.	Lung cancer
Cinico Angelini Italian conductor and arranger	81	July 7, 1983	Rome, Italy	
Chris Wood; Traffic	39	July 12, 1983	Birmingham, England	Pneumonia
Roosevelt Sykes	77	July 17, 1983	New Orleans, Louisiana, U.S.	Heart attack
Frank Fenter; Record producer and music industry executive of Atlantic Records and Capricorn Records	47	July 21, 1983	Macon, Georgia, U.S.	Heart attack
Jimmy Liggins	64	July 21, 1983	Durham, North Carolina, U.S.	Unknown
Wild Bill Moore	65	August 1, 1983	Los Angeles, California, U.S.	Unknown
James Jamerson; The Funk Brothers	47	August 2, 1983	Los Angeles, California, U.S.	Complications of cirrhosis, heart failure and pneumonia
Jobriath	36	August 3, 1983	Manhattan, New York City, U.S.	AIDS
Klaus Nomi	39	August 6, 1983	New York City, New York, U.S.	Complications due to AIDS
Ira Gershwin	86	August 17, 1983	Beverly Hills, California, U.S.	Cardiovascular disease
Sandra Tilley; The Velvelettes, Martha and the Vandellas	35 or 36	September 9, 1983	Las Vegas, Nevada U.S.	Brian aneurysm
Willie Bobo	49	September 15, 1983	Los Angeles, California, U.S.	Cancer
Roy Milton	76	September 18, 1983	Los Angeles, California, U.S.	
George "Harmonica" Smith	59	October 2, 1983	Los Angeles, California, U.S.	Unknown
Hugh Mundell	21	October 14, 1983	Kingston, Jamaica	Murder by gunshot
Merle Travis	65	October 20, 1983	Tahlequah, Oklahoma, U.S.	Heart attack
Keith Barrow	29	October 23, 1983	Chicago, Illinois, U.S.	AIDS-related complications
James Booker	43	November 8, 1983	New Orleans, Louisiana, U.S.	Renal failure related to chronic abuse of heroin and alcohol
John Grimaldi; Argent, Flux, Cheap Flights	28	November 15, 1983	Hertfordshire, England	Multiple sclerosis
Tom Evans; Badfinger	36	November 19, 1983	London, England	Suicide by hanging
Lucienne Boyer	82	December 6, 1983	Paris, France	Stroke
Gene Bricker; The Marcels	45	December 10, 1983	Pittsburgh, Pennsylvania, United States	Unknown
Harry Miller; South African jazz musician and member of Centipede, Amalgam, Dudu Pukwana & Spear, Elton Dean's Ninesense, Friendship Next Of Kin, Ovary Lodge, Chris McGregor's Brotherhood Of Breath	42	December 16, 1983	Amsterdam, Netherlands	Car accident
Jimmy Nolen	49	December 18, 1983	Atlanta, Georgia, U.S.	Heart attack
Dennis Wilson; The Beach Boys	39	December 28, 1983	Marina del Rey, California, U.S.	Accidental drowning

== 1984 ==
Name	Age	Date	Location	Cause of death
Zakes Mchunu; Member of The Soul Brothers	35	1984	South Africa	Car accident
Yvonne de Casa Fuerte French violinist and founder of the musical society La Sérénade	89	1984	Marseille, France	
Alexis Korner	55	January 1, 1984	Westminster, London	Lung cancer
Giulia De Mutiis Italian singer and lyricist	46	January 19, 1984	Sesto Calende, Italy	
Jackie Wilson; Billy Ward and his Dominoes	49	January 21, 1984	Mount Holly, New Jersey, U.S.	Pneumonia
Patrizio Esposito Italian singer and actor	24	January 27, 1984	Naples, Italy	Drug overdose
Al Dexter	78	January 28, 1984	Lewisville, Texas, U.S.	Heart attack
Ethel Merman	76	February 15, 1984	Manhattan, New York City, New York, U.S.	Brain cancer
Paul Gardiner; Tubeway Army, Gary Numan	25	February 18, 1984	Northolt, Middlesex, England	Heroin overdose
Joey Vann; The Duprees	40	February 28, 1984	Englewood, Bergen County, New Jersey, U.S.	Heart attack
Günter Hoffmann; Hoffmann & Hoffmann	32	March 15, 1984	Rio de Janeiro, Brazil	Suicide by jumping
Tom Jans	36	March 25, 1984	Los Angeles. California, U.S.	Drug overdose
Marvin Gaye	44	April 1, 1984	Los Angeles, California, U.S.	Murdered by his father
Ral Donner	41	April 6, 1984	Chicago, Illinois, U.S.	Lung cancer
Machito	74	April 15, 1984	London, England, U.K.	Complications from a stroke
Víctor Balaguer	63	April 17, 1984	Barcelona, Spain	Colorectal cancer
Red Garland	60	April 23, 1984	Dallas, Texas, U.S.	Heart attack
Count Basie	79	April 26, 1984	Hollywood, Florida, U.S.	Pancreatic cancer
Z. Z. Hill	48	April 27, 1984	Dallas, Texas, U.S.	Heart attack
Moses "Whispering" Smith	52	April 28, 1984	Baton Rouge, Louisiana, U.S.	Unknown
Gordon Jenkins	73	May 12, 1984	Malibu, California, U.S.	Lou Gehrig's disease
Nate Nelson; The Flamingos	52	June 1, 1984	Boston, Massachusetts, U.S.	Heart attack
Meredith Willson	82	June 15, 1984	Santa Monica, California, U.S.	Heart failure
Harmonica Slim	49	June 16, 1984	Texarkana, Texas, U.S.	Unknown
Guy McDonough	28	June 26, 1984	Melbourne, Australia	Pneumonia
Louis (Blues Boy) Jones	53	June 27, 1984	Galveston, Texas, U.S.	Unknown
Jimmie Spheeris	34	July 4, 1984	Santa Monica, California, United States	Motorcycle accident
Philippé Wynne; The Spinners	43	July 14, 1984	Oakland, California, U.S.	Heart attack
Big Mama Thornton	57	July 25, 1984	Los Angeles, California, U.S.	Heart attack
Ann Christy	38	August 7, 1984	Jette, Belgium	Cervical cancer
Esther Phillips	48	August 7, 1984	Carson, California, U.S.	Liver and kidney failure due to long-term drug abuse
Percy Mayfield	63	August 11, 1984	Los Angeles, California, U.S.	Heart attack
Lenny Breau	43	August 12, 1984	Los Angeles, California, U.S.	Murder by strangulation
Bobo Jenkins	68	August 14, 1984	Detroit, Michigan, U.S.	Unknown
Hammie Nixon	76	August 17, 1984	Jackson, Tennessee, U.S.	Unknown
Trummy Young	72	September 10, 1984	San Jose, California, U.S.	Cerebral hemorrhage
Titus Turner	51	September 13, 1984	Atlanta, Georgia, U.S.	Unknown
Steve Goodman	36	September 20, 1984	Seattle, Washington, U.S.	Leukemia
Shelly Manne	64	September 26, 1984	Los Angeles, California, U.S.	Heart attack
Geater Davis	38	September 29, 1984	Dallas, Texas, U.S.	Heart attack
Teddy Reig; Record producer, record company executive and co-founded of Roost Records	65	September 29, 1984	Teaneck, New Jersey, U.S.	Unknown
Alberta Hunter	89	October 17, 1984	Roosevelt Island, Manhattan, U.S.	Unknown
Buddy Moss	70	October 19, 1984	Atlanta, Georgia, U.S.	Unknown (possibly related to health issues)
Wells Kelly; Orleans	34	October 29, 1984	London, England	Morphine and cocaine overdose
Keith Hudson	38	November 14, 1984	New York, U.S.	Lung cancer
Razzle; Hanoi Rocks	24	December 8, 1984	Redondo Beach, California, U.S.	Car accident
Mal Spooner; Demon	39	December 10, 1984	Leek, Staffordshire, England	Pneumonia
Ron Tabak; Prism	31	December 25, 1984	Vancouver, British Columbia, Canada	Brain blood clot
Eddie "Bongo" Brown; The Funk Brothers	52	December 28, 1984	Los Angeles, California, U.S.	Heart ailment

== 1985 ==
Name	Age	Date	Location	Cause of death
Roberto "Rocky" Rossi Italian progressive rock musician (leader of the band Rocky's Filj)		1985		Car accident
Paola Musiani	35	January 8, 1985	Bologna, Italy	
Paul Hewson; Dragon	32	January 9 or 10, 1985	Henderson, Auckland, New Zealand	Accidental drug overdose
Anton Karas	78	January 10, 1985	Vienna, Austria	Unknown
Georgie Stoll; Musical director from Metro-Goldwyn Mayer	79	January 18, 1985	Monterey, California, U.S.	Pneumonia
Prince Tui Teka; Maori Volcanics Showband	47	January 23, 1985	Ruawai, Northland, New Zealand	Heart attack
Kenny Clarke	71	January 26, 1985	Montreuil, France	Heart attack
Dennis Parker	38	January 28, 1985	New York City, New York, U.S.	AIDS
Armand "Jump" Jackson	67	January 31, 1985	Chicago, Illinois, U.S.	
Matt Monro	54	February 7, 1985	Cromwell Hospital, London, England, UK	Liver cancer
David Byron; Uriah Heep	38	February 28, 1985	Reading, Berkshire, England	Alcohol-related liver failure
Robert Blackwell; Record producer and arranger	66	March 9, 1985	Hacienda Heights, Whittier, California, U.S.	Pneumonia
Bob Shad; Record producer for Big Brother and the Holding Company	65	March 13, 1985	Beverly Hills, California, U.S.	Heart attack
Annette Hanshaw	83	March 13, 1985	New York City, U.S.	Cancer
Bongi Makeba; Singer-songwriter and only daughter of Miriam Makeba	34	March 17, 1985	Conakry, Guinea	Complications from childbirth
Zoot Sims	59	March 23, 1985	New York City, New York, U.S.	Lung cancer
The Singing Nun	51	March 29, 1985	Wavre, Brabant, Belgium	Suicide (Drug Overdose)
Willie Mabon	59	April 19, 1985	Paris, France	Cancer
Rockin' Dave Allen	43	April 28, 1985	Houston, Texas, U.S.	Pneumonia
Larry Clinton	75	May 2, 1985	Tucson, Arizona, U.S.	Cancer
Johnny Fuller	56	May 20, 1985	Oakland, California, U.S.	Lung cancer
Lloyd Glenn	75	May 23, 1985	Los Angeles, California, U.S.	Myocardial infarction
Ines Alfani Tellini Italian opera soprano and director	89	June 1, 1985	Milan, Italy	
Pee Wee Crayton	70	June 25, 1985	Los Angeles, California, U.S.	Heart attack
Wynn Stewart	51	July 17, 1985	Hendersonville, Tennessee, U.S.	Heart attack
Kay Kyser	80	July 31, 1985	Chapel Hill, North Carolina, U.S.	Heart attack
Kyu Sakamoto	43	August 12, 1985	Mount Osutaka, Ueno, Gunma Prefecture, Japan	Plane crash (Japan Air Lines Flight 123)
Jimmy Stokely; Exile	41	August 13, 1985	Richmond, Kentucky, U.S.	Complications from hepatitis/Chronic liver disorder
Philly Joe Jones	62	August 30, 1985	Philadelphia, Pennsylvania, U.S.	Heart attack
Jo Jones	73	September 3, 1985	New York City, New York, U.S.	Pneumonia
Little Brother Montgomery	79	September 6, 1985	Chicago, Illinois, U.S.	Unknown
Brian Keenan; The Chamber Brothers	42	October 5, 1985	Winsted, Winchester, Connecticut, U.S.	Heart attack
Blind John Davis	71	October 12, 1985	Chicago, Illinois, U.S.	Unknown
Ricky Wilson; The B-52's	32	October 12, 1985	New York City, New York, U.S.	Complications due to AIDS
Espen Hoff	22	October 14, 1985	Oslo, Norway	Motorcycle accident
Daniele Pace Famous singer-songwriter, lyricist, and member of the historic satirical group Squallor	50	October 24, 1985	Milan, Italy	Heart attack
Big Joe Turner	74	November 24, 1985	Inglewood, California, U.S.	Heart attack
Ian Stewart; The Rolling Stones	47	December 12, 1985	London, England	Heart attack
Curley Moore	42	December 14, 1985	Algiers, Louisiana, U.S.	Murdered
D. Boon; The Minutemen	27	December 22, 1985	Tucson, Arizona, U.S.	Traffic accident
Gus Jenkins	54	December 22, 1985	Los Angeles, California, U.S.	Unknown
Tommy Blake	54	December 24, 1985	Haughton, Louisiana, U.S.	Murdered by his wife
Eddie Taylor	62	December 25, 1985	Chicago, Illinois, U.S.	Heart attack
Andy Chapin; The Association, Ricky Nelson	34	December 31, 1985	De Kalb, Texas, U.S.	Plane accident
Ricky Nelson; Ricky Nelson	45	December 31, 1985	De Kalb, Texas, U.S.	Plane accident
Bobby Neal; Ricky Nelson	38	December 31, 1985	De Kalb, Texas, U.S.	Plane accident
Pat Woodward; Ricky Nelson	35	December 31, 1985	De Kalb, Texas, U.S.	Plane accident
Ricky Intveld; Ricky Nelson	22	December 31, 1985	De Kalb, Texas, U.S.	Plane accident
Clark Russel; Sound man for Ricky Nelson	35	December 31, 1985	De Kalb, Texas, U.S.	Plane accident

== 1986 ==
Name	Age	Date	Location	Cause of death
Phil Lynott; Thin Lizzy	36	January 4, 1986	Salisbury, Wiltshire, England	Heart failure and pneumonia caused by alcohol and drug use
Joe Farrell; Return to Forever	48	January 10, 1986	Los Angeles, California, U.S.	Myelodysplastic syndrome
Daniel Balavoine	33	January 14, 1986	Gourma-Rharous, Timbuktu Region, Mali	Helicopter crash
Gordon MacRae	64	January 24, 1986	Lincoln, Nebraska, U.S.	Pneumonia
Albert Grossman	59	January 25, 1986	London, United Kingdom, England	Heart attack
John R. American disc jockey and record producer	75	February 15, 1986	Nashville, Tennessee, U.S.	Lung cancer
Robbie Basho	45	February 28, 1986	Berkeley, California, U.S.	Stroke
Richard Manuel; The Band	42	March 4, 1986	Winter Park, Florida, U.S.	Suicide by hanging
Sonny Terry	74	March 11, 1986	Mineola, New York, U.S.	Natural causes
Luciano Virgili Singer	64	March 19, 1986	Prato, Italy	
Mark Dinning	52	March 22, 1986	Jefferson City, Missouri, U.S.	Heart attack
O'Kelly Isley, Jr. The Isley Brothers	48	March 31, 1986	Alpine, New Jersey, U.S.	Heart attack
Dorothy Ashby	53	April 13, 1986	Santa Monica, California, U.S.	Cancer
Graziella Franchini (Lolita) Italian singer, popular between the sixties and seventies	36	April 27, 1986	Lamezia Terme, Italy	Murdered by stabbing
Gianni Ravera Italian singer and impresario	66	May 14, 1986	Rome, Italy	
Hank Mobley	55	May 30, 1986	Philadelphia, Pennsylvania, U.S.	Pneumonia
Benny Goodman	77	June 13, 1986	New York, New York, U.S.	Heart attack
Dean Reed	47	June 13, 1986	East Berlin, GDR	Suicide by drowning
Monk Higgins	49	July 3, 1986	Los Angeles, California, U.S.	Respiratory ailment
Rudy Vallée	84	July 3, 1986	Los Angeles, California, U.S.	Heart attack
Coke Escovedo	45	July 13, 1986	Montebello, California, U.S.	Cirrhosis
Clarence Garlow	75	July 24, 1986	Beaumont, Texas, U.S.	Unknown
Teddy Wilson	73	August 1, 1986	New Britain, Connecticut, U.S.	Illness after surgery
William B. Williams; American disc jockey	62	August 3, 1986	New York City, New York, U.S.	Acute anemia and respiratory failure
Thad Jones	63	August 20, 1986	Copenhagen, Denmark	Cancer/Bone cancer
Marvin Hatley American composer and conductor	81	August 23, 1986	Hollywood, Los Angeles, California, U.S.	Cancer
Pepper Adams	55	September 10, 1986	Brooklyn, New York, U.S.	Lung cancer
Cliff Burton; Metallica	24	September 27, 1986	Ljungby Municipality, Sweden	Traffic accident
Anthony "Tony" Acquaviva American composer, conductor, and string instrumentalist who founded the New York Pops Symphony Orchestra	61	September 27, 1986	Miami, Florida, United States	
Moses Asch	80	October 19, 1986	New York City, New York, U.S.	Unknown
Esquerita	50	October 23, 1986	Harlem, New York, U.S.	Complications due to AIDS
Sippie Wallace	88	November 1, 1986	Detroit, Michigan, United States	Heart ailment
Eddie "Lockjaw" Davis	64	November 3, 1986	Culver City, California, U.S.	Hodgkin's lymphoma
Bobby Nunn; The Coasters	63	November 5, 1986	Los Angeles, California, U.S.	Heart failure
Tracy Pew	28	November 7, 1986	Melbourne, Victoria, Australia	Brain hemorrhage
Bea Booze	74	November 11, 1986	Scottsville, New York, U.S.	Unknown
Scatman Crothers	76	November 22, 1986	Van Nuys, California, U.S.	Pneumonia and lung cancer
Lee Dorsey	61	December 1, 1986	New Orleans, Louisiana, U.S.	Emphysema
Billy Rancher; The Malchicks, Billy Rancher and the Unreal Gods, and Flesh and Blood	29	December 2, 1986	Portland, Oregon, U.S.	Kidney and liver cancer
Desi Arnaz	69	December 2, 1986	Solana Beach, California, U.S.	Lung cancer
Hollywood Fats; Canned Heat, The Blasters	32	December 8, 1986	Los Angeles, California, U.S.	Drug overdose
Kate Wolf	44	December 10, 1986	San Francisco, California, U.S.	Leukemia
Tommy Keifer; Krokus	34	December 24, 1986	Switzerland	Suicide by hanging

== 1987 ==
Name	Age	Date	Location	Cause of death
Peter Lucia, Jr. Tommy James and the Shondells	39	January 6, 1987	Los Angeles, California, U.S.	Heart attack
Handsome Ned	29	January 10, 1987	Toronto, Ontario, Canada	Accidental heroin overdose
Rauli Somerjoki	39	January 14, 1987	Helsinki, Finland	Alcohol-related ailments
Ray Bolger; The Scarecrow from The Wizard of Oz	83	January 15, 1987	Los Angeles, California, U.S.	Bladder cancer
Alfred Lion; Record executive and co-founder of Blue Note Records	78	February 2, 1987	San Diego, California, U.S.	Heart failure
Liberace	67	February 4, 1987	Palm Springs, California, U.S.	AIDS
Claudio Villa	61	February 7, 1987	Padua, Italy	Heart attack
Tony Destra; Cinderella, Britny Fox	32	February 8, 1987	Pennsylvania, U.S.	Car accident
Seymor Spiegelman; The Hilltoppers	56	February 13, 1987	New York City, New York, U.S.	Heart defect
Jimmy Holiday	52	February 15, 1987	Iowa City, Iowa, U.S.	Congestive heart failure
Dirkie Smit; South African Country singer	53	February 16, 1987	Pretoria, South Africa	
Jim Connors; Radio personality and disc jockey	46	February 24, 1987	I-95, Virginia, U.S.	Car crash
Danny Kaye	76	March 3, 1987	Los Angeles, California, U.S.	Heart failure from Hepatitis
Norman Harris; MFSB	39	March 14, 1987	Philadelphia, Pennsylvania, U.S.	Cardiovascular disease
Don Gant	44	March 15, 1987	Nashville, Tennessee, U.S.	Complications following a boating accident
Tony Stratton Smith; Record producer and manager from The Nice, Van der Graaf Generator, Bonzo Dog Doo-Dah Band and co-founder of Charisma Records	53	March 19, 1987	St Helier, Jersey	Pancreatic cancer
Dino Martin; Dino, Desi & Billy	35	March 21, 1987	San Gorgonio Mountain, California, U.S.	Military aircraft crash
Buddy Rich	69	April 2, 1987	Los Angeles, California, U.S.	Respiratory and cardiac failure
Maxine Sullivan	75	April 7, 1987	New York City, New York, U.S.	Seizure
Carlton Barrett; The Wailers	36	April 17, 1987	Kingston, Jamaica	Murder by gunshot
Irving Ashby	66	April 22, 1987	Perris, California, U.S.	Unknown
Billy Johnson; The Moonglows	59	April 28, 1987	Los Angeles, California, U.S.	Unknown
Dalida	54	May 3, 1987	Paris, France	Suicide by drug overdose
Paul Butterfield; The Paul Butterfield Blues Band	44	May 4, 1987	North Hollywood, California, U.S.	Accidental heroin overdose
Allen Jones; Record producer for The Bar-Kays	46	May 5, 1987	Memphis, Shelby County, Tennessee, U.S.	Heart attack
Victor Feldman	53	May 12, 1987	Woodland Hills, California, U.S.	Heart attack
Bruno Pallesi Italian singer and lyricist	66	7 June, 1987	Milan, Italy	
Gary Driscoll; Rainbow, Elf	41	June 8, 1987	Ithaca, New York, U.S.	Murdered
Kid Thomas Valentine	91	June 18, 1987	New Orleans, Louisiana, U.S.	Unknown
Fred Astaire	88	June 22, 1987	Los Angeles, California, U.S.	Pneumonia
Pat McGuigan	52	June 27, 1987	Unknown (likely Ireland)	After a long period of illness
Elizabeth Cotten	94	June 29, 1987	Syracuse, New York, U.S.	Pneumonia
Snakefinger; The Residents	38	July 1, 1987	Linz, Austria	Heart attack
John Hammond; Record producer for Columbia Records	76	July 10, 1987	Manhattan, New York City, U.S.	Stroke
Lee Gaines; The Delta Rhythm Boys	90	July 15, 1987	Helsinki, Finland	Cancer
Pete King; After the Fire, BAP, The Flys	28	July 15, 1987		Testicular cancer
Howard McGhee	69	July 17, 1987	New York City, New York, U.S.	Unknown
Todd Crew; Bassist for Jetboy	21	July 18, 1987	New York, New York County, U.S.	Heroin and alcohol overdose
Alex Sadkin; Record producer for Arcadia, Simply Red, Thompson Twins, Boom Crash Opera and Duran Duran	38	July 25, 1987	Nassau, Bahamas	Traffic accident
Joe Liggins	71	July 31, 1987	Lynwood, California, U.S.	Stroke
David A. Martin; Sam the Sham & the Pharaohs	50	August 2, 1987	Garland, Texas, U.S.	Heart attack
Scott La Rock; Boogie Down Productions	25	August 27, 1987	New York City, New York, U.S.	Gunshot
Peter Tosh; The Wailers	42	September 11, 1987	Kingston, Jamaica	Murder by gunshot
Lorne Greene	72	September 11, 1987	Santa Monica, California, U.S.	Pneumonia
Jaco Pastorius; Weather Report	35	September 21, 1987	Fort Lauderdale, Florida, U.S.	Brain hemorrhage following beating
Ted Taylor; The Cadets	53	October 2, 1987	Lake Charles, Louisiana, U.S.	Traffic accident
Woody Herman	74	October 29, 1987	West Hollywood, California, U.S.	Pneumonia following ulcer surgery
Luke "Long Gone" Miles	62	November 22, 1987	Los Angeles, California, U.S.	Unknown
Little Willy Foster	65	November 25, 1987	Chicago, Illinois, U.S.	Cancer
Guy Marks	64	November 28, 1987	Pomona, New Jersey, U.S.	Unknown
Víctor Yturbe	51	November 28, 1987	Atizapan de Zaragoza, State of Mexico, Mexico	Murder by gunshot
Richard "Ricky" Taylor; The Manhattans	47	December 9, 1987		Long illness
Slam Stewart; Slim & Slam	73	December 10, 1987	Binghamton, New York, U.S.	Congestive heart failure
Clifton Chenier	62	December 12, 1987	Lafayette, Louisiana, U.S.	Complications from diabetes
Conny Plank; Record producer and also known as Moebius & Plank	47	December 18, 1987	Cologne, North Rhine-Westphalia, Germany	Cancer
John Spence; No Doubt	18	December 21, 1987	Anaheim, California, U.S.	Suicide
Luca Prodan; Sumo	34	December 22, 1987	Buenos Aires, Argentina	Cirrhosis
Gene "Bowlegs" Miller	54	December 25, 1987	Memphis, Tennessee, U.S.	Unknown
Nat Tarnopol; Record producer for Brunswick Records	56	December 25, 1987	Las Vegas, Nevada, United States	Congestive heart failure

== 1988 ==
Name	Age	Date	Location	Cause of death
John Dopyera	94	January 3, 1988	Grants Pass, Oregon, U.S.	Unknown
Joe Albany	63	January 12, 1988	New York City, New York, U.S.	Respiratory failure
René Hall	75	February 11, 1988	Los Angeles, California, U.S.	Heart disease
John Curulewski; Styx	37	February 13, 1988	Chicago, Illinois, U.S.	Brain aneurysm
Alexander Bashlachev	27	February 17, 1988	Leningrad, Russian SFSR, Soviet Union	Fall from the window (most likely suicide)
Memphis Slim	72	February 24, 1988	Paris, France	Kidney failure
Pearl Butler; Carl Butler and Pearl	60	March 1, 1988	Franklin, Tennessee, United States	Unknown
Franco Lionello Italian singer	42	March 5, 1988	Milan, Italy	
Divine	42	March 7, 1988	Los Angeles, California, U.S.	Heart enlargement after years of obesity
Gordon Huntley; Matthews Southern Comfort	62	March 7, 1988	Newbury, Berkshire, England	Cancer
Amar Singh Chamkila	27	March 8, 1988	Mehsampur, Punjab, India	Murder by gunshot
Andy Gibb; Younger brother of the Bee Gees	30	March 10, 1988	Oxford, England	Myocarditis worsened by drug addiction
Dannie Richmond	56	March 16, 1988	Harlem, New York, U.S.	Heart attack
Moody Jones	79	March 23, 1988	Chicago, Illinois, U.S.	Unknown
Miguel Abuelo Los Abuelos de la Nada	42	March 26, 1988	Munro, Argentina	Cardiac arrest
Dave Prater; Sam & Dave	50	April 9, 1988	Sycamore, Georgia, U.S.	Traffic accident
Brook Benton	56	April 9, 1988	Queens, New York City, New York, U.S.	Pneumonia from spinal meningitis
Colette Deréal	60	April 12, 1988	Monaco	Heart attack
Pony Poindexter	62	April 14, 1988	Oakland, California, U.S.	Unknown
John Banks; The Merseybeats	45	April 20, 1988	Tel Aviv District, Israel	Throat cancer
Barbara Robison; The Peanut Butter Conspiracy	42	April 22, 1988	Billings, Montana, U.S.	Toxic shock poisoning
Carolyn Franklin	43	April 25, 1988	Bloomfield, Michigan, U.S.	Breast cancer
B. W. Stevenson	38	April 28, 1988	Nashville, Tennessee, U.S.	Heart valve surgery complications
Claude Demetrius	71	May 1, 1988	New York City, New York, U.S.	Unknown
Howie Johnson; The Ventures	54	May 5, 1988	Washington, D.C., U.S.	Cancer
Paul Wilson; The Flamingos	53	May 6, 1988	Chicago, Illinois, U.S.	Unknown
Chet Baker	58	May 13, 1988	Amsterdam, Netherlands	Fell from a hotel window after heroin and cocaine abuse
Gil Evans	75	May 20, 1988	Cuernavaca, Mexico	Peritonitis
Ted Dunbar	51	May 29, 1988	New Brunswick, New Jersey, U.S.	Stroke
Dick Jacobs; Record producer from Decca Records, Brunswick Records	70	May 30, 1988	New York City, New York, U.S.	Unknown
Ricky May	44	June 1, 1988	Sydney, New South Wales, Australia	Heart attack
Charles Jacobie; South African Country singer	60	June 16, 1988	Mbombela, Mpumalanga, South Africa	Heart attack
John Jordan; The Four Vagabonds	74	June 16, 1988	Chicago, Illinois, United States	Unknown
Jesse Ed Davis	43	June 22, 1988	Venice, Los Angeles, California, U.S.	Drug overdose
Hillel Slovak; Red Hot Chili Peppers, What Is This?	26	June 25, 1988	Los Angeles, California, U.S.	Heroin overdose
Jimmy Soul	45	June 25, 1988	Spring Valley, New York, U.S.	Heart attack
Eddie Vinson	70	July 2, 1988	Los Angeles, California, U.S.	Heart attack
Nico	49	July 18, 1988	Ibiza, Spain	Cerebral haemorrhage after fall from bicycle
Priscilla Bowman	60	July 24, 1988	Kansas City, Missouri, U.S.	Lung cancer
Jean-Michel Basquiat; Gray	27	August 12, 1988	Manhattan, New York, U.S.	Speedball overdose
Tenor Saw	21	August 13, 1988	Houston, Texas, United States	Injuries sustained from a hit and run
Fred Below; The Aces	61	August 13 or 14, 1988	Chicago, Illinois, U.S.	Liver cancer
Robert Calvert; Hawkwind	43	August 14, 1988	Ramsgate, England	Heart attack
Roy Buchanan	48	August 14, 1988	Fairfax County, Virginia, U.S.	Suicide by hanging
Herbert Pagani Italian singer-songwriter, artist, actor, comedian and television and radio host	44	August 16, 1988	Palm Beach, Florida, U.S.	
Carlos Paião	30	August 26, 1988	N1 road, Ponte Amieira, Rio Maior, Santarém, Portugal	Car accident
Franca Raimondi	56	August 28, 1988	Monopoli, Bari, Italy	Cancer
Tim Davis; The Steve Miller Band	44	September 20, 1988	Lancaster, Grant County, Wisconsin, U.S.	Complications related to diabetes
J. C. Heard	71	September 27, 1988	Royal Oak, Michigan, U.S.	Heart attack
Cliff Gallup; Gene Vincent and His Blue Caps	58	October 9, 1988	Norfolk, Virginia, U.S.	Heart attack
Son House	86	October 19, 1988	Detroit, Michigan, U.S.	Laryngeal cancer
Johnnie Louise Richardson; Johnnie & Joe	53	October 25, 1988	New York City, New York, U.S.	Stroke
Black Randy; Black Randy and the Metrosquad	36	November 11, 1988	Los Angeles, California, U.S.	Complications due to AIDS
Janet Ertel; The Chordettes	75	November 22, 1988	Sheboygan, Sheboygan County, Wisconsin, U.S.	
Tata Giacobetti Italian singer and double bass player, member of the Quartetto Cetra	66	December 2, 1988	Rome, Italy	
Roy Orbison; Traveling Wilburys	52	December 6, 1988	Hendersonville, Tennessee, U.S.	Heart attack
Bill Harris; The Clovers	63	December 6, 1988	Washington, D.C., U.S.	Pancreatic cancer
Herbert Rhoad; The Persuasions	44	December 8, 1988	Sacramento, California, U.S.	Aneurysm
Sylvester	41	December 16, 1988	San Francisco, California, U.S.	AIDS
Federico Moura Virus	37	December 21, 1988	Buenos Aires, Argentina	Respiratory arrest due to complications from AIDS
Paul Jeffreys; Steve Harley and Cockney Rebel	36	December 21, 1988	Lockerbie, Scotland	Pan Am Flight 103 bombing

== 1989 ==
Name	Age	Date	Location	Cause of death
Eddie Heywood	73	January 3, 1989	Miami Beach, Florida, U.S.	Parkinson's disease
Bobby Baylor; The Solitaires, The Mello-Moods	54	January 4, 1989	Harlem, New York, United States	Pneumonia
Patti McCabe; The Poni-Tails	49	January 17, 1989	Ohio, United States	Cancer
Whistlin' Alex Moore	89	January 20, 1989	Dallas, Texas, U.S.	Heart attack
Steve Wahrer; The Trashmen	47	January 21, 1989	Saint Paul, Minnesota, U.S.	Throat cancer
Donnie Elbert	52	January 26, 1989	Philadelphia, Pennsylvania, U.S.	Stroke
Blaze Foley	39	February 1, 1989	Austin, Texas, U.S.	Shot to Death
Paul Robi; The Platters	57	February 1, 1989	Los Angeles, California, United States	Pancreatic cancer
Kenneth C. "Jethro" Burns; Homer and Jethro	68	February 4, 1989	Evanston, Illinois, U.S.	Prostate cancer
Joe Raposo; Television writer and lyrics from Sesame Street	51	February 5, 1989	Bronxville, New York, U.S.	Lymphoma
King Tubby	48	February 6, 1989	Kingston, Jamaica	Shot to Death
Hip Linkchain	52	February 13, 1989	Chicago, Illinois, U.S.	Cancer
Vincent Crane; The Crazy World of Arthur Brown, Dexys Midnight Runners, Atomic Rooster	45	February 14, 1989	Westminster, London, England	Suicide by barbiturate overdose
Betty Mars	44	February 20, 1989	La Défense, France	Suicide by jumping
Franco Fanigliulo Italian singer-songwriter	44	February 21, 1989	La Spezia, Italy	
Roy Eldridge	78	February 26, 1989	Valley Stream, New York, U.S.	Heart failure
Tina Allori Italian singer	64	February 27, 1989	Amatrice, Italy	
Odie Payne	62	March 1, 1989	Chicago, Illinois, U.S.	Unknown
Bobby Mitchell	53	March 17, 1989	New Orleans, Louisiana, United States	Diabetes
Marek Blizinski	41	March 17, 1989	Warsaw, Poland	Cancer
Ray Agee	68	April 15, 1989	Los Angeles, California, U.S.	Unknown
Dmitry Selivanov	25	April 22, 1989	Novosibirsk, Russia	Suicide
Lucille Ball	77	April 26, 1989	Los Angeles, California, U.S.	Aortic rupture
Ron Wilson; The Surfaris	44	May 7, 1989	Placer County, California, U.S.	Brain aneurysm
Keith Whitley	34	May 9, 1989	Goodlettsville, Tennessee, U.S.	Alcohol poisoning
Good Rockin' Charles	56	May 17, 1989	Chicago, Illinois, U.S.	Unknown (ill health)
John Cipollina; Quicksilver Messenger Service	45	May 29, 1989	San Francisco, California, U.S.	Emphysema
Lou Monte	72	June 12, 1989	Pompano Beach, Florida, U.S.	Emphysema
Vivian Carter; Record producer, company executive and co-founded of Vee Jay Records	68	June 12, 1989	Gary, Indiana, U.S.	Hypertension, diabetes and stroke
Pete de Freitas; Echo & the Bunnymen	27	June 14, 1989	London, England	Traffic accident
Finbarr Donnelly; Five Go Down to the Sea?	27	June 18, 1989	The Serpentine, Hyde Park, London, England	Drowning accident
Hibari Misora	52	June 24, 1989	Minato, Tokyo, Japan	Interstitial pneumonia
Chris McCaffery; The Pale Fountains	28	July, 1989	Metropolitan Borough of Liverpool, Merseyside, England	Brain tumor
Vic Maile	45	July 11, 1989	Marlow Common, Buckinghamshire, England	Cancer
Nesuhi Ertegun; Record producer, record executive of Atlantic Records and Warner Music Group	71	July 15, 1989	New York City, New York, U.S.	Complications of cancer surgery
Paul C East Coast hip hop pioneer, producer, engineer, and mixer	24	July 17, 1989	New York City, New York, U.S.	Murdered
Bull Moose Jackson	70	July 31, 1989	Cleveland, Ohio, U.S.	Lung cancer
Larry Parnes	59	August 4, 1989	London, England	Meningitis
Sonny Thompson	65	August 11, 1989	Chicago, Illinois, U.S.	Unknown
Bergen	31	August 14, 1989	Pozantı, Adana, Turkey	Murdered by Halis Serbest
Raul Seixas	44	August 21, 1989	São Paulo, State of São Paulo, Brazil	Cardiac arrest following acute pancreatitis
Mickey Hawks	49	August 31, 1989	North Carolina, U.S.	Unknown
Keef Cowboy; Grandmaster Flash and the Furious Five	28	September 8, 1989	The Bronx, New York City, U.S	Heart attack after crack-cocaine overdose
Tim Hovey; New Riders of the Purple Sage	43	September 9, 1989	Watsonville, California, U.S.	Suicide by drug overdose
Pérez Prado	72	September 14, 1989	Mexico City, Mexico	Stroke
Gene Nobles; American disc jockey	76	September 21, 1989	Nashville, Tennessee, U.S.	Unknown
Irving Berlin	101	September 22, 1989	Manhattan, New York City, U.S.	Natural causes and heart attack
Cousin Joe	81	October 2, 1989	New Orleans, Louisiana, U.S.	Natural causes
Alan Murphy; Go West, Level 42	35	October 19, 1989	London, England	Pneumonia resulting from AIDS
Ewan MacColl	74	October 22, 1989	Brompton, London, England	Complications following heart surgery
Sahib Shihab	64	October 24, 1989	Nashville, Tennessee, U.S.	Cancer
Barry Sadler	49	November 5, 1989	Murfreesboro, Tennessee, U.S.	Cardiac arrest
Dickie Goodman; Record producer	55	November 8, 1989	North Carolina, U.S.	Shot himself
Freddie Waits	49	November 18, 1989	New York City, New York, U.S.	Kidney failure
Billy Lyall; Bay City Rollers, Pilot	36	December 1, 1989	Newburyport, Essex County, Massachusetts, U.S.	AIDS
Patti Santos; It's a Beautiful Day	39	December 14, 1989	Near Geyserville, California, U.S.	Car crash
Floyd Jones	72	December 19, 1989	Chicago, Illinois, U.S.	Unknown
Lance Railton "Earl Preston & the TT's"	46	December 24, 1989	Hemel Hempstead, Hertfordshire, England	Unknown

== See also ==
- List of 1950s deaths in popular music
- List of 1960s deaths in popular music
- List of 1970s deaths in popular music
- List of 1990s deaths in popular music
- List of 2000s deaths in popular music
- List of 2010s deaths in popular music
- List of 2020s deaths in popular music
