= Hy Weiss =

- Born: Hyman Y. Weiss; February 12, 1923; Cuca, Argeș County, Romania
- Died: March 20, 2007 (aged 84); Englewood, New Jersey, United States
- Occupation: Record producer
- Known for: Owner of Old Town Records
- Spouse: Rosalyn Weiss
- Children: 3 including Barry Weiss

Hyman Y. "Hy" Weiss (February 12, 1923 – March 20, 2007) was an American record producer of pop and rhythm and blues music in the 1950s and 1960s, and the founder of Old Town Records.

== Biography ==
Born to a Jewish family in Cuca, Argeș County, Romania, he was an immigrant to the United States as a baby in 1924 and was brought up in the Bronx, New York. There, he established a friendship with Morris Levy, who would also become active in the music business. He served in the US Army Air Force in World War II, before working briefly as a bouncer and as a furrier. He started in the music industry as a record salesman, and set up Parody Records with his brother Sam in 1949.

His record label, Old Town Records, was established in August 1953 and was active until 1966. Weiss took sole control of the label in 1956. He was primarily a producer of doo wop groups, as well as blues music. Old Town had its first hit with the 1958 single "We Belong Together" by Robert & Johnny, and had further hits by Billy Bland, the Solitaires, the Capris, the Earls, Ella Johnson, Arthur Prysock and others. The Old Town catalog was sold by Weiss to Atlantic Records in 1970. Subsequently, Weiss worked for Stax Records. He had a co-writer credit for the song "Foggy Notion" by the Velvet Underground, along with all the members of the band. Weiss revived Old Town as a vehicle for Arthur Prysock in 1973, having repossessed his previous master tapes and kept the label going until about 1978.

Weiss was described as "one of the most colorful characters of the New York independent record business" and as "brash, miserable and explosive by turns... [He] had a bulging contacts book and was both courted and feared in an industry notoriously not for the faint-hearted." He was associated with the practice of "payola", being credited as the inventor of the "$50 handshake", and once said: "Why waste time going out with someone you don't like, and sit down and feast with them when you can't stand them? Just give them the money and let them play the [fucking] record."

== Personal life ==
In 1954, he married Rosalyn Weiss; she died in 1996. He was a resident of Rockleigh, New Jersey. He died in Englewood, New Jersey, on March 20, 2007, at the age of 84. He was survived by two daughters, Maureen Weiss Spergel and Pam Weiss Katz; and a son, Barry Weiss, the Chairman and CEO of Island Def Jam/Universal Motown Republic.

== Notable artists ==
- Billy Bland
- The Capris
- The Co-eds
- The Earls
- The Fiestas
- Larry Finnegan
- Bob Gaddy
- The 5 Crowns
- The Gypsies
- The Harptones
- Ella Johnson
- Ruth McFadden
- Arthur Prysock
- Robert & Johnny
- The Solitaires
