= Where Are You? (1937 song) =

Composition by Jimmy McHugh, with lyrics by Harold Adamson

- by Jimmy McHugh, Harold Adamson
- Genre: Traditional Pop

Premiere
- Date: 18 April 1937
- Performers: Gertrude Niesen

"Where Are You?" is a popular song composed by Jimmy McHugh, with lyrics by Harold Adamson. The song was written for the 1937 film Top of the Town and was originally performed by Gertrude Niesen. Niesen also made a commercial recording of the song for Brunswick Records and this was popular.

"Where Are You?" has been recorded by many performers.

== Notable versions ==
- Mildred Bailey - very popular in 1937 – this version is a crucial piece of music in Love Streams, a 1984 American film by John Cassavetes
- Adelaide Hall's recording of the song reached #28 in the U.K. singles chart in December 1941.
- Arthur Tracy Decca F. 6465 (1937).
- Connee Boswell - recorded February 15, 1937 for Decca Records (catalog No. 1160).
- The Hi-Lo's – Listen! (1954).
- Chris Connor – Chris Connor (1956)
- Vera Lynn - for her album If I Am Dreaming (1956).
- Patti Page - Page 3 - A Collection of Her Most Famous Songs (1957).
- Frank Sinatra – Where Are You? (1957)
- Ben Webster – Soulville (1957)
- Kenny Dorham – This Is the Moment! (1958)
- Jaye P. Morgan - Just You, Just Me (1958).
- Johnny Mathis - Faithfully (1959)
- Shirley Bassey - Shirley Bassey (1961)
- Dexter Gordon – Go (1962)
- Sonny Rollins – The Bridge (1962)
- Dinah Washington – Dinah '62 (1962).
- Aretha Franklin – Laughing on the Outside (1963)
- Bill Henderson with the Oscar Peterson Trio – Bill Henderson with the Oscar Peterson Trio (1963)
- Brenda Lee – ..."Let Me Sing" (1963)
- Julie London – Love on the Rocks (1963)
- Vikki Carr Discovery! Miss Vikki Carr (1964).
- Arthur Prysock – Arthur Prysock and Count Basie (1965)
- Ella Fitzgerald – 30 by Ella (1968)
- Mal Waldron – Where Are You? (1989)
- Vic Damone - Signature Collection Vol.1 (2000)
- Kurt Elling – Nightmoves (2007)
- Bob Dylan – Shadows in the Night (2015)
- Ahmad Jamal - Chicago Revisited: Live at Joe Segal's Jazz Showcase (1992)
