= Old Town Records =

Record label in New York City (1953–1966)

Old Town Records was a record label set up by Hy Weiss in New York City. It operated between 1953 and 1966, and was responsible for several R&B and doo-wop hit records.

Weiss, who was born in Romania, lived in the Bronx from the 1920s, and began working as a furrier. In the mid-1940s, with his brother Sam, he started distributing records produced in California by Leon René, soon expanding into distributing records by other companies including Modern and Apollo. In 1953, he set up his own label, Old Town, taking its name, and its early stationery, from that of a wholesale paper business in Brooklyn for whom Weiss worked.

Weiss took sole control of the label in 1956. He was primarily a producer of vocal groups, as well as blues music. Old Town had its first hit with the 1958 single "We Belong Together" by Robert & Johnny, and had further hits by Billy Bland ("Let the Little Girl Dance"), the Solitaires ("Walking Along "), the Fiestas ("So Fine"), the Capris ("There's a Moon Out Tonight"), the Earls ("Remember Then"), and others. Arthur Prysock was the label's primary album artist, and the label also recorded blues musicians including Sonny Terry. In addition, Old Town released many vocal records that were successful in the New York area, but did not break nationally or internationally.

The Old Town catalog was sold by Weiss to Atlantic Records in 1970. The label re-emerged between 1973 and 1978, issuing several albums by Arthur Prysock. Weiss died in 2007.
