= Larry Chance =

American doo-wop singer (1940–2023)

- Born: Lawrence Figueiredo; October 19, 1940; The Bronx, New York, U.S.
- Died: September 5, 2023 (aged 82) Orlando, Florida, U.S.
- Genres: Doo-wop
- Occupation: Singer
- Years active: 1960s–2023
- Formerly of: Larry Chance and the Earls
- Website: larrychanceandtheearls.com

Lawrence Figueiredo (October 19, 1940 – September 5, 2023), better known as Larry Chance, was an American musician and the lead singer of the 1960s doo-wop group Larry Chance and the Earls, originally known as The Earls.

Larry Chance was born in The Bronx, New York, and raised in Philadelphia, Pennsylvania. Moving back to New York, he originally formed his group as The High Hatters. The group was eventually rechristened The Earls and Figueiredo changed his last name to Chance, after the record label. In 1962, the Earls' single "Remember Then" was a national hit. Other records entered the charts, including "Never" (top 5 on the local New York chart), "Life Is But a Dream" (top 10 on the local New York charts), and "I Believe", considered an East Coast classic. Other recordings include "Looking For My Baby" and "Kissing". Albums included Remember Me Baby, The Earls: Today, The Earls – LIVE, Earl Change, and Streets of the Bronx.

Chance also had a short-lived solo career in the late 1960s, but as the oldies revival scene started a strong run in the early 1970s and 1980s, the Earls became one of the most requested groups in the doo-wop genre and Chance returned to the group. They continued to perform actively and remained popular on the oldies circuit.

Chance was diagnosed with cancer in 2000, but went successfully through chemotherapy. He performed at the 2001 DOO WOP special in Pittsburgh, and told his fans about his experiences with his illness, before he sang "I Believe". He died of lung cancer in Orlando, Florida, on September 5, 2023, at the age of 82.
