= Jimmy Velvet =

American soft rock and roll vocalist

- Origin: United States
- Occupation: Singer
- Years active: 1960s, 1970s, ?
- Labels: Cub, ABC-Paramount, Witch, Philips, Cameo, Royal American, United Artists, VTR Sundi Records, Velvet Tone Record Corp., Music City Records,

Jimmy Tennant, better known as Jimmy Velvet, was an early American soft rock and roll vocalist during the 1960s. His most popular singles were "We Belong Together" and "It's Almost Tomorrow".

== Background ==
Tennant was born in Jacksonville, Florida, where he became involved in music entertainment. It was there he met Elvis Presley, and they became lifelong close friends. After Elvis' death, Tennant operated an Elvis memorabilia museum in Memphis for about twenty years.

In the early 1960s, he worked as the manager for a singer from Texas named James Mullins, who used the name Jimmy Velvit. The two soon split due to disagreements. Tennant, who had recorded under his name in the late 1950s, began using Jimmy Velvet as his show name by early 1963. Mullins continued recording separately using the Velvit spelling and is still recording to this day. They both separately made recordings of "We Belong Together" during that period. When Tennant first recorded and released "We Belong Together in April 1963, his intent was to be billed as Jimmy Velvet. But when the initial records were made, a copy of the earlier Mullins release on Cub was used as an informational reference, and his name was given as "Velvit". The label was also named as such, as the intent was to sell the record with the name association for the label. Only 1,000 copies were made, and most were destroyed. In July, more copies were made with the label name changed to the intended VELVET spelling, but Jimmy's name still showed as Velvit. Of the two singers, only Tennant's "We Belong Together" and "It's Almost Tomorrow" reached the Top 100 charts. A later album titled Reflections of...Jimmy Velvet's Greatest Hits did contain both those charted songs and may still be found today.

Velvet toured in 1973-1978 with the Jimmy Velvet Show band. Band members included Steve Morgan (guitar), John Collins (bassist), Dennis Moog (drums), and Kathy Slinkard Velvet (stage name Kathy Scott, married to Jimmy from 1970-1997)(keyboards)

Velvet was championed by TV host Dick Clark, who had him on his American Bandstand show more than once. Clark helped him release a 1967 album, A Touch of Velvet. The LP contained some of Jimmy's single releases, including the title song and "It's Almost Tomorrow", but not "We Belong Together". Jimmy used various labels for his releases, including his label named Velvet Tone.

Velvet is still involved with the music field and has published an autobiography titled Inside the Dream (2007), which includes a wealth of celebrity photographs from the early days of rock and roll.

== Career ==
It was reported by Cash Box in the magazine's 26 October 1963 issue that due to the breakout action in Southern areas of Jimmy Velvet's song "We Belong Together", the master recording had been turned over to ABC-Paramount. The song would eventually get to no. 75 on the Billboard chart.

It was noted in the 25 July 1964 issue of Music Business that Velvet's "Wisdom of a Fool" single was getting a good amount of radio exposure in the East, South, Mid-West and West. Also that year, his single, "To the Isle" made it to no. 118.

In 1965, his single, "It's Almost Tomorrow" charted at no. 93.

Working with arranger Bill Justis, Velvet recorded the song "Take Me Tonight". According to the 17 December issue of Record World, the single was scheduled for release on 26 December. Bobby Boyd of the Boyd label was said to be doing an all out campaign for the disc.

== Discography ==
As by Jimmie Tennant

"The Witness"/ "Giggle Wiggle" (Thunder 1000), early 1958

"Salute"/ "The Big Retreat" (Warwick 533) April, 1960

(Note that a record by Jimmie Tennant, "You're The Beat Within My Heart"/ "Heartbreak Avenue" (Amp 790) released in January 1959, is by a different Jimmie Tennant, born James D. Tennant in 1935 in Indiana)

As by Kitt 'N' Kory (Jimmie was Kory, Kitt was a girl named Judy)

"First Star"/ "Across The Moon" (Warwick 523) February, 1960

As by Jimmy Velvit

"You're Mine And We Belong Together"/ "I'm Gonna Try To Forget The One I Love" (Velvit 201-63) April, 1963

"You're Mine And We Belong Together"/ "I'm Gonna Try To Forget the One I Love" (Velvet 201-63) July, 1963

"You're Mine And We Belong Together"/ "I'm Gonna Try To Forget The One I Love" (Witch 115) August, 1963

(Note that a record released with the same two songs as by Jimmy Velvit on Cub Records K9105 in January, 1962 is one by Jimmy Mullins, not Tennant. Tennant had intended to be billed as Jimmy Velvet, but the Cub release was used as a reference and the error was made. Mullins wrote "I'm Gonna Try...".)

As by Jimmy Velvet

"We Belong Together"/ "The History Of Love" (ABC-Paramount 10488) November, 1963

"To The Aisle"/ "Lonely, Lonely Night" (ABC-Paramount 10528) April, 1964

"Teen Angel"/ "Mission Bell" (Velvet Tone 101) November, 1964

"Teen Angel"/ "Mission Bell" (Tollie 9037) December, 1964

"Young Hearts"/ "It's Almost Tomorrow" (Velvet Tone 102) 1964

"It's Almost Tomorrow"/ "Blue Eyes (Don't Run Away)" (Velvet Tone 103) 1965

"It's Almost Tomorrow"/ "Blue Eyes (Don't Run Away)" (Philips 40285) April, 1965

"Young Hearts"/ "I Won't Be Back This Year" (Philips 40314) August, 1965

"Take Me Tonight"/ "Young Hearts" (Velvet Tone 106) February, 1967

"Take Me Tonight"/ "Young Hearts" (Cameo 464) 1967

"Roses Are Blue"/ "A Touch Of Velvet" (Cameo 488) 1967

EP - GOLDEN HITS ("We Belong Together", "Teen Angel"/ "It's Almost Tomorrow", "Mission Bell") (Velvet Tone VTR-201) 1967

"Sigma Alpha Lonely"/ "Candy Heart" (Velvet Tone 112) December, 1967

LP - A TOUCH OF VELVET (Velvet Tone VTR-S-501) December, 1967

- "Once I Had A Heart"
- "Sigma Alpha Lonely"
- "Mission Bell"
- "Teen Angel"
- "A Touch Of Velvet"//
- "It's Almost Tomorrow"
- "Roses Are Blue"
- "Candy Heart"
- "I Won't Be Back This Year"
- "Run, Run Mr. Sun"

LP - A TOUCH OF VELVET (United Artists UAS 6653) 1968

"Sigma Alpha Lonely"/ "Candy Heart" (United Artists 50279) March, 1968

"It's You"/ "A Woman" (Royal American 286) June, 1968

"Missing You"/ "Blue Velvet" (Royal American 291) 1969

"(Things That Make A Woman) A Woman"/ "Wasted Years" (VTR 1503) 1970

"(Things That Make A Woman) A Woman"/ "Wasted Years" (VTR-Sundi V/SR-7101) March, 1971

LP - A TOUCH OF VELVET (Music City VTR-501) 1973 (re-issue of 1967 Velvet Tone LP)

LP - BLUE VELVET (Music City MCR-502) 1973 (with the Kathy Scott Singers)

- "Blue Velvet"
- "(Things That Make A Woman) A Woman"
- "Candida" (originally issued on VTR 1504 single credited to Dawn Patrol)
- "It's You"
- "Wasted Years"
- "Missing You"//
- "I Still Believe In Tomorrow"
- "Love's Gonna Rise Up (Again)"
- "(You're Mine And) We Belong Together"
- "You Better Move On"
- "I Really Don't Want To Know"
- "Half A Man" (originally issued on VTR 1504 single credited to Dawn Patrol)

"It's You"/ "Wasted Years" (Music City MCR 888) 1973 (with the Kathy Scott Singers)

(Note that records as by Jimmy Velvet on the BLUE, BELL, BI, and TEAR DROP labels are not by Tennant. They are actually by Jimmy Mullins, otherwise known as Jimmy Velvit or James Bell.)

As by Kathy And Jimmy (Kathy is Kathy Scott)

"I Still Believe In Tomorrow"/ "Love's Gonna Rise Up Again" (VTR 1501) 1970
