= Remember Then =

Single by The Earls
- B-side: "Let's Waddle"
- Released: 1962
- Recorded: 1962
- Genre: Pop, doo wop, rock and roll
- Length: 2:09
- Label: Old Town
- Songwriters: Tony Powers, Beverly Ross; Some versions additionally or alternatively credit Stan Vincent
- Producer: Hy Weiss

The Earls singles chronology
"Remember Then" (1962)	"Never" (1963)

"Remember Then" is a pop song written by Tony Powers and Beverly Ross, and first recorded in 1962 by doo-wop vocal group The Earls. Original copies of The Earls' version, on the Old Town label, show only Powers as the writer, while some later versions give a writing or co-writing credit to record producer Stan Vincent. BMI lists all three as co-writers.

In late 1962 and early 1963, the song spent nine weeks on the Billboard Hot 100, reaching No. 24, while reaching No. 29 on Billboard's Hot R&B Singles chart. In Canada the song also reached No. 24. The song has since become widely used by rock and roll revival acts and remains well known for its chorus of "Re-meh-meh, re-meh-meh-mem-ber (oop-shoop) / Re-meh-meh, re-meh-meh-mem-ber (oop-shoop)...." Tony Powers later remembered the song being written with Ross (who also co-wrote the song "Lollipop"):

"Beverly and I made a plan to try and write something at her apartment between Broadway and 8th Avenue.... I remember sitting with her at the piano and just riffing on stuff... and somewhere in that process of tossing out ideas one of us must have hit on "Remember When" (its original title....). I'm sure the second we hit on the title we had the riff: "Re-meh-meh, Re-meh-meh-mem-ber, Re-meh-meh, Re-meh-meh-mem-ber, Re-meh-meh, Re-meh-meh-mem-ber, When, When, Remember when..." Either she started the music lick, or I started the lyric lick, or vice-versa...and off we went...once we had that the song just basically wrote itself. Beverly was doing business with Aaron Schroeder at his January Music, so we brought the song there, he loved it, got it to Hy Weiss, and that was that. What I do remember vividly though was walking in Central Park after it hit the charts and passing someone with a radio... and "Remember When" was playing...that was the very first time I ever heard a song of mine being played over the air...wow!"

A commercially unsuccessful British cover version was released in 1963 by Jimmy Powell. The song was also recorded by American rock and roll group Sha Na Na in 1969, and by British group Showaddywaddy in 1979. Showaddywaddy's version reached no. 17 on the UK singles chart. The Wizards, a short-lived doo-wop group featuring Joel Katz, recorded a cover version around 1981/1982.

This song was featured in the 1993 film A Bronx Tale.
