= Pearl Reaves =

American singer

- Publicity photo of Pearl Reaves and the Paul Farano Trio taken in the 1960s. Robert Green, Eddie Shaw, Pearl Reaves Farano, Paul Farano.

Background information
- Born: Pearl Reaves; June 7, 1929 (Note: The LeBlanc book lists her birth date as June 7, 1929; the Kochakian interview lists it as June 6, 1928.); Raleigh, North Carolina, U.S.
- Died: March 6, 2000 (aged 70) Boston, Massachusetts, U.S.
- Genres: R&B, Rock and roll, Soul, Gospel
- Occupations: Singer, guitarist
- Instruments: Vocals, guitar
- Years active: 1950s–1980s
- Label: Harlem

Pearl Reaves (June 7, 1929 – March 6, 2000), also known by her married name, Pearl Farano, was an American R&B singer and guitar player, best known for her 1955 single, "I'm Not Ashamed (Ugly Woman)". She was unusual for her time in that she sang lead and played guitar, backed by male performers.

== Life and career ==
Pearl Reaves was born and grew up in Raleigh, North Carolina. In 1949 she moved to Rahway, New Jersey, to live with her sister, who had a teaching job there. The Palace Blue Room in Rahway, owned by Paul Farano, held weekly amateur talent contests. Reaves entered and won five weeks in a row. Farano was impressed, and hired her as his house singer, fronting the Paul Farano Trio. A drummer, he taught her how to play the guitar, piano and organ. Within two years, Reaves and Farano were married.

The Palace Blue Room closed in 1951. Reaves and the band toured the east coast, playing jazz and rock and roll at the Stork Club in New York City, the Peppermint Lounge in Boston, Zacks in Falmouth, Massachusetts, and many other venues. The band's lineup changed frequently over the years; members at various times included Charlie Gilbert (sax), Robert Green (sax), Bobby Malenni (sax), Skip Johnson (organ), Webster Lewis (organ), Lonnie Youngblood (sax), James Lucas (organ), Otis Sutton (drums), Eddie Shaw (organ; formerly of the Knights), and Richie McCrae (organ). Youngblood, who got his start with Reaves, recalled in an interview years later, "Oh, we used to walk the bar, do everything! It was an exciting show, and it was only a four piece band. She played guitar and sang, and she was really fine – she really looked great."

=== Harlem label ===
In 1955, Morty Shad of Harlem Records saw Reaves perform in a New York club and signed her to record a single: "You Can't Stay Here (Step It Up And Go)", a rock and roll song, and "I'm Not Ashamed (Ugly Woman)", a blues song in which the narrator admits to being ugly but suggests that other, unnamed, qualities make up for that. The backup group was the Concords, which consisted of Milton Love (who later became the lead singer for the Solitaires), Joe Willis, Bob Thompson, and Jimmy Hunter. Both songs did well in the New York area and were favorably reviewed in Billboard magazine. The reviewer was more impressed with "You Can't Be Here", writing, "Jump blues is taken for a wild ride in this infectious reading by the warbler. It moves well throughout and projects excitement."

=== Pearlsfar label ===
In the 1960s Reaves and her husband moved to Boston, where they spent the rest of their lives. (According to Milton Love's biography, she was from the Roxbury neighborhood of Boston). The couple started their own record label, Pearlsfar, and over the next two decades, in addition to performing live at local nightclubs, released several singles as Pearl Reaves and the Farano Trio. Later Farano changed the trio's name to Father Time and the Tic Tocs. Reaves also recorded a single with Tracy and the Tracynettes. Reaves and Farano jointly wrote and published at least six songs.

In the 1980s Reaves gave up performing and became a preacher. She recorded one last single in 1982 with the High Lites of Joy: "Use Me, Lord", a gospel song, and the gospel-funk "Who's Your Boss". In 1985 she was the subject of a three-page article in Whiskey, Women and..., a blues and R&B magazine. At the time of the interview, she was preaching at the Mount Olive Temple of Christ, a non-denominational church in the Dorchester neighborhood of Boston. She died in Boston in 2000.

Although Reaves recorded only a handful of singles, they span four decades and several genres including R&B, rock and roll, soul, funk and gospel. Her singles are prized by collectors and her recordings are included in compilation albums such as Rhythm & Blues Goes Rock & Roll (Past Perfect, 2002) and Stompin' 20 (Stompin Street, 2003). She is included alongside Big Mama Thornton in Tough Mamas (Krazy Kat, UK, 1989), a collection of female-led blues and R&B songs, and she is paired with soul singer Ruby Johnson in Ruby Johnson Meets Pearl Reaves (Titanic, 1993). Oddly enough, "You Can't Stay Here" is included in New York Knockouts (Moonshine, 1995) while its B side, "I'm Not Ashamed", is included in Rare 1950s Boston Doo Wops (Eagle, 2003).

== Singles ==
- Pearl Reaves and the Concords, "You Can't Stay Here"/"I'm Not Ashamed", Harlem, 1955
- Pearl Reaves with Paul Farano Trio, "He's Gone"/"Guitfiddle", Pearlsfar, 1958
- Pearl Reaves with Paul Farano Trio, "I Want You To Love Me"/"Forty Long Years", Pearlsfar, 1958
- Pearl Reaves with Paul Farano Trio, "High Noon"/"King Kong Sweet", Pearlsfar, 19??
- Pearl Reaves with Paul Farano Trio, "Something"/"Come On", Pearlsfar, 19??
- Sweet Daddy Siki/Pearl Reaves with Paul Farano Trio, "Rock & Roll Shimmy Shimmy Partner"/"Mama Give Me Your Permission", Pearlsfar, 1962
- Pearl Reaves & the Tracynettes, "How Can I Tell"/"Change Me", Pearlsfar, 1966
- Pearl Reeves (Note: The 1972 single is the only one on which her name is spelled "Reeves".) with Father Time and the Tic Tocs, "Cool with a Groove"/"Same Old Love", Pearlsfar, 1970
- Pearl Farano and the High Lites of Joy, "Use Me Lord"/"Who's Your Boss", Pearlsfar, 1982

== Published songs ==
- "I Created You" (1956)
- "Aching Heart" (1959)
- "Never Thought" (1959)
- "Poison Ivory" (1962)
- "Don't Let My Love Be in Vain" (1969)
- "Three Little Words" (1969)
