= Arthur Prysock and Count Basie =

Studio album by Arthur Prysock
- Released: 1965
- Recorded: 1965
- Genre: Vocal jazz
- Length: 42:57
- Label: Verve

Arthur Prysock chronology
In a Mood (1962)	Arthur Prysock and Count Basie (1965)	Art and Soul (1966)

Professional ratings
Review scores
Source	Rating
Allmusic	3/5 stars

Arthur Prysock and Count Basie is a 1965 studio album by Arthur Prysock and Count Basie and his orchestra.

== Track listing ==
1. "I Could Have Told You" (Carl Sigman, Jimmy Van Heusen) – 3:44
2. "Ain't No Use" (Leroy Kirkland, Sidney Wyche) – 2:45
3. "I Could Write a Book" (Lorenz Hart, Richard Rodgers) – 3:40
4. "Gone Again" (Curley Hamner, Lionel Hampton, Curtis Lewis) – 3:09
5. "Come Home" (Buddy Johnson) – 3:41
6. "I Worry 'Bout You" (Norman Mapp) – 2:16
7. "What Will I Tell My Heart?" (Irving Gordon, Jack Lawrence, Peter Tinturin) – 2:46
8. "Don't Go to Strangers" (Redd Evans, Arthur Kent, Dave Mann) – 2:47
9. "I'm Lost" (Otis René) – 3:21
10. "I'm Gonna Sit Right Down and Write Myself a Letter"(Fred E. Ahlert, Joe Young) – 2:52
11. "Come Rain or Come Shine" (Harold Arlen, Johnny Mercer) – 2:21
12. "Where Are You?" (Harold Adamson, Jimmy McHugh) – 3:43 Bonus track on CD reissue; originally on Old Town LP 2011
13. "Do Nothin' Till You Hear from Me" (Duke Ellington, Bob Russell) – 3:14 Bonus track on CD reissue; originally on Old Town LP 2011
14. "Sunday" (Chester Conn, Benny Krueger, Nathan "Ned" Miller, Jule Styne) – 2:38 Bonus track on CD reissue; originally on Old Town LP 2011

== Personnel ==
- Arthur Prysock – vocal

The Count Basie Orchestra

- Count Basie – piano
- Sonny Cohn – trumpet
- Al Aarons – trumpet
- Wallace Davenport – trumpet
- Phil Guilbeau – trumpet
- Grover Mitchell – trombone
- Bill Hughes – trombone
- Henderson Chambers – trombone
- Al Grey – trombone
- Henry Coker – trombone
- Marshal Royal – alto saxophone
- Bobby Plater – alto saxophone
- Eric Dixon – tenor saxophone
- Eddie "Lockjaw" Davis – tenor saxophone
- Charlie Fowlkes – baritone saxophone
- Freddie Green – guitar
- Norman Keenan – double bass
- Rufus Jones – drums
- Grady Tate – drums
