= We Belong Together (Robert & Johnny song) =

Single by Robert & Johnny
- B-side: "Walking in the Rain"
- Released: February 1958
- Genre: Rhythm and blues
- Length: 2:42
- Label: Old Town
- Songwriters: Robert Carr, Johnny Mitchell, Hy Weiss

Robert & Johnny singles chronology
| "Broken Hearted Man" (1957) | "We Belong Together" (1958) | "Marry Me" (1958) |

"We Belong Together" is a 1958 American rhythm and blues hit written and recorded by Robert & Johnny, with a co-writing credit to Hy Weiss. It reached #12 on the R&B charts and #32 on the Billboard Hot 100 chart.

== Cover versions ==
The song was later recorded by several others. The Fleetwoods released a cover version on their 1959 album, Mr. Blue.

A rendition by Ritchie Valens was released in 1959 on the Del-Fi record label and can be found on several of his albums. It is also featured in a scene from the 1987 hit film about Valens, La Bamba, in which the song was sung by Los Lobos.

The Belmonts released a remake on the Laurie label, Laurie 3080, in 1961, after they had split with Dion. It was not a hit, but was later reissued on a collector's label because of its musical value.

In 1961, Jimmy Mullins, known as Jimmy Velvit, recorded it in the Dallas, Texas area. It was issued in January, 1962 on MGM's Cub Records label (K9105). It attracted a lot of attention and airplay and became the #1 song on the Dallas radio station KLIF for six weeks.

A different singer, Jimmy Tennant, using the name Jimmy Velvet, had a #75 hit with the song on the Billboard Hot 100 in 1964. Tennant had initially recorded and released the song on his own Velvet label (co-owned with Ray Curran) in April 1963 (Velvet 201-63), using the same name Mullins was using, Jimmy Velvit. That same issue was briefly re-issued in August, 1963 on the Cortland label's Witch Records subsidiary (#115) in an effort to take the Velvet Records release to a national level. Tennant used another song from the session, "I'm Gonna Try", as the flip side of both releases, the same song the earlier Jimmy Velvit (Jimmy Mullins) had used on his 1962 Cub version. That song had been written by Mullins. The hit release (as by Jimmy Velvet) on ABC-Paramount 10488 used "History Of Love" (recorded at the same April session) as the flip side, which was first issued by November 1963.

Peaches & Herb included the song on their album Let's Fall In Love.

== In popular culture ==
The song was used in the 1983 John Carpenter movie Christine, based on the novel by Stephen King.

The song was used in the 1985 film After Hours directed by Martin Scorsese.

In 2023, the Ritchie Valens version was in the series finale of Riverdale, "Goodbye, Riverdale", in the final scene, which showed Betty Cooper reunite with her friends in the afterlife.
