= Jimmy Powell (singer) =

British Soul and R&B singer (1942–2016)

- Born: 13 August 1942; Selly Oak, Birmingham, England
- Died: 13 May 2016 (aged 73) Blisworth, England
- Genres: soul; Rhythm and blues
- Occupation: singer
- Instrument: Vocals

Jimmy Powell (13 October 1942 – 13 May 2016) was a British soul and rhythm and blues singer who recorded and performed throughout the 1960s and early 1970s, and is best remembered as the lead singer of Jimmy Powell and the 5 Dimensions, a group that briefly included Rod Stewart.

== Early life and career ==
Powell was born in Selly Oak, Birmingham, and attended Turves Green School in the city. He began singing in his teens with a local skiffle group, and then a beat group, the Jumping Jacks, before forming his own band, the Detours, around 1959. In 1961, he became a professional singer when he joined the Rockin' Berries. The group toured and performed in clubs in Germany, including a residency at the Star-Club in Hamburg, before returning to London where they were auditioned by producer Jack Good. Good offered Powell a solo recording contract, and he left the group a few months later. His first record, a cover version of Buster Brown's US rhythm and blues hit "Sugar Babe", with guitar by Big Jim Sullivan and produced by Chris Blackwell, was released by Decca in 1962. It did not chart, and nor did two subsequent singles on Decca, "Tom Hark" (1962) and "Remember Then" (1963). In 1963, Powell moved from Birmingham to London and starting visiting the Marquee Club, where British musicians such as Alexis Korner and Cyril Davies performed. His new manager, Malcolm Nixon, auditioned groups to act as his backing band, and offered the role to the Dimensions.

== Jimmy Powell and the 5 Dimensions ==
The Dimensions were a London-based group formed in 1962 by guitarist Gary Leport, bassist Louis Cennamo, guitarist Peter Mariosa and drummer Brian "Chick" Kattenhorn; in 1963 they added rhythm guitarist Mike Webb and singer and harmonica player Rod Stewart. Leport and Stewart were old school friends, and had played together previously in a north London band, the Raiders, who (without Stewart) subsequently became instrumental group the Moontrekkers and recorded with Joe Meek. With Jimmy Powell joining them as lead singer in 1963, the group changed their name to Jimmy Powell and The 5 Dimensions. They toured Scotland and played club dates in London and elsewhere in England in the autumn of 1963. Stewart became frustrated that he was allowed few opportunities to sing, and left in December 1963. Leport and Webb also left, and the three were replaced by Kenny White and Martin Shaw (guitars), and Pete Hogman (harmonica and supporting vocals).

Jimmy Powell and the 5 Dimensions continued to perform together, becoming a regular attraction at the Crawdaddy Club in Richmond. They signed a recording deal with Pye Records, who released "That's Alright", written by Powell, as a single in June 1964. They were also hired to provide backing for Jamaican singer Millie Small on her recording of "My Boy Lollipop". Later, popular rumours suggested that Rod Stewart played harmonica on the record, but it was in fact played by Pete Hogman. Powell also claimed to have played harmonica on P. J. Proby's hit, "Hold Me". The group appeared on the TV shows Ready Steady Go! and Thank Your Lucky Stars, and live at the All Night Rave at the Alexandra Palace on a bill with The Rolling Stones, John Lee Hooker, John Mayall & the Bluesbreakers and others, before Powell and the group parted company later in the year. Cennamo, Kattenhorn and Hogman, with other musicians, remained together for several months, billed as the 5 Dimensions and working as a backing band for Sister Rosetta Tharpe and Chuck Berry, before themselves splitting up in 1965.

In the meantime, Powell recorded a solo single, a reworked version of "Sugar Babe" on which he was backed by session musicians Jimmy Page (guitar), John Paul Jones (bass) and Clem Cattini (drums). He then formed a new band, also called the Five Dimensions (the two identically-named bands apparently existed simultaneously for several months), which included guitarists Kenny White and Martin Shaw from his old band together with Tim Munns (bass – previously a member of the Rockin' Berries with Powell), B. J. Wilson (drums) (later replaced by Peter Knight), and a keyboard player. They toured the club circuit, but broke up in early 1966.

== Later career ==
In 1966, Powell recruited an existing Manchester group called the Puzzle – Steve Bolton (lead guitar), Alan Stone (bass), Paul Smith (tenor sax) and Mick Green (drums) – and so formed Jimmy Powell and the Dimensions (without the number "Five"). They soon split up, and Powell took over a Coventry band 'Willy's Cult' comprising Dave Fulford (vocals), Rod Godwin (guitar), Willy Morris (bass – later replaced by Tony Lucas), Alan Shepherd (sax, flute), Stan Byers (trumpet), and Tom "Duke" Russell (drums). (Stan Byers is the father of Roddy Radiation, guitarist with the Specials.) They performed together regularly on the British club and university circuit until 1968. They made two singles for Decca "Time Mends Broken Hearts/Unexpected Mirrors" and "I Just Can't Get Over You/Real Cool" recorded at Hollick & Taylor in Birmingham. They were managed at this time by BBC presenter St.John Howell and an appearance on the TV soap The Newcomers followed. A highlight of 1967 was a gig on 2 July at the Savile Theatre, London appearing with Cream, John Mayall, and Jeff Beck/Rod Stewart group. However, according to Bruce Eder at Allmusic, "their singles failed to register with the public despite a high-energy sound strongly reminiscent of the early Stones, solid attack on their instruments... and a good feel for the blues." Powell continued to record, at first on the short-lived Strike label set up by writer and producer Miki Dallon and, from 1967, back at Decca where he released three singles in 1967–68.

Powell formed a new version of the Dimensions in 1968, with Ray Spiteri (guitar), Bob Spiteri (bass) and Derek Bunt (drums). They performed in Germany and on the UK college circuit. Powell released four singles in 1969–70, again without success, on the Young Blood label, also established by Dallon. He also recorded two albums for the label, Come On Down To My House (1969) and Hold On (1973, released in Germany), most of the songs on which were self-penned.

Later in the 1970s, Powell worked as the part-time manager of a furniture company, as well as performing in pubs with a band, the Survivors. In the 1990s he moved to live in Leighton Buzzard, Bedfordshire, and established a successful car park management business.

Compilation CDs of Powell's recordings with the Dimensions and as a solo artist have included The R'n'B Sensation (See for Miles, 1992) and Sugar Babe (Castle Music, 2003). Another compilation, Progressive Talking Blues, was issued in 2007.

== Death ==
Powell died in 2016 at his home in Blisworth, Northamptonshire.

== Discography ==
=== Singles ===
==== Solo ====
- "Sugar Babe Part 1" b/w "Sugar Babe Part 2" (1962), Decca F11447
- "Tom Hark" b/w "Dance Her By Me" (1962), Decca F11544
- "Remember Then" b/w "Everyone But You" (1963), Decca 11570

==== With the Five Dimensions ====
- "That's Alright" b/w "I'm Looking For A Woman" (1963), Pye 7N 15663
- "Sugar Babe" b/w "I've Been Watching You" (1964) Pye 7N 15735
- "I Can Go Down" b/w "Love Me Right" (1966) Strike JH 309
- "Unexpected Mirrors" b/w "Time Mends Broken Hearts" (1967) Decca F12664
- "I Just Can't Get Over You b/w "Real Cool" (1968) Decca F1275
- "I Can Go Down" b/w "Captain Man (1969), Young Blood YB 1002
- "House of the Rising Sun" b/w "That's Love" (1969) Young Blood YB 1006
- "Sugar Man" b/w "Slow Down" (1969) Young Blood YB 1008

=== Albums ===
- Come On Down to My House (1969), Young Blood
- Hold On (1973), Young Blood

Compilations

- The R'n'B Sensation (1992), See For Miles
- Sugar Babe (2003), Castle Music
- Progressive Talking Blues (2007), MDP OMP
