= The Fiestas =

American rhythm and blues brand (1958–2003)

The Fiestas were an American rhythm and blues musical group from Newark, New Jersey, United States.

The group was organized in 1958. The Fiestas contracted with Old Town Records in 1959, after the company's owner, Hy Weiss, overheard the group singing in a bathroom adjacent to his office in Harlem. Their debut single was 1959's "So Fine", written by their guitarist Frank Ingalls, Samuel Ingalls' brother. The song was a hit in the U.S. It reached number 3 on the R&B Singles chart and number 11 on the Billboard Hot 100, with "Last Night I Dreamed" on the flip side. A series of soul singles followed from the group, among them "You Could Be My Girlfriend", "Anna", and "Think Smart", but only 1962's "Broken Heart" managed to chart, scoring number 18 on the R&B Singles chart.

Ending their relationship with Old Town, the group later recorded for the Strand and Vigor labels, releasing music into the mid-1970s.

"So Fine" later featured in the video game LittleBigPlanet 3.

The group's last television appearance was on the PBS showcase (Rock at 50) recorded in May 2003, where they sang "So Fine" at the Benedum Center for the Performing Arts.

== Members ==
- Tommy Bullock – deceased
- Eddie Morris – deceased
- Sam Ingalls – deceased
- Preston Lane – died October 27, 2006, at the age of 67
- Bobby Moore
- George Bullock
- Randy Stewart
- Kenneth Hopper
- Wendell Scott
- Wayne Parham
