= Robert & Johnny =

American R&B duo

- Origin: The Bronx, New York, U.S.
- Genres: Doo-wop
- Years active: 1950s–1960s
- Label: Old Town
- Past members: Robert Carr; Johnny Mitchell

Robert & Johnny were an American doo-wop duo from The Bronx, composed of Robert Carr and Johnny Mitchell.

== Biography ==
The duo released about a dozen singles for Old Town Records in the late 1950s and early 1960s. Two of them charted: "We Belong Together", which hit number 12 on the U.S. R&B Singles chart and number 32 on the Billboard Hot 100 in 1958, and "I Believe In You", which hit number 93 on the Hot 100 later that year. They wrote most of their own songs, and were distinguished by their vocal style, which Richie Unterberger has described as "one smoky, one nasal".

Johnny was born John Naylon Banks, Jr. in the Bronx on December 16, 1936, to John Naylon Banks, Sr. and Marion Elizabeth Mitchell. Johnny’s parents divorced when he was a small child. His father, an optician from Texas, remarried and lived for many years in Montclair, New Jersey. His mother, born in Georgia, remarried and raised a family in Jamaica, Queens. Young Johnny was brought up by his maternal grandfather and step-grandmother in the Bronx and took his mother’s family name.

Robert Lee Carr was born on February 10, 1938, in Fort Lauderdale, Florida, to William and Eliza (Lane) Carr. After the war, the Carr family migrated north and settled in the Bronx.

Robert died on May 18, 1993, at the age of 55. Johnny died on March 16, 1995, at the age of 58.

== Cover versions of "We Belong Together" ==
- Ritchie Valens (1959)
- The Belmonts (1960)
- Jimmy Velvit (1961)
- Jimmy Velvet (1962)
- Peaches & Herb
- Los Lobos (1987)
