= Marek Bliziński =

Polish jazz guitarist and composer

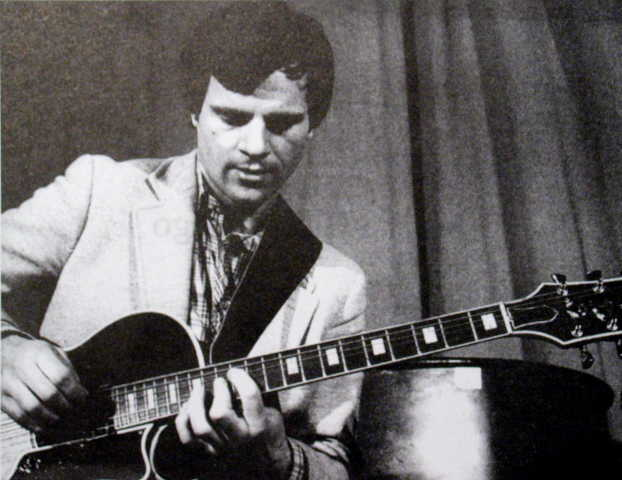
- Jazz guitarist Marek Bliziński

Background information
- Born: March 22, 1947; Warsaw, Poland
- Died: March 17, 1989 (aged 41) Warsaw
- Genres: Jazz, pop, rock
- Occupation: Musician
- Instrument: Guitar
- Years active: 1960–1988

Marek Bliziński (22 March 1947 – 17 March 1989) was a Polish jazz guitarist and composer. He played with Michał Urbaniak, Wojciech Karolak and Zbigniew Namysłowski.

Bliziński was the first Polish world-class jazz guitarist. Stylistically, he belonged to the jazz mainstream, continuing the tradition of electric jazz guitar started by Charlie Christian and represented later by musicians such as Kenny Burrell, Barney Kessel, Wes Montgomery, Jim Hall, Joe Pass, Pat Metheny, and John Scofield.

== Career ==
Bliziński grew up in a family with strong cultural traditions. He got hit first guitar on Christmas 1962 and taught himself how to play. He founded the band Czterech (The Four) in 1966, where he played the music of J.S. Bach transcribed for three guitars and drums. The band won the Igrce Gliwickie competition in 1967; Bliziński won the first prize in the instrumental category. He wrote in one of his letters:

I learned a lot while working with this band. I developed my technique and started to pay more respect to time: tempo and precision in rhythm; most of all however, I learned inner discipline ― indispensable in self-development.

In 1971 he was already collaborating with Krzysztof Sadowski and Wanda Warska. He founded the quartet Generacja ("Generation"), which won a prize in the Jazz nad Odrą festival; Bliziński himself won the 3rd prize in the instrumental category. In the years that followed, he played with Zbigniew Namysłowski, Michał Urbaniak, Tomasz Stańko, Jan Jarczyk, Włodzimierz Nahorny, Adam Makowicz, Novi, Bemibek, the Polish Radio's Jazz Studio conducted by Jan "Ptaszyn" Wróblewski, the Polish Radio and Television orchestra conducted by A. Trzaskowski, Wojciech Karolak and Janusz Muniak.

Bliziński's technique was dazzling. He worked very hard, practising constantly, aiming at maximal precision. He started his own trio in the late 70s, with which he played in jazz clubs and recorded his first album, The Wave (Poljazz). When the Jazz Forum magazine held a contest in 1982, Bliziński attracted the highest number of votes in the jazz guitar category. In the following years, Marek Bliziński and Jarosław Śmietana became the two most popular jazz guitar players in Poland.

Bliziński was recruited by Zbigniew Namysłowski in 1983. He played with Air Condition on jazz festivals in Europe and Canada. Johnny Olson wrote in the Swedish paper Nya Wermlands-Tidningen on April 26, 1983:

Shocking. I was knocked out by his strikingly good guitar playing. He stands still as a statue, with no expression on his face but with what seems to be a direct connection between his brain and guitar. His playing reveals sound knowledge of guitar improvisation history. On four bars distance he went up to his knees in blues mud, somewhere in the Mississippi delta, rendered guitar canons of the 1950s and finally sailed across some funk patterns of the kind that make you feel dizzy. Technical problems seem to be totally unknown to him. He swings strongly when he wants to. Whatever he does, he does it with a temporal precision sharp as a razor. A noteworthy man: one of the best I've ever heard, and I've heard quite a few in my life.

Despite releasing popular records with other musicians, Bliziński's solo records had little success. Disappointed with imperfect recordings, he used all his savings for instruments and his own recording studio. He started working with his fellow musicians for the Royal Viking lines. Between cruises, he worked on his next solo album.

He was a universal guitarist and a good bass guitar player. His playing was characterized by perfect technique, moderation and good taste. As a soloist, he represented gentle virtuosity, free from cheap tricks, preferring full sound and a natural use of the instrument. Kazimierz Czyż wrote:

His playing is characterised by a synthesis of focus and a unique selection of sounds. He never performs with the aim of showing off, in a manner where fingers are faster than thought; instead, he is always focused and seems to play for himself, without attempting to boast. It's probably this introvert approach to performing that makes him almost unnoticeable; there is only his music on the stage.

He was an appraised theoretician. Taciturn and not particularly communicative in person, he was vastly knowledgeable. He published the book Jazz Guitar in 1983. This compendium of knowledge about guitar playing was complemented by his teaching experience, gained during jazz workshops in Chodzież and Mąchocice.

He occasionally collaborated with the Jazz Forum and Jazz magazines, writing reviews of records and books related to jazz guitar.

== Illness ==
Hardly anybody knew about Bliziński's illness. He underwent an operation for skin cancer in 1985, which seemed to be a success. He was strongly advised to avoid the sun. He went on another cruise in 1988. Many months spent on sea had a negative effect on him. He started losing moral support, fell into depression and became weaker and weaker. Two weeks before the end of a cruise near Jamaica, the doctor on board ordered his immediate return home.

In a Warsaw hospital he was diagnosed with dangerous metastases of an advanced cancer. He died three months later in a hospital in Potocka street in Warsaw, six days before his 42nd birthday.

Original text from note "About author", written by Janusz Popławski, from the book Gitara Jazzowa (Jazz Guitar). Publication approved by the author.

== Discography ==
- Bemowe Frazy (Bemibem, 1974)
- Question Mark, Janusz Muniak Quartet (1978)
- Flyin' Lady, Jan Ptaszyn Wróblewski (1978)
- Wave (Poljazz, 1980)
- Z Lotu Ptaka (1980)
- Dla ciebie jestem sobą with Ewa Bem (Poljazz, 1987)
- Constellation, Ryszard Szeremeta (1988)
