= The Mello-Moods =

The Mello-Moods were an American R&B musical ensemble, operating from the late 1940s to mid-1950s.

Composed of teenagers from Resurrection Catholic School in Harlem, the group's music was focused on an adult market. After the band broke up in 1953, Baylor, Owens and Williams went on to join another band, The Solitaires.

== Members ==
Raymond "Buddy" Wooten, lead (August 31, 1935 – April 12, 2006)

Robert "Bobby/Schubie" Williams, second tenor/piano (c. 1936 – mid 1961)

Monteith P. Owens, first tenor/baritone and guitar (March 31, 1936 – March 3, 2011)

Alvin "Bobby" Baylor, second tenor/baritone (October 27, 1935 – January 4, 1989)

James Bethea, bass (born 1935)

== Discography ==
The group released four records: two on the Red Robin label, and two on Prestige Records.

- "How Could You" / "Where Are You (Now That I Need You)", Red Robin (105), released 1951. The B-side reached number seven on the US Billboard R&B chart in 1952 and, according to Joel Whitburn, original copies have the highest cash value, $2000, of any record ever making the R&B chart.
- "I Couldn't Sleep a Wink Last Night", Red Robin (104), released 1952
- "Call on Me", Prestige Records (799), recorded in 1952, released 1952
- "I'm Lost", Prestige Records (852), recorded in 1952, released 1953
