= Jimmy Velvit =

American singer-songwriter

- Born: January 11, 1941 (age 85)
- Origin: Coalgate, Oklahoma/Dallas, Texas
- Genres: Rock and roll, R&B, C&W
- Occupations: Singer, songwriter, musician, record producer, entertainment promoter
- Instruments: Vocals, guitar
- Years active: 1961–present
- Labels: Cub Records; Bell Records; Tear Drop Records; Abnak Records; Collectables Records; Seduction Records; Alta Records; Division Records; Various Indie labels
- Website: Jimmy Velvit's Website

James Mullins (born January 11, 1941), better known as Jimmy Velvit, is an American rock and roll singer, who began his career in the 1960s. He is originally from Coalgate, Oklahoma, later from Dallas, Texas. He is best known for recording a white rhythm and blues version, in 1962, of Robert & Johnny's 1958 hit "We Belong Together". Velvit's first release was "Sometimes at Night" on Division Records in 1961, afterwards released on Cub Records (a division of M-G-M). He also recorded under the name 'James Bell', in 1968, when he charted "He Ain't Country", a Country & Western release, for Bell Records.

In 2001, his album Sun Sea and Sand (Seduction SCD-103) was nominated for a Grammy Award. Velvit was still recording and performing as of 2021.

== Discography ==
45 RPM Singles (listed in alphabetical order by label) (incomplete)

- Donna/Her Love – Abnak Records 108 – 1965
- That's All I Got From You (with Bobby Hendricks)/I Got A Feeling – Alta Records 108 – 1963
- Sometimes I Wonder/My Heart Is in Your Hands – Alta Records 109 - 1963
- Woman in Bloom/Let Me Keep Your Love – Bell Records 692 (recorded as Jimmy Velvet) – 1967
- He Ain't Country/A Friendly Place To Cry – Bell Records 710 (recorded as James Bell) – 1968
- The Pretty Boy/Poor Old Me – Bell Records 45,003 (recorded as James Bell) – 1968
- Accused/Come' On John – BI Records 5029 (recorded as Jimmy Velvet)
- Love Is Missing/How Sad Chicago – BI Records 5039 (recorded as Jimmy Velvet)
- California Good Times/Jack Frost Loving Co. – Blue Records PJ-651 (recorded as Jimmy Velvet)
- 180% Me/ Let Me Keep Your Love - Bollman International Records 5004 (recorded as Jimmy Velvet) - 1975
- Lonely Is Another Word For Me/ Undune, The Arab - Bollman International Records 5014 (recorded as Jimmy Velvet) - 1975
- Sometimes at Night/Look At Me – Cub Records – K9100 – 1961
- We Belong Together/I'm Gonna Try – Cub Records – K9105 – 1962
- Sometimes at Night/Look At Me – Division Records 102 – 1961
- Gotta Lotta Women/I Can't Help It, I Love You – Shane Records 40 – 1963
- Wisdom of a Fool/I Want To Be Loved – Startime Records – S-103 - 1964
- Don't Go Near A Woman/Hey Nashville - Tear Drop Records TD-3353 (recorded as Jimmy Velvet) - 1977
- Drinking Champagne/I Like Her There – Tear Drop Records TD-3383 (recorded as Jimmy Velvet) – 1977
- Old Lonesome Me - Detroit City/King Of The Road - Crazy Arms - Tear Drop Records TD-3395 (recorded as Jimmy Velvet) - 1977

Albums

- JIMMY VELVET "COUNTRY" – Tear Drop Records TD 2067 LP (recorded as Jimmy Velvet) – 1977
- Bitches I Have Known – Seduction Records SCD-101 CD
- Rockin' With Velvit...the 1960s – Seduction Records SCD-102 CD
- Sun Sea And Sand – Seduction Records SCD-103 CD
- Paranormal Events – Derrick Records DRC-1003 CD
- Jimmy Velvit – The Original – Collectables Records COL-5530 CD
- The Best of JIMMY VELVIT – Key-Loc Records CD
- River Bottom Blues – Seduction Records SCD-131
- He Ain't Country – (Jimmy Velvit/James Bell) Seduction Records SCD-128

Compilation albums (albums including at least one Jimmy Velvit track)

- Sounds Like Elvis VA, Collectables COL-5700 (Mystery Train & Rockin' With Elvis Tonight)
- Big 'D' Rock – Vol One, VA Collectables COL-5553 (Rockin' With Elvis Tonight)
- Big 'D' Rock – Vol Two, VA Collectables COL-5554 (Look at Me)
- Super Rare Doo-Wops – Vol One, VA (Wisdom of A Fool)
- Rare 60's – Collection of Texas Artists, VA Collector's Choice (We Belong Together)
- Merry Christmas From Texas VA Texas B Records (I'll Be Home For Christmas/Santa's Got The Blues/Blue Christmas)

CD singles

- 2000 President Elect Blues – Derrick Records DRC-2000

== Sources ==
- Osborne Record Guide (Osborne, Jerry, Fifteenth Edition, 2001)
- CD liner notes from "Jimmy Velvit – The Original" Collectables Records, 1995
- CD liner notes from "Rockin' With Velvit...the 1960s" Seduction Records, 2000
- Dallas Public Library
- KBOX Radio Chart/Survey Archives
- Dallas Times Herald
- Texas Music Industry Directory (published by The Texas Music Office) Office of the Governor, Austin, Texas
