= Death of Ricky Nelson =

Texas airplane crash (1985)

Rick Nelson's plane crash
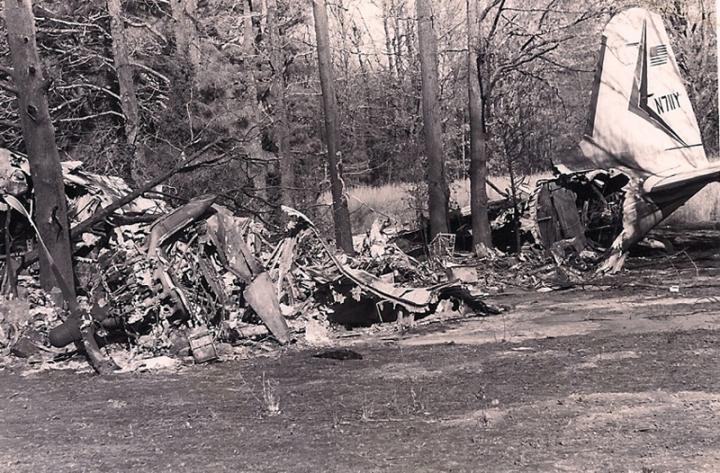
- Wreckage of the plane involved

Occurrence
- Date: December 31, 1985, at 17:14 (CST)
- Summary: In-flight fire
- Site: Near De Kalb, Texas, U.S.

Aircraft
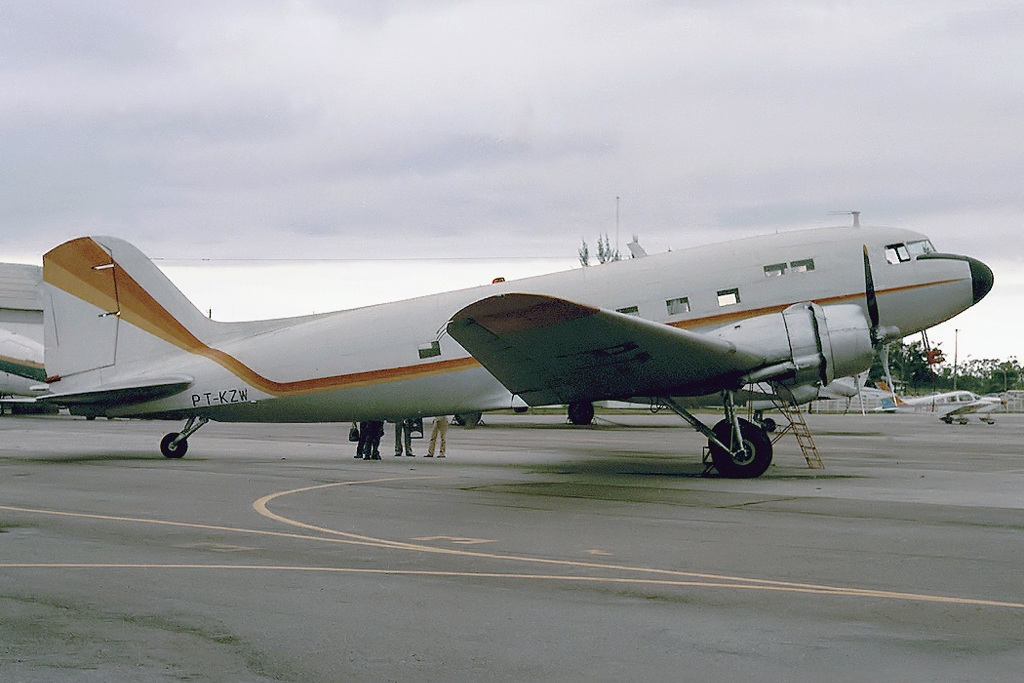
- A privately owned Douglas DC-3, same model of the one involved
- Aircraft type: Douglas DC-3
- Operator: privately owned
- Registration: N711Y
- Flight origin: Guntersville Municipal Airport, Guntersville, Alabama, U.S.
- Destination: Dallas Love Field, Dallas, Texas, U.S.
- Occupants: 9
- Passengers: 7
- Crew: 2
- Fatalities: 7
- Survivors: 2

American pop singer Ricky Nelson died during the crash-landing of his band's aircraft on December 31, 1985. The plane, a Douglas DC-3, was brought down mid-flight outside De Kalb, Texas, by a fire that rapidly spread from a suspected faulty in-cabin heater. Nelson and six others—including several band members and his girlfriend—were killed in the accident. Both pilots survived.

== Background ==
Nelson launched his musical career as a teenager on The Adventures of Ozzie and Harriet, the television show hosted by his parents. He scored a string of pop, rock and country hit songs in the 1960s, but his career stalled in the 1970s. In 1985, Nelson was on a comeback tour.

Nelson dreaded flying but refused to travel by bus. In May 1985, he decided he needed a private plane and paid $118,000 for a 14-seat 1944 Douglas DC-3 (N711Y) that had once belonged to the DuPont family and later to Jerry Lee Lewis. After Nelson took ownership of the plane, it was plagued by mechanical problems. In one incident, Nelson's band was forced to push the plane off the runway after an engine failed. On a separate occasion, in September 1985, a malfunctioning ignition magneto prevented the plane from flying, meaning that Nelson could not participate in the first Farm Aid concert in Champaign, Illinois.

== Accident ==
On December 26, 1985, Nelson and the band left for a three-stop tour of the southern U.S. Following shows in Orlando, Florida, and Guntersville, Alabama, Nelson and other band members took off from Guntersville for a New Year's Eve celebration in Dallas. At approximately 5:14 p.m. CST on December 31, the plane crash-landed outside of De Kalb, Texas, northeast of Dallas, in a cow pasture less than 2 miles (3.2 km) from a landing strip, hitting trees on its way down. Seven of the nine occupants were killed.

=== Fatalities ===
Seven people were killed in the crash:

- Rick Nelson, 45
- Helen Blair (Nelson’s fiancée), 28
- Sound technician Donald "Clark" Russell, 35
- The Stone Canyon Band (Nelson's backing group):
  - Andy Chapin, 33, pianist
  - Ricky Intveld, 22, drummer
  - Bobby Neal, 38, guitarist
  - Patrick Woodward, 35, bassist

Survivors:

- Pilot In Command (PIC): Brad Rank, 34
- Co-pilot Kenneth Ferguson, 40

== Investigation of incident ==
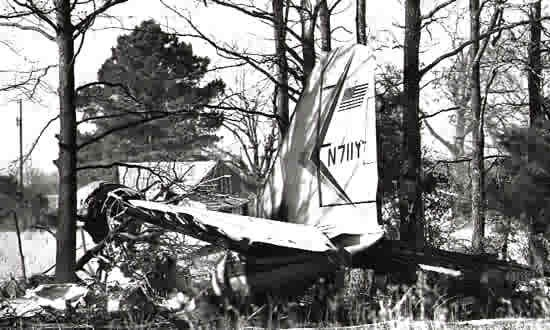
The wreckage of the plane seen from another angle

Reports vary as to whether the plane was on fire before it crashed, though some witnesses attested that it was indeed in flames while still airborne. However, National Transportation Safety Board (NTSB) chairman Jim Burnett said that although the plane was filled with smoke, it landed and came to a stop before it was swallowed by flames. The NTSB conducted a year-long investigation and finally concluded that, while a definite cause was still unknown, the crash was probably the result of a fire that was caused by the plane's gasoline-powered cabin heater "acting up".

=== Pilots questioned ===
When questioned by the NTSB, pilots Brad Rank and Ken Ferguson had different accounts of key events. According to Ferguson, the cabin heater was acting up after the plane took off. Ferguson said that Rank repeatedly went to the back of the plane to try to fix the heater, and that Rank told Ferguson several times to turn the heater back on. "One of the times, I refused to turn it on," said Ferguson. He continued, "I was getting more nervous. I didn't think we should be messing with that heater en route." After the plane crashed, Ferguson and Rank climbed out through the cockpit windows, suffering extensive burns. They shouted to the passenger cabin, but there was no response. Ferguson and Rank backed away from the plane, fearing an explosion. Ferguson stated that Rank told him, "Don't tell anyone about the heater, don't tell anyone about the heater."

However, Rank told a different story. He said that he was checking on the passengers when he noticed smoke in the middle of the cabin, where Nelson and Blair were sitting. Even though he never mentioned a problematic heater, Rank stated that he went to the rear of the plane to check the heater, saw no smoke, and found that the heater was cool to the touch. He said that after activating an automatic fire extinguisher and opening the cabin's fresh-air inlets, he returned to the cockpit, where Ferguson was already asking air traffic controllers for directions to the nearest airfield.

Rank was criticized by the NTSB for not following the in-flight fire checklist, opening the fresh air vents instead of leaving them closed, not instructing the passengers to use supplemental oxygen and not attempting to fight the fire with the handheld fire extinguisher that was in the cockpit. The board said that while these steps might not have prevented the crash, "they would have enhanced the potential for survival of the passengers." The words of the NTSB seemed to echo those of firefighter Lewis Glover, one of the first on the scene, who stated, "All the bodies are there at the front of the plane. Apparently, they were trying to escape the fire."

=== Suspected cause ===
An examination indicated that a fire had originated on the right side of the aft cabin area at or near the floorline. Early reports speculated that the passengers were killed when the aircraft struck obstacles during the forced landing, but that is refuted by both the NTSB report criticizing the pilots for not assisting the passengers as well as the firefighters' report, which states that all of the passengers were at the front of the aircraft attempting to exit the plane. The ignition and fuel sources of the fire could not be determined. According to another report, the pilot indicated that the crew repeatedly tried to turn on the cabin heater shortly before the fire occurred, but that it failed to respond. After the fire, the access panel to the heater compartment was found unlatched. In an episode of Celebrity Ghost Stories, Ricky’s daughter Tracy told the story of her parents' haunted house that ultimately led to the death of her father.

== Burial ==
Nelson's remains were misdirected in transit from Texas to California, delaying the funeral for several days. On January 6, 1986, 250 mourners entered the Church of the Hills in Los Angeles for funeral services while 700 fans gathered outside. Attendees included Colonel Tom Parker, Connie Stevens, Angie Dickinson, and dozens of actors, writers and musicians. Nelson was privately buried days later at the Forest Lawn cemetery.

== Aftermath ==
Nelson's ex-wife, Kristin Nelson, threatened to sue the Nelson family for her former husband's life insurance money and tried to gain control of his estate from David Nelson, its administrator. Her bid was rejected by a Los Angeles Superior Court judge. David Nelson made sure that the children of Kris and Rick were taken care of. Only days after the funeral, rumors and newspaper reports erroneously suggested that cocaine freebasing was among several possible causes of the plane crash. Those allegations were refuted by the National Transportation Safety Board (NTSB) following its investigation.

== Sources ==
- Bashe, Philip (1992). Teenage Idol, Travelin' Man: The Complete Biography of Rick Nelson. New York: Hyperion Books. ISBN 1-56282-969-6.
