= Walking Along =

Single by the Solitaires
- B-side: "Please Kiss This Letter"
- Released: 1957
- Recorded: 1957
- Genre: Doo wop
- Length: 2:15
- Label: Argo
- Songwriters: Milton Love; Winston Willis; Bobby Baylor; Monte Owens; Pat Gaston

"Walking Along" is a song recorded by the American doo wop group the Solitaires in 1957. The group members are individually credited on the Argo Records single release as the songwriters. The single was their best selling record. This song features the percussion sounds impersonating people walking in rhythm, first heard in the introduction, as well as the verses, and in between the repeated choruses and the coda. The Diamonds recorded the song in 1958 and it reached number 29 on the singles chart on October 27, 1958. Their single, released by Mercury Records, credits the song to Sam Weiss and Winston Willis.
