= The Earls =

American music group

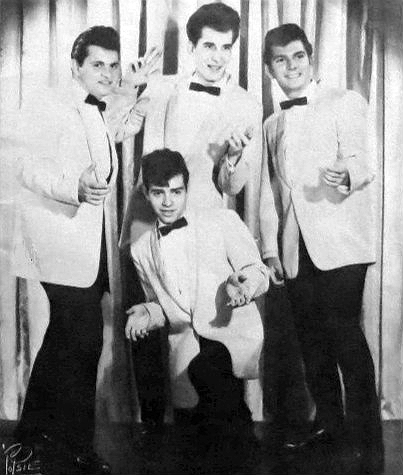
- The Earls in 1962

Background information
- Also known as: Larry Chance and the Earls
- Origin: The Bronx, New York, U.S.
- Genre: Doo-wop
- Years active: 1960–present
- Labels: Rome Records; Old Town Records; ABC Records; Woodbury Records; London Records (Canada)
- Spinoffs: The Earls Road, Production Crew
- Members: Bobby Tribuzio; Chuck Mearizo; Vito Garcia
- Past members: Larry Chance: Tony Parisi; Jack Wray; Eddie Harder; Bobby Del-Din; Mike Mone; Larry Palumbo; Ronnie Calabrese; Art Loria; Chris Cassone; George Tuzzeo; T. J. Butch Barbella; Bobby Coleman; Elliot Kritzer; Daniel Loria; Anthony Tribuzio; Ken Arvidson
- Website: larrychanceandtheearls.com

The Earls, often credited as Larry Chance and the Earls, is an American popular music group formed in The Bronx, New York. In a career spanning over 60 years they formed in the early 1960s, though their roots can be traced back to 1957 in a group called the High-Hatters. They were one of the most accomplished white doo-wop groups of the early 1960s, especially in their home state of New York. In 1962, they became known for their signature hit single "Remember Then", which still remains a staple of doo-wop music. Later in their career they experienced moderate success with songs such as "Life Is But a Dream", "Never" and "I Believe". In the 1970s and 1980s, an oldies revival scene began and the Earls re-experienced success and became one of the most requested popular groups in the doo-wop genre. The group still continues to perform.

Other recordings include "Looking For My Baby" and "Kissing." Albums included Remember Me Baby, The Earls: Today, The Earls – Live, Earl Change, and Streets of the Bronx.

Since the group's inception in the early 1960s, singer Larry Chance fronted and led the Earls, being the sole continuous and only original remaining member of the group, until his death in 2023.

== History ==
The Earls are one of the New York City doo-wop success stories. Discovered singing on the street corner in front of subway station, the Earls took the original black doo-wop street corner harmony sound, and refined and expanded it for new audiences. The Earls were known for their "Baby Talk" styling of their background harmony riffs.

Larry Chance was the driving creative force since the group's formation and success. Chance grew up in Philadelphia and attended high school with Chubby Checker, Frankie Avalon, and Danny Rapp of Danny & the Juniors. But it was not until 1957 that he moved with his parents to the Bronx after high school, that his musical career took off.

Chance formed a group at the Tecumsa Social Club, known as the Hi-Hatters. The group would later become the Earls and was originally composed of Chance, Bob Del Din, Eddie Harder, Larry Palombo and John Wray. In 1961, Larry Palombo died in a military-related skydiving accident; he was around 17 or 18 years old.

In 1961, Rome released their debut record – "Life is But a Dream" (Rome 101 – 1961) b/w "It's You" (and in the late 1970s released with "Whoever You Are" as the B-side). The group then performed with Murray the K and on Dick Clark's American Bandstand show. They released another record that year, "Looking For My Baby" (Rome 102) b/w "Cross My Heart".

In 1962, the group hooked up with Stan Vincent and recorded "Remember Then" for Old Town Records (Old Town 1130) b/w "Let's Waddle". It was a hit, peaking at No. 24 on the US Billboard Hot 100 chart in 1963 and also No. 24 in Canada . Chance co-wrote the group's next single "Never" b/w "I Keep A-Tellin You" (Old Town 1133–1963). The group scored another hit in 1963 on Old Town with "Eyes" b/w "Look My Way" (Old Town 1141). Later, a demo "I Believe" was released (Old Town 1149–1963) b/w "Don't Forget". "I Believe" became a much bigger record from the 1970s onward as it received airplay on New York oldies radio.

Chance later had a brief solo career, recording "Let Them Talk". He returned to the Earls who, at that time, had two new members – Bob Moricco and Ronnie Calabrese. The group started playing their own musical instruments and, in 1967, recorded "If I Could Do It Over" b/w "Papa" (Mr. G 801 – 1967), and a track for ABC Records, "Its Been a Long Time Coming" b/w "In My Lonely Room" (ABC 11109–1967).

The group continued performing into the 1970s and, in 1977, they released a disco version of the Velvets' "Tonight (Could Be the Night)." By 1983, the group members were Chance, Ronnie Calabrese, Colon Rello, Bobby Tribuzio and Tony Obert, and they recorded Larry Chance and the Earls – Today.

From 1989 to 1993, the group consisted of: Larry Chance, Bobby Tribuzio, Bob Coleman, Art Loria (formerly of the Belmonts) and T.J. Barbella. This roster continued a busy performance schedule and studio works. In 1989, they were on Broadway performing in the original production of A Bronx Tale, a one-man play by Chazz Palminteri. They recorded the theme song of the production "Streets of the Bronx", which was slated to appear on the soundtrack of the motion picture A Bronx Tale, however a different version of the song was eventually chosen. Two albums were released: Larry Chance and the Earls (Live!) and Earl Change. They were nominated as "Best Musical Act" in Atlantic City for their eight-week run at The Claridge Hotel, starring with Sal Richards.

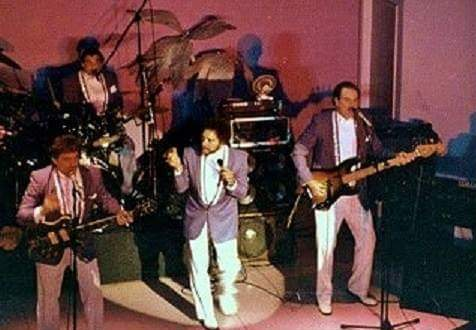
Larry Chance and the Earls performing live in Florida – 1995. (L-R) Art Loria, Bobby T, Larry Chance, Bob Coleman

Loria and Barbella left the group in 1993. Chance, Tribuzio and Coleman remained as the group's core with a rotation of members rounding out the act. They continued to perform and record and were considered to be popular on the doo wop / oldies revival circuit.

In 2008, the group was honored with a place on The Bronx Walk of Fame.

Former member Art Loria died on October 23, 2010. He performed and recorded with the group for eight years in the late 1980s and early 1990s. He was the co-writer with Barbella of the group's tribute to Presley, "Elvis: He's Alive". The song was recognized by Billboard magazine and BMI and the group was presented with an award for recognition of a song worthy to keep an ear out for. Larry Chance later went on to record "Elvis: He's Alive" on his solo album, Larry Chance Sings Country.

Original bassist and baritone, John "Jack" Wray (born June 19, 1939) died on November 30, 2020, at the age of 81.

Bobby Coleman, a 35-year member of the Earls, died unexpectedly on December 7, 2020.

Larry Chance died on September 6, 2023, at the age of 82.
