= Cub Records =

American record label

- Parent company: Metro-Goldwyn-Mayer
- Founded: 1958
- Status: Defunct
- Distributor: MGM Records
- Genre: Rhythm and blues
- Country of origin: United States

Cub Records was an American record label, and a subsidiary of MGM Records, which started in 1958 for rhythm and blues releases.

Artists who released records on Cub included the Impalas ("Sorry (I Ran All the Way Home)"), Jimmy Jones ("Handy Man", "Good Timin'"), the Stereos ("I Really Love You"), and Jimmy Velvit ("Sometimes At Night", "We Belong Together"). The label lasted until 1968.

== See also ==
- List of record labels
