= The Solitaires =

US musical group

- The Solitaires in 1954. Top row: Herman Curtis, Pat Gaston, Bobby Baylor. Bottom row: Bobby Williams, Buzzy Willis.

Background information
- Origin: Harlem, New York City, US
- Genres: Doo-wop
- Years active: 1953–2019
- Labels: Old Town; Argo
- Past members: Nick Anderson; Reggie Barnes; Freddy Barksdale; Bobby Baylor; Herman Curtis; Pat Gaston; Cecil Holmes; California Jones; George Magnezid; Robbie Mansfield; Roland Martinez; Cathy Miller; Angel Morgan; Monte Owens; Wally Roker; Bobby Williams; Harriet Williams; Buzzy Willis; Milton Love; Frank Morrow; Alvin Grant; Don Cruz; Ray Goodwin

The Solitaires were an American doo-wop group, best known for their 1957 song "Walking Along". Although they never had a national chart hit, they were one of the most popular vocal groups in New York in the late 1950s.

== History ==
The Solitaires formed in Harlem in 1953. They started as a street-corner singing group, one of many that used to congregate on 142nd Street. The original lineup consisted of Eddie "California" Jones (lead singer), Nick Anderson (first tenor), Winston "Buzzy" Willis (second tenor), Rudy "Angel" Morgan (baritone), and Pat Gaston (bass).

=== Old Town Records: 1954–1963 ===
==== Herman Curtis ====
After a series of personnel changes, the group had six members: Herman Curtis, also known as Herman Dunham (lead singer/first tenor), Buzzy Willis (second tenor), Pat Gaston (bass), Monteith "Monte" Owens (tenor/guitar), Bobby Baylor (second tenor/baritone) and Bobby "Schubie" Williams (tenor/piano). Curtis had previously performed with the Vocaleers, Gaston with the Four Bells, Willis with the Crows, and Owens, Baylor and Williams with the Mello-Moods.

Willis happened to work for Hal Jackson, a famous disc jockey and radio personality at WLIB. With Jackson's help, the Solitaires landed an audition with record producer Hy Weiss in the fall of 1953. Weiss used to hold auditions in a local movie theater after it had closed for the night. Weiss was impressed with the young men's vocals. Just teenagers at the time, the Solitaires wrote most of their own material and had their own style of harmony, which helped distinguish them from the other street-corner singers. The group was signed to the Old Town record label, from which they issued a series of singles that included "Wonder Why", "Blue Valentine", and a cover version of the jazz standard "I Don't Stand a Ghost of a Chance with You". It was during this period that the group's best known publicity photo was taken, showing Curtis, Gaston, Baylor, Williams and Willis in white jackets procured for them by their manager at the time, Maurice Hines (father of the noted actor and dancer Gregory Hines).

==== Milton Love ====
When Curtis left the group to join the air force in 1955, he was replaced by Milton Love (formerly of the Concords). It was with Love that the Solitaires enjoyed their greatest success. Love had taken voice lessons as a child, and had released a single with the Concords while still in high school, writing the lyrics and singing the lead on both sides. With the Concords he had also sung backup on a single with Pearl Reaves ("You Can't Stay Here"/"I'm Not Ashamed") which had done well locally. The Solitaires had a string of local hits throughout the latter part of the 1950s that included "The Wedding" (1955), "The Angels Sang" (1956), and their biggest hit, "Walking Along" (1957). Bass singer Freddy Barksdale joined the group in 1956 when Pat Gaston also joined the air force. Curtis rejoined the group when time permitted and sang lead on a few more songs, including "Please Kiss This Letter" and "Thrill of Love".

Meanwhile the group performed regularly to sold-out crowds in venues along the East Coast and in Canada, including the Apollo Theater in Harlem, the Howard Theater in Washington, D.C., and shows hosted by Alan Freed, Hal Jackson, and Dr. Jive. In 1955 they performed at the Second Annual Festival of Negro Music at the Savoy Ballroom. Their songs received regular airplay and developed a loyal fan base among R&B lovers. When they performed their song "The Wedding" and its sequel, "The Honeymoon", Love would wear a mop on his head to play the part of the bride.

In 1959 the Solitaires were booked to play at the Paramount in Manhattan along with Frankie Avalon, Buddy Holly, and the Big Bopper. They never got to meet Holly or the Big Bopper, as both were killed in a plane crash that February.

=== Other labels ===
The group disbanded temporarily in 1961 when Milton Love joined the army for two years. Although they were popular in New York and several of their singles had been regional hits, they had not had a national chart hit. This was likely due to poor distribution by Old Town. Their signature song, "Walking Along", was a local chart hit in the New York area in 1957. When a white group, the Diamonds, covered it in 1958, it reached No. 29 on the Billboard Hot 100. The Solitaires then made some additional sales by re-releasing their version with Argo Records. A last Old Town single, recorded a few years earlier, was released in 1963.

The group released three more singles under other labels in 1964. Calling themselves the Cadillacs, the group backed up Ray Brewster in "Fool", released by Arctic. They recorded another single as the Chances, "Through a Long and Sleepless Night", released by Roulette. Their last single as the Solitaires was "Fool That I Am", released by MGM.

=== Later years ===
Various Solitaires lineups have toured since 1961. For several years the group was made up of Milton Love, Freddy Barksdale, George Magnezid and Robbie Mansfield. (Both Magnezid and Mansfield formerly sang with the Wrens.) The group performed at United in Group Harmony Association concerts and other venues in the 1990s. In 2012 their lineup consisted of Milton Love, Alvin Grant, Don Cruz, and Ray Goodwin. As recently as Labor Day 2014 the group was performing in the New Jersey area.

The current and former members have pursued a variety of careers in and out of the music industry. Milton Love became a medical technician. Notably, Pat Gaston, formerly a high school dropout, eventually earned a doctorate in clinical psychology.

Robert "Bobby/Schubie" Williams died in 1961, due to a blood disease.

Bobby Baylor died on January 4, 1989.

George Magnezid died on December 9, 2003.

Eddie "California" Jones died on August 24, 2008.

Herman Dunham (known as Herman Curtis) died on February 1, 2010, due to lung cancer.

Monte Owens died on March 3, 2011, in the Bronx, New York, after illness, at the age of 74.

Freddy Barksdale died from diabetes and chronic kidney disease on June 25, 2015.

Ray Goodwin died from cancer in December, 2022.

In 1984, the Murray Hill Company released a boxed set of Solitaires recordings which included several previously unreleased songs. Due to a mixup at Old Town, it also included a song not performed by the Solitaires: "Darling, Listen to the Words of This Song" was actually performed by another Old Town group called the Supremes (not to be confused with the Motown Supremes). Another unreleased song, "Silent Grief", written and sung by Milton Love, was unearthed by a collector and released in the 1990s.

Milton Love retired in 2019.

== Influence ==
Although none of their original records made the charts, several of their songs have gained recognition over the years and have been included in anthologies such as 25 All-Time Doo-Wop Hits, The Best of Doo-Wop, Doo-Wop Classics, Doo-Wop Treasures, Only the Best of Old Town Records, and Rhino's Doo-Wop Box. (Richie Unterberger classed the Solitaires' "I Don't Stand a Ghost of a Chance With You" with the "should-have-been-hits" in his review of Doo-Wop Box.) The group's recording career is described as "illustrious" in Mitch Rosalsky's Encyclopedia of Rhythm & Blues and Doo-Wop Vocal Groups.

Decades after its original release, rock musician Lou Reed mentioned "Later for You, Baby" by the Solitaires in an interview, along with songs by the Mellows and other New York doo-wop groups, noting that they had been far more influential than anyone seemed to realize.

== Discography ==
- "Wonder Why"/"Blue Valentine", 1954, Old Town
- "Please Remember My Heart"/"South Of The Border", 1954, Old Town
- "Chances I've Taken"/"Lonely", 1954, Old Town
- "I Don't Stand A Ghost Of A Chance"/"Girl Of Mine", 1954, Old Town
- "My Dear"/"What Did She Say", 1955, Old Town
- "The Wedding"/"Don't Fall In Love", 1955, Old Town, US Cashbox No. 43
- "Magic Rose"/"Later For You Baby", 1955, Old Town
- "The Honeymoon"/"Fine Little Girl", 1956, Old Town
- "You've Sinned"/"You're Back With Me" (aka "The Angels Sang"), 1956, Old Town
- "Give Me One More Chance"/"Nothing Like A Little Love", 1956, Old Town
- "Walking Along"/"Please Kiss This Letter", 1957, Old Town
- "I Really Love You So" (aka "Honey Babe")/"Thrill Of Love", 1957, Old Town
- "Walkin' And Talkin'"/"No More Sorrows", 1958, Old Town
- "Walking Along"/"Please Kiss This Letter", 1958, Argo
- "Big Mary's House"/"Please Remember My Heart" (remake), 1958, Old Town
- "Embraceable You"/"Round Goes My Heart", 1958, Old Town
- "Helpless"/"Light A Candle In The Chapel", 1959, Old Town
- "Lonesome Lover"/"Pretty Thing", 1960, Old Town
- "The Time Is Here"/"Honey Babe", 1963, Old Town
- "Fool That I Am"/"Fair Weather Lover", 1964, MGM
