= Arthur Prysock =

American jazz and R&B singer (1924–1997)

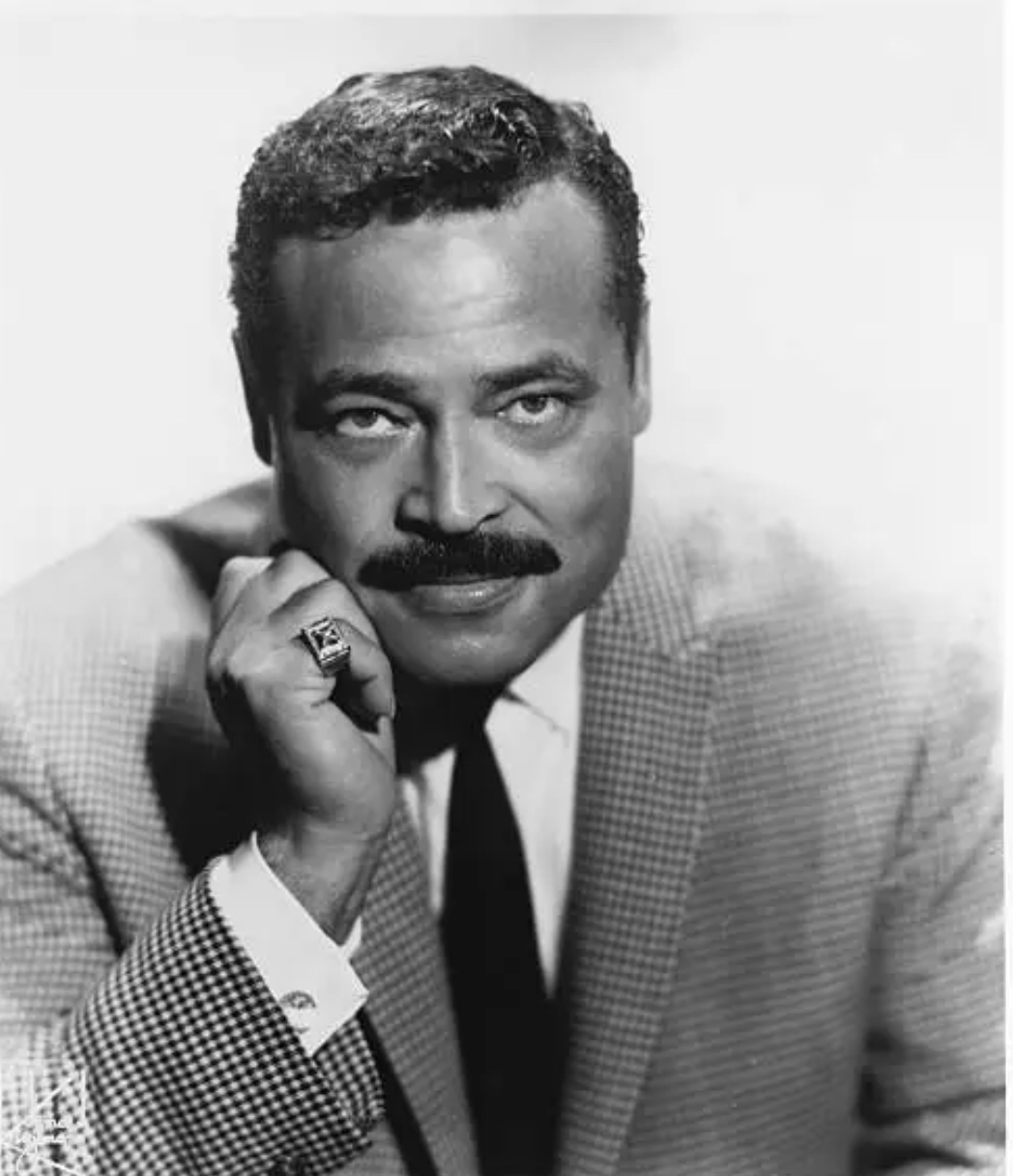

Background information
- Born: Arthur Prysock Jr. January 1, 1924; Spartanburg, South Carolina, U.S.
- Died: June 21, 1997 (aged 73) Hamilton, Bermuda
- Genres: Jazz; R&B; easy listening; disco
- Occupation: Singer
- Instrument: Vocals
- Years active: 1944–1990
- Labels: Decca; Old Town; Verve

Arthur Prysock Jr. (January 1, 1924 or 1929 – June 21, 1997) was an American jazz and R&B singer best known for his live shows and his deep baritone, influenced by Billy Eckstine. According to his obituary in The New York Times, "his heavy, deep voice projected a calm, reassuring virility."

== Life and career ==
Prysock was born in Spartanburg, South Carolina. Many sources give his birth year as 1929, but researchers Bob Eagle and Eric LeBlanc state 1924 on the basis of official records. He moved to North Carolina as a young child, and then to Hartford, Connecticut, to work in the aircraft industry during World War II, singing with small bands in the evenings. In 1944 bandleader Buddy Johnson signed him as a vocalist, and Prysock became a mainstay of the live performance circuits. Prysock sang on several of Johnson's hits on Decca Records including "They All Say I'm the Biggest Fool" (1946), "Jet (My Love)" (1947) and "I Wonder Where Our Love Has Gone" 1948), and later "Because" (1950).

In 1952 Prysock went solo. He signed with Decca, who marketed him as a younger rival to Billy Eckstine, and recorded the No. 5 R&B hit, "I Didn't Sleep a Wink Last Night", with Sy Oliver's orchestra. Over the years Prysock gained a reputation as an emotive balladeer and as one of the most popular acts on the Chitlin' Circuit. He recorded R&B classics such as Roy Brown's "Good Rocking Tonight". In the 1960s, Prysock joined Old Town Records and did an R&B cover of Ray Noble's ballad "The Very Thought of You" (1960) and a pop hit "It's Too Late, Baby (Too Late)" (1965). For Verve Records, he recorded Arthur Prysock and Count Basie (December 12, 13, 14, 20 and 21, 1965, at Van Gelder Studios, Englewood Cliffs, New Jersey), and A Working Man's Prayer (1968). He read verses from Walter Benton's book of poems against a jazz instrumental backdrop on his 1968 album, This is My Beloved. Between 1960 and 1988, he released over 30 LPs. He also briefly had his own television show in the 1960s.

In the 1970s, Prysock mainly played cabaret engagements; he gained his greatest fame during these years singing the jingle for the Lowenbrau television commercials. In 1976, he won a brief comeback with a Philly-flavored hit, ‘When Love is New’ (R&B#10 Pop#64). It also led him to perform this song on Soul Train. 1987 he received a Grammy nomination for "Teach Me Tonight", a duet with Betty Joplin, and the following year received another nomination for This Guy's in Love With You. His brother, Wilbur "Red" Prysock, was a tenor sax player who appeared on many of Arthur's later records.

Prysock received a Pioneer Award from the Rhythm and Blues Foundation in 1995. In later years he lived in Bermuda. He died after several years' illness from an aneurysm at King Edward Hospital, Hamilton, Bermuda, in 1997.

== Discography ==
=== Chart singles ===
Year	Single	Chart Positions	
Year	Single	US Pop	US R&B
1946	"They All Say I'm the Biggest Fool" with Buddy Johnson Orchestra	–	5
1950	"Because" with Buddy Johnson Orchestra	–	8
1952	"I Didn't Sleep a Wink Last Night"	–	5
1960	"The Very Thought of You"	–	19
1961	"One More Time"	–	30
1965	"It's Too Late, Baby (Too Late)"	56	11
1968	"A Working Man's Prayer"	74	–
1973	"In the Rain"	–	36
1976	"When Love Is New"	64	10
1977	"I Wantcha Baby"	–	43
1977	"You Can Do It"	–	33

=== Albums ===
- I Worry About You (Old Town LP-102, 1960)
- Arthur Prysock Sings Only For You (Old Town LP-2004, 1962)
- Coast To Coast (Old Town LP-2005, 1963)
- A Portrait of Arthur Prysock (Old Town LP-2006, 1963; reissue: Verve V6-5012, 1967)
- Everlasting Songs For Everlasting Lovers (Old Town LP-2007, 1964)
- Intimately Yours (Old Town LP-2008, 1964)
- A Double Header With Arthur Prysock (Old Town LP-2009, 1965)
- In A Mood With Arthur Prysock (Old Town LP-2010, 1965)
- Strictly Sentimental (Decca DL-4581, 1965) compilation of material recorded 1951–1953.
- Arthur Prysock Showcase: Songs That Made Him Famous (Decca DL-4628, 1965) compilation of early material featuring Buddy Johnson and His Orchestra.
- Arthur Prysock and Count Basie (Verve V6-8646, 1965 [rel. 1966])
- Mr. Arthur Prysock and Guest (Old Town LP-2011, 1966) 3 tracks with Count Basie, plus 8 tracks previously released on singles.
- Art & Soul (Verve V6-5009, 1966)
- Mister Prysock (Verve V6-5014, 1967) reissue of Arthur Prysock Sings Only For You, plus 2 tracks from Intimately Yours.
- Love Me (Verve V6-5029, 1967)
- To Love Or Not To Love (Verve V6-5048, 1968)
- I Must Be Doing Something Right (Verve V6-5059, 1968)
- This Is My Beloved (Verve V6-5070, 1968 [rel. 1969])
- Funny Thing (MGM SE-4694, 1968 [rel. 1970])
- The Country Side of Arthur Prysock (King KSD-1064, 1969)
- Where The Soul Trees Grow (King KSD-1066, 1969)
- The Lord Is My Shepherd (King KSD-1067, 1969)
- Fly My Love (King KSD-1088, 1970)
- Unforgettable (King KSD-1134, 1971)
- Arthur Prysock '74 (Old Town 12-001, 1973)
- Love Makes It Right (Old Town 12-002, 1974)
- All My Life (Old Town 12-004, 1976)
- Arthur Prysock Does It Again! (Old Town 12-005, 1977)
- Here's To Good Friends (MCA 3061, 1978)
- A Rockin' Good Way (Milestone 9139, 1985)
- This Guy's in Love With You (Milestone 9146, 1986)
- Today's Love Songs, Tomorrow's Blues (Milestone 9157, 1988)

=== Compilations ===
- The Best of Arthur Prysock (Verve V6-5011, 1966)
- The Best of Arthur Prysock, Number 2 (Verve V6-5038, 1967)
- Arthur Prysock...Golden Archive Series (MGM GAS-134, 1970)
- Arthur Prysock At His Very Best – Silk and Satin (Polydor PD-2-8901, 1977)
- Compact Jazz: Arthur Prysock (Verve 841130, 1989)
- Jazz 'Round Midnight: Arthur Prysock (Late Night Ballads and Blues) (Verve 527033, 1995)
- Morning, Noon & Night – The Collection (Verve 557484, 1998)
- The Best of Arthur Prysock – The Milestone Years (Milestone 9303, 2000)
- Too Late Baby: The Old Town Singles 1958–1966 (Ace CDTOP-1401, 2014)
- They All Say I'm The Biggest Fool: The Complete Recordings With Buddy Johnson (1946–1952) (Jasmine JASMCD-2609, 2014)
- You Never Know About Love (Jasmine JASMCD-2737, 2022) two complete albums on one CD: I Worry About You and Arthur Prysock Sings Only For You plus 4 bonus tracks.
- Early Years: Selected Singles 1946-1962 (Acrobat ADDCD-3458, 2023) 2-CD
