= List of 1960s deaths in popular music =

The following is a list of notable performers of rock and roll music or rock music, and others directly associated with the music as producers, songwriters or in other closely related roles, who have died in the 1960s. The list gives their date, cause and location of death, and their age.

Rock music developed from the rock and roll music that emerged during the 1950s, and includes a diverse range of subgenres. The terms "rock and roll" and "rock" each have a variety of definitions, some narrow and some wider. In determining criteria for inclusion, this list uses as its basis reliable sources listing "rock deaths" or "deaths in rock and roll", as well as such sources as the Rock and Roll Hall of Fame.

Preceded by 1950s	List of deaths in popular music 1960s	Succeeded by 1970s

Name	Age	Date	Location	Cause of death
Pete Griffiths; Ian And The Zodiacs	20	1960	Crosby, Merseyside, England	Motorcycle accident
Joe 'Ditto' Dias; The Chords	37	1960	U.S.	Unknown
Carlos Di Sarli	57	January 12, 1960	Olivos, Buenos Aires, Argentina	Sickness
Alfred Apaka	40	January 30, 1960	Honolulu, Hawaii, U.S.	Heart attack
Fred Buscaglione	38	February 3, 1960	Rome, Italy	Car accident
Jesse Belvin	27	February 6, 1960	Hope, Arkansas, U.S.	Car accident
Archie Brownlee; Five Blind Boys Of Mississippi	34	February 8, 1960	New Orleans, U.S.	Pneumonia
Pete Ash; The West Coast Playboys	30	March 2, 1960	Carson, California, U.S.	Car crash
Gene Alford; The Four Knights	37	April 2, 1960	Los Angeles, California, U.S.	Epileptic seizure
Forest City Joe	33	April 3, 1960	Horseshoe Lake, Arkansas, U.S.	Car crash
Beverly Kenney	28	April 13, 1960	Greenwich Village, New York City, New York, U.S.	Suicide by alcohol and secobarbital overdose
Eddie Cochran	21	April 17, 1960	Chippenham, Wiltshire, England	Car crash
Smokey Hogg	46	May 1, 1960	McKinney, Texas, U.S.	Unknown cancer
Eli Oberstein; Record producer and music executive	58	June 12, 1960	Westport, Connecticut, U.S.	Lymphatic cancer
Odell Rand; The Harlem Hamfats	55	June 22, 1960	Chicago, Illinois, U.S.	Unknown
Lee Collins; Trumpet For Jelly Roll Morton	58	July 3, 1960	Chicago, Illinois, U.S.	Unknown
Cesare Martuzzi Italian composer and choir director	75	August 4, 1960	Forlì-Cesena, Italy	
Giuseppe "Peppino" Fiorelli Italian lyricist and composer, best known for Neapolitan songs	56	August 6, 1960	Rome, Italy	
André Bloch	87	August 7, 1960	Paris, France	
Väinö Hannikainen Finnish composer and harpist	60	August 7, 1960	Kuhmoinen, Finland	
Louis Cahuzac French clarinetist and composer, pioneer of the recording of modern clarinet repertoire	71	August 9, 1960	Paris, France	
Oscar Hammerstein II Legendary American lyricist, librettist, and theatre producer (known for the duo Rodgers and Hammerstein)	65	August 23, 1960	Doylestown, Pennsylvania, United States	Stomach cancer
Oscar Pettiford	37	September 8, 1960	Copenhagen, Denmark	Polio-like virus
Costantino Ferri Italian composer and conductor	66	October 16, 1960	Rome, Italy	
Henri Crolla	40	October 17, 1960	Paris, France	Lung cancer
José Padilla Sánchez	71	October 25, 1960	Madrid, Spain	Colon cancer
Francis Drake "Pat" Ballard	61	October 26, 1960	New York, United States	Heart attack (cardiocirculatory arrest)
Alfred Hill	90	October 30, 1960	Sydney, Australia	Natural causes related to old age
Johnny Horton	35	November 5, 1960	Milano, Texas, U.S.	Car crash
A. P. Carter; Carter Family	68	November 7, 1960	Kingsport, Tennessee, U.S.	Unknown
Ion Vasilescu Romanian composer and conductor	57	December 1, 1960	Bucharest, Romania	
Hermann Stephani German organist and musicologist	83	December 3, 1960	Marburg, Germany	
Walter Goehr	57	December 4, 1960	Sheffield, United Kingdom	Sudden heart attack
Clara Haskil	65	December 7, 1960	Belgium	Serious brain injuries sustained following a disastrous fall
Semyon Bogatyrev Soviet musicologist and composer, known for completing and reconstructing Tchaikovsky's Symphony in E-flat major	70	December 31, 1960	Moscow, Russia	
Sergei Polyakov; The Actor For Aerograd	55	1961	USSR, Soviet Union	Unknown
Ken Headley; The Presidents	19	1961	County Durham, England	Viral pneumonia
Blanche Ring American singer and actress	89	January 13, 1961	Santa Monica, California, United States	Failing health due to previous stroke
Henry Geehl	79	January 14, 1961	Beaconsfield, United Kingdom	
Francesco Maria Saraceni Italian composer	49	January 15, 1961	Cologne, Germany	
János Viski Hungarian classical pianist and composer	54	January 16, 1961	Budapest, Hungary	
John Joseph Becker American composer and conductor	74	January 21, 1961	Wilmette, Illinois, United States	
Alphonse Picou	82	February 4, 1961	New Orleans, U.S.	Likely old age
Paul Wittgenstein Famous Austrian-born American pianist, he became world-famous for continuing his concert career using only his left hand, after losing his right arm during the First World War	73	March 3, 1961	New York City, New York, United States	
George Formby British singer, actor and comedian, best known for his performances accompanied by the ukulele	56	March 6, 1961	Preston, United Kingdom	Heart attack (myocardial infarction)
Sir Thomas Beecham	81	March 8, 1961	London, England	Cerebral thrombosis (after a period of declining health and previous vascular problems experienced in the previous year)
Wilbur Sweatman	79	March 9, 1961	New York City, New York, United States	
Edric Cundell British music teacher, composer and conductor	68	March 19, 1961	Ashwell, Hertfordshire, England	
Jack Kane Canadian arranger, conductor, clarinetist, and composer of English birth	36	March 27, 1961	Toronto, Ontario, Canada	
Kelsey Pharr; The Delta Rhythm Boys	44	April 20, 1961	Honolulu, Hawaii, U.S.	Unknown cancer/Severe illness
Cisco Houston	42	April 29, 1961	San Bernardino, California, U.S.	Stomach cancer
Tommy McClennan	56	May 6, 1961	Chicago, Illinois, U.S.	Bronchopneumonia
Margaret McManamny Australian opera singer (soprano) and music teacher, active for over 70 years on the operatic and choral scene	85	June 1, 1961	Ballarat, Victoria, Australia	
Cheikh Raymond	48	June 22, 1961	Constantine, Algeria	Killed by a gunshot to the back of the head
E.A. Mario Italian lyricist and poet	77	June 24, 1961	Naples, Italy	
Rupert Branker; The Chords	25	July 3, 1961	Los Angeles, California, U.S.	Murdered
Scott LaFaro	25	July 6, 1961	Seneca, New York, U.S.	Automobile accident
Sticks McGhee	43	August 15, 1961	The Bronx, New York, U.S.	Lung cancer
Karl Farr	52	September 20, 1961	West Springfield, Massachusetts, U.S.	Heart attack
Booker Little	23	October 5, 1961	New York City, U.S.	Uremia
Marguerite Monnot	58	October 12, 1961	Paris, France	Unknown
Lord Invader	46	October 15, 1961	New York City, U.S.	Unspecified illness
Little Son Joe	61	November 14, 1961	John Gaston Hospital, Tennessee, U.S.	Heart disease
Jēkabs Graubiņš Latvian composer, music critic and teacher	75	December 3, 1961	Riga, Latvia	
William Beatton Moonie	78	December 8, 1961	Edinburgh, Scotland, United Kingdom	
Boris Ord	64	December 30, 1961	Cambridge, Cambridgeshire, England, UK	Multiple sclerosis
Lenny Miles	27	1962	Fort Worth, Texas	Cancer
Jerome Hanna; The Jive Five	25	1962	New York City, U.S.	Unknown
Etilmon Stark	94	January 1, 1962	Maplewood, Missouri, U.S.	Likely old age
Leroy Shield American film score composer	68	January 9, 1962	Vero Beach, Indian River County, Florida, United States	
Doug Watkins	27	February 5, 1962	Holbrook, Arizona, U.S.	Automobile accident
Leo Parker	36	February 11, 1962	New York City, U.S.	Heart attack
Walter "Papoose" Nelson	29	February 28, 1962	New York City, U.S.	Heroin overdose
Mary Cardwell Dawson Founder of the National Negro Opera Company and music educator	68	March 19, 1962	Washington, United States	Heart attack
Jean Goldkette Pianist and well-known jazz orchestra leader in the 1920s	69	March 24, 1962	Los Angeles, California, United States	Heart attack
Jack Purvis Trumpeter and composer active in the American jazz scene	55	March 30, 1962	San Francisco, California, United States	
Stuart Sutcliffe; The Beatles	21	April 10, 1962	Hamburg, West Germany	Cerebral paralysis due to aneurysm;
Milt Franklyn American composer	64	April 24, 1962	Hollywood, Los Angeles, California, U.S.	Heart attack (myocardial infarction)
Wayne Arnold; The Imperials	21	April 25, 1962	Tijuana, Mexico	Murdered
Antonio Verdes Sanchez; Los Locos del Ritmo	22	May 5, 1962	El Paso, Texas, U.S.	Throat cancer
John Ireland Well-known English composer and pianist, author of important choral and orchestral works	82	June 12, 1962	Washington, United Kingdom	Rapid deterioration in his health
Eugene Goossens English conductor and composer	69	June 13, 1962	Middlesex, England	Cardiac complications (heart condition)
Alfredo Sangiorgi Italian composer and composition teacher	67	June 18, 1962	Merano, Italy	
Eddie Costa	31	July 28, 1962	New York City, U.S.	Car crash
Marilyn Monroe	36	August 4, 1962	Los Angeles, California, U.S.	Barbiturate overdose
Hanns Eisler	64	September 6, 1962	East Berlin, Germany	Myocardial infarction (a heart attack)
Solomon Linda South African singer and songwriter, he is best known for writing the song "Mbube", which was later adapted into the international hit "The Lion Sleeps Tonight"	52	September 8, 1962	Johannesburg, South Africa	Kidney failure (complexity aggravated by the extreme poverty in which he lived)
Marcel Delannoy French composer of numerous operas, ballets and film scores	64	September 14, 1962	Nantes, France	Heart attack (cardiac crisis)
Curley Weaver American blues musician	56	September 20, 1962	Almon, Georgia, United States	Uremia (advanced stage renal failure)
Scrapper Blackwell	59	October 7, 1962	Indianapolis, Indiana, U.S.	Shot
Rubberlegs Williams	55	October 17, 1962	NYC, New York, U.S.	Heart attack
John J. Konrad Choral conductor, music educator, and founder of Canadian music institutes	64	November 5, 1962	Winnipeg, Manitoba, Canada	
Alexander Spitzmüller Austrian composer, educator and music critic	68	November 12, 1962	Paris, France	
Mercy Dee Walton	47	December 2, 1962	Murphys, California, U.S.	Cerebral hemorrhage
Sonny Clark	31	January 13, 1963	New York City, U.S.	Heart attack
Ike Quebec	44	January 16, 1963	New York City, U.S.	Lung cancer
Benny More	43	February 19, 1963	Havana, Cuba	Liver cirrhosis
Addison Farmer	34	February 23, 1963	New York City, New York, U.S.	Unknown
Bobby Jaspar	37	February 28, 1963	New York City, U.S.	Heart attack
Patsy Cline	30	March 5, 1963	Camden, Tennessee, U.S.	1963 Camden PA-24 crash
Cowboy Copas	49	March 5, 1963	Camden, Tennessee, U.S.	1963 Camden PA-24 crash
Hawkshaw Hawkins	41	March 5, 1963	Camden, Tennessee, U.S.	1963 Camden PA-24 crash
Jack Anglin	46	March 8, 1963	Columbia, Tennessee, U.S.	Car crash
Julius Harrison Composer	78	April 5, 1963	Harpenden, United Kingdom	
Eddie Edwards American jazz trombonist, best known as a member of the Original Dixieland Jass Band	71	April 9, 1963	New Orleans, Louisiana, United States	
Herbie Nichols	43	April 12, 1963	New York, United States	Leukemia
Eddy Howard	48	May 23, 1963	Palm Desert, California, U.S.	Cerebral hemorrhage
Elmore James	45	May 24, 1963	Chicago, Illinois, U.S.	Heart attack
Glen Gray	63	May 24, 1963	Plymouth, Massachusetts, U.S.	
Luis Arcaraz Pianist, composer, conductor and singer	52	June 1, 1963	Mexico	Car accident
Fritz Reutter German composer and teacher	66	July 4, 1963	Germany	
Daniel Ruyneman	76	July 5, 1963	Amsterdam, Netherlands	
Dorian Le Gallienne Australian composer of orchestral and chamber music	48	July 29, 1963	Eltham, Victoria, Australia	Diabetes-induced heart disease
Salvador Bacarisse Spanish composer	64	August 5, 1963	Paris, France	
Sándor Jemnitz	72	August 8, 1963	Balatonföldvár, Hungary	
Clyde Hurley	46	August 14, 1963	Fort Worth, Texas, United States	
John Powell American composer and pianist	80	August 15, 1963	Richmond, Virginia, United States	
Kathleen Parlow	72	August 19, 1963	Oakville, Canada	
Glen Gray	63	August 23, 1963	Plymouth, Massachusetts, United States	
Jack Pettis American jazz saxophonist and composer	61	August 24, 1963	Oklahoma City, Oklahoma, United States	
Axel Stordahl American arranger	50	August 30, 1963	Encino, Los Angeles, California, United States	Cancer
Jack Beaver	63	September 10, 1963	Battersea, London, England	
Honorio Siccardi	65	September 10, 1963	Buenos Aires, Argentina	
Ernest Whitfield British violinist and concert pianist	74	September 21, 1963	London, United Kingdom	
Willie Eckstein Canadian ragtime pianist and composer	75	September 23, 1963	Montreal, Canada	
Walter Davis	51 or 52	October 22, 1963	St. Louis, Missouri, U.S.	
Daddy Stovepipe	96	November 1, 1963	Chicago, Illinois, U.S.	Bronchial pneumonia after a gallbladder operation
Joe Gordon	35	November 4, 1963	Santa Monica, California, U.S.	House fire
Ronnie Mack	23	November 5, 1963	The Bronx, New York, U.S.	Hodgkin's disease
Cousin Herb	38	November 26, 1963	Bakersfield, California, U.S.	Unknown
Susie Hawthorne	67 or 69	December 5, 1963	Chicago, Illinois, U.S.	Unknown
Encho Bagarov	38	December 13, 1963	Sofia, Bulgaria	Car accident
Dinah Washington	39	December 14, 1963	Detroit, Michigan, U.S.	Complications of a drug overdose
Tom Delaney	74	December 16, 1963	Baltimore, Maryland, U.S.	Artery problems
Clifford Gibson	62	December 21, 1963	St. Louis, Missouri, U.S.	Pulmonary edema
William "Ricky" Edwards; The Chords	44 or 45	1964	U.S.	Unknown
Paul Chapman; Lincoln Street Exit		1964		Unknown
Joe Rock	54	1964	Pittsburgh, Allegheny County, Pennsylvania, U.S.	Cancer
Cyril Davies	31	January 7, 1964	Eel Pie Island, London, England	Endocarditis and leukaemia
Vera Hall	61	January 29, 1964	Tuscaloosa, Alabama, U.S.	Cerebral apoplexy
Vincenzo Bellezza Famous Italian conductor, active in the major opera houses of the world	75	February 8, 1964	Rome, Italy	
Ary Barroso	60	February 9, 1964	Rio de Janeiro, Brazil	Liver cirrhosis
Willie Bryant American jazz singer, bandleader and radio host	55	February 9, 1964	New Orleans, Louisiana, United States	Heart attack
Marek Weber	75	February 9, 1964	Chicago, Illinois, United States	
Johnny Burke American lyricist and composer (author of songs such as Swinging on a Star )	55	February 25, 1964	New York, United States	Heart attack
Sergius Kagen	54	March 1, 1964	New York, United States	
Alessio De PaolisItalian tenor	70	March 9, 1964	New York, United States	
Jean Rogister Belgian violist and composer	84	March 20, 1964	Liège, Belgium	
Willem Andriessen	76	March 30, 1964	Amsterdam, Netherlands	
Noah Ryder; The Deep River Boys	50	April 17, 1964	Norfolk, Virginia, U.S.	Unknown
Rudy Lewis; The Drifters	27	May 20, 1964	New York City, U.S.	Died in his sleep/Asphyxiation
Miloš Bergl	32	May 27, 1964	Mariánské Lázně, Czechia	Unknown
Meade Lux Lewis	58	June 7, 1964	Minneapolis, Minnesota, U.S.	Car crash
Lidia Klement	26	June 16, 1964	Saint Petersburg, Russia	Melanoma
Eric Dolphy	36	June 29, 1964	Berlin, Germany	Complications from diabetes
Jim Reeves	40	July 31, 1964	Davidson County, Tennessee, U.S.	Plane crash
Dean Manuel	30	July 31, 1964	Davidson County, Tennessee, U.S.	Plane crash
Tooter Boatman; The Chaparrals	28	August 1, 1964	Clear Lake, California, U.S.	Automobile accident
Johnny Burnette; The Rock and Roll Trio	30	August 14, 1964	Clear Lake, California, U.S.	Drowned following a serious boating accident
Tiny Topsy	34	August 16, 1964	Chicago, Illinois, U.S.	Brain hemorrhage
Gracie Allen	69	August 27, 1964	Los Angeles, California, U.S.	Heart attack
George GeorgescuRomanian conductor and composer	76	September 1, 1964	Bucharest, Romania	Complications from a heart attack
Otto Olsson Swedish organist and composer	84	September 1 , 1964	Stockholm, Sweden	
Joseph Marx Austrian composer and music critic	82	September 3, 1964	Graz, Austria	
Charles O'Neill Irish-Canadian composer, organist and bandleader	82	September 9, 1964	Quebec City, Canada	
Mary Howe American composer and pianist	82	September 14, 1964	Washington, D.C, United States	
Ernest Hill American jazz bassist	64	September 16, 1964	New York City, New York, United States	
Giovanni Gagliardi Italian accordionist and composer	82	September 26, 1964	Castelvetro Piacentino, Piacenza, Italy	
Nacio Herb Brown American composer (author of famous songs such as Singin' in the Rain)	68	September 28, 1964	San Francisco, California, United States	Cancer
George Dyson English composer and musician (father of the physicist Freeman Dyson)	81	September 28, 1964	Winchester, England	
David Box; The Crickets	21	October 23, 1964	Houston, Texas, U.S.	Plane crash
Buddy Groves; Buddy & The Kings	20	October 23, 1964	Houston, Texas, U.S.	Plane crash
Carl Banks; Buddy & The Kings	18	October 23, 1964	Houston, Texas, U.S.	Plane crash
Bill Daniels; Buddy & The Kings	20	October 23, 1964	Houston, Texas, U.S.	Plane crash
Joe Henderson	27	October 24, 1964	Nashville, Tennessee, U.S.	Heart attack
Haakon Stotijn Dutch oboist of the Concertgebouw Orchestra	49	November 3, 1964	Amsterdam, Netherlands	
Buster Pickens	48	November 24, 1964	Houston, Texas, U.S.	Gunshot wound
Frank Winchester; The Amblers	21	November 30, 1964	Pittsburgh, Pennsylvania, U.S.	Car crash
Brian Talbot; Tony Rivers And The Castaways	21	December 5, 1964	Lanarkshire, Scotland	Tour bus accident
Sam Cooke; The Soul Stirrers	33	December 11, 1964	Los Angeles, California, U.S.	Shot by Bertha Franklin
Percy Kilbride; Actor for State Fair	76	December 11, 1964	Los Angeles, California, U.S.	Pneumonia and atherosclerosis
Alan Freed	43	January 20, 1965	Palm Springs, California, U.S.	Uremia and cirrhosis of the liver
Arthur Schutt	62	January 28, 1965	San Francisco, California, U.S.	Illness
Nat King Cole	45	February 15, 1965	Santa Monica, California, U.S.	Lung cancer
Václav Hrabě	24	March 5, 1965	Prague, Czechoslovakia	Carbon monoxide poisoning
Tadd Dameron	48	March 8, 1965	NYC, New York, U.S.	Cancer
Fraser Calder; The Blues Council	23	March 12, 1965	Glasgow, Scotland	Van crash
James Giffen; The Blues Council	19	March 12, 1965	Glasgow, Scotland	Van crash
Sonny Boy Williamson II	52	May 25, 1965	Helena, Arkansas, U.S.	Heart attack
Judy Holliday	43	June 7, 1965	NYC, New York, U.S.	Cancer
Ira Louvin	41	June 20, 1965	Jefferson City, Missouri, U.S.	Car crash
Mark Leeman; The Mark Leeman Five	24	June 27, 1965	United Kingdom	Car crash
Claude Thornhill American pianist, arranger, composer and bandleader (known for songs such as Snowfall)	56	July 1, 1965	Caldwell, New Jersey, United States	Heart attack
Valdemar Eiberg Danish jazz musician	72	July 4, 1965	Copenhagen, Denmark	
Spencer Williams American jazz composer, pianist and singer, author of classics such as Basin Street Blues and I Ain't Got Nobody	75	July 14, 1965	Flushing, New York, United States	
Luiz Cosme Brazilian composer	57	July 17, 1965	Rio de Janeiro, Brazil	
Shalva Mikhailovich Taktakishvili Russian composer and conductor	64	July 18, 1965	Tbilisi, Georgia	
Haroldo Lobo Brazilian composer and musician	54	July 20, 1965	Rio de Janeiro, Brazil	
Maurice Yvain French composer of light music and operettas	74	July 28, 1965	Suresnes, France	
Charles Fizer; The Olympics	25	August 14, 1965	Los Angeles, California, U.S.	Shot at Watts Riot
Albert Schweitzer Franco-German physician and philanthropist, musician and musicologist, theologian, philosopher, biblical scholar, pastor, and Lutheran missionary born in Alsace	90	September 4, 1965	Lambaréné, Gabon	
Red Ingle American musician, singer-songwriter, arranger, cartoonist, and caricaturist, he is best known for his comedy recordings with Spike Jones and his Natural Seven roles for Capitol	58	September 6, 1965	Santa Barbara, California, United States	
Steve Brown American jazz double bassist, pioneer of the instrument in the early New Orleans jazz orchestras	75	September 15, 1965	Detroit, Michigan, United States	
Ahn Eak-tai South Korean composer	58	September 16, 1965	Mallorca, Spain	
Ed Sturgill	55	October 1, 1965	Norton, Virginia, U.S.	Unknown
Bill Black	39	October 21, 1965	Memphis, Tennessee, U.S.	Brain tumor
Peter LaFarge	34	October 27, 1965	NYC, New York, U.S.	Stroke
Earl Bostic	52	October 28, 1965	Rochester, New York, U.S.	Heart attack
Terry Thompson	24	November 10, 1965	Houston County, Alabama	Unknown
Eddie Sulik	36	December 9, 1965	Trumbull, Connecticut, U.S.	Car crash
Dave Barbour	53	December 12, 1965	Malibu, California, U.S.	Hemorrhaged ulcer
Henry Booth; The Midnighters	44	1966	Montgomery, Alabama, U.S.	Unknown
Marcel Tabuteau French-born American oboist, known for his long tenure with the Philadelphia Orchestra	78	January 4, 1966	Nice, France	
Guido Albanese Italian composer and musician originally from Ortona	72	January 6, 1966	Rome, Italy	
Haro Levoni Step'anian Armenian composer	68	January 9, 1966	Yerevan, Armenia	
Leonid Yablonsky Ukrainian musician, composer and conductor	57	January 11, 1966	Toronto, Canada	
Allan Roberts American lyricist and musician, author of famous pop and jazz songs	60	January 14, 1966	Hollywood, California, United States	Heart attack
Pierre Mercure Canadian bassoonist and composer	38	January 29, 1966	Avallon, France	Road traffic accident in France
Osie Johnson	43	February 2, 1966	New York City, New York, U.S.	Kidney failure
Billy Rose	66	February 10, 1966	Montego Bay	Pneumonia
Mike Millward; Rhythm guitarist for The Fourmost	24	March 7, 1966	Bromborough, England	Leukemia/Blood cancer
Jazz Gillum	61	March 29, 1966	Chicago, Illinois, U.S.	Gunshot wound
Larry Evans; Tom Thumb And The Casuals	16	April 17-18, 1966	Richland, Washington	Car crash
Tom Blessing; Tom Thumb And The Casuals	17	April 17-18, 1966	Richland, Washington	Car crash
Richard Fariña	29	April 30, 1966	Carmel Valley, California, U.S.	Motorcycle accident
Juan María Thomas Sabater Spanish composer and organist	69	May 4, 1966	Palma, Majorca, Spain	
Alfred Mendelsohn Romanian composer, teacher and conductor, long active at the Romanian National Opera	56	May 9, 1966	Bucharest, Romania	
Eugenia Farrar Swedish-American mezzo-soprano, who made history as the first singer ever to perform on a radio broadcast	93	May 17, 1966	New York City, New York, United States	
Papa Jack Laine American jazz pioneer and New Orleans bandleader	92	June 1, 1966	Metairie, Louisiana, United States	
Hermann Scherchen German conductor and music theorist	74	June 12, 1966	Florence, Italy	
Thomas Chalmers American baritone/opera singer, actor, and film pioneer	81	June 12, 1966	Greenwich, Connecticut, United States	
German Galynin Russian classical composer	44	June 16, 1966	Moscow, Russia	
Marjan Kozina Slovenian composer	59	June 19, 1966	Novo Mesto, Slovenia	
Arthur Meulemans	82	June 29, 1966	Etterbeek, Belgium	
Bobby Fuller; The Bobby Fuller Four	23	July 18, 1966	Los Angeles, California, U.S.	Asphyxia (suicide, murder or accident)
Bud Powell	41	July 31, 1966	Brooklyn, New York, U.S.	Tuberculosis
Peg Leg Howell	78	August 11, 1966	Atlanta, Georgia, U.S.	Complications from diabetes
Roby Ferrante Italian singer and composer	23	August 19, 1966	Altopascio, Lucca, Italy	Road accident
Dad Speer; Speer Family	74	September 7, 1966	Nashville, Tennessee, U.S.	Unknown
Leroy Griffin; The Nutmegs	32	September 14, 1966	Connecticut, U.S.	Died in furnace
Dave Lambert; Lambert, Hendricks & Ross	49	October 3, 1966	Connecticut Turnpike, Connecticut, U.S.	Car crash
Smiley Lewis	53	October 7, 1966	New Orleans, Louisiana, U.S.	Stomach cancer
Johnny Kidd; Johnny Kidd & The Pirates	30	October 8, 1966	Breightmet, Bolton, Lancashire, England	Car accident
Glenn Hughes; The Blue Flames	24	October 28, 1966	London, England	House fire
Mississippi John Hurt	74	November 2, 1966	Grenada, Mississippi, U.S.	Heart attack
Washboard Sam	56	November 6, 1966	Chicago, Illinois, U.S.	Heart disease
Shorty Baker	52	November 8, 1966	New York City, New York, U.S.	Unknown
Harold Burrage	35	November 26, 1966	Chicago, Illinois, U.S.	Heart failure
Carter Stanley	41	December 1, 1966	New York City, New York, U.S.	Liver cirrhosis
Kui Lee	34	December 3, 1966	Tijuana, Mexico	Cancer
Frans Kroon; The Hamlets	22	1967	Netherlands	Car crash
Russ "Soupy" Morrow; The Deepest Blue	18 or 19	1967	Pomona, California, United States	Motorcycle accident
Gerald Hamilton; The Crows	33	1967	New York City, New York, U.S.	Unknown
George Treadwell; Manager For The Drifters	48	1967	New York City, New York, U.S.	Unknown
Moon Mullican	57	January 1, 1967	Beaumont, Texas, U.S.	Heart attack
Luigi Tenco	28	January 27, 1967	Sanremo, Italy	Suicide
Joe Meek	37	February 3, 1967	London, England	Suicide by gunshot
Ty O'Brian; Rory Storm And The Hurricanes	26	February 20, 1967	England	Blood poisoning after surgery related to a duodenal ulcer
Rocco Montana Italian singer of light music	37	February 24, 1967	Parma, Italy	Car crash/Traffic collision
Fats Pichon	60	February 25, 1967	Chicago, Illinois, U.S.	Unknown
Nelson Eddy	65	March 6, 1967	Miami Beach, Florida, U.S.	Cerebral hemorrhage
Jimmy Blaine	42	March 18, 1967	Wilton, Connecticut, U.S.	Heart attack
Albert Augustine	67	April , 1967	New York City	Heart attack
J. B. Lenoir	38	April 29, 1967	Urbana, Illinois, U.S.	Injuries from a car crash
LaVerne Andrews; The Andrews Sisters	55	May 8, 1967	Los Angeles, California, U.S.	Unknown cancer
Elmo Hope	43	May 19, 1967	New York City, U.S.	Heart failure
Billy Strayhorn American arranger	51	May 31, 1967	New York City, New York, United States	Esophageal cancer
Maud MacCarthy Irish violinist and singer, also known for her studies of theosophy and Indian music	84	June 2, 1967	Douglas, Isle of Man	
André Cluytens Belgian conductor	62	June 3, 1967	Neuilly-sur-Seine, France	
Vernon "Vern" Wray Jr; The Junior Raymen	15	July 9, 1967	Cheverly, Maryland, U.S.	Unknown
John Coltrane	40	July 17, 1967	Huntington, New York, U.S.	Liver disease and hepatitis B
Stewart Crunk; The Calvanes	30	August 4, 1967	Los Angeles County, California, U.S.	Asthma
Brian Epstein	32	August 27, 1967	London, England	Accidental drug overdose
Rex Stewart	60	September 7, 1967	Los Angeles, California, U.S.	Brain hemorrhage
David Patillo; The 5 Red Caps	53	September 8, 1967	Los Angeles, California, U.S.	
Stuff Smith American jazz violinist	58	September 25, 1967	Munich, Germany	
Woody Guthrie	55	October 3, 1967	New York City, U.S.	Huntington's disease
Mom Speer; The Speer Family	67	October 9, 1967	Nashville, Tennessee, U.S.	Illness
Robert Nighthawk	57	November 5, 1967	Helena, Arkansas, U.S.	Heart failure
Peter Bocage	80	December 3, 1967	New Orleans, Louisiana, U.S.	Unknown
Bert Lahr; Cowardly Lion from The Wizard of Oz	72	December 4, 1967	New York City, New York, U.S.	Pneumonia/Unknown cancer
Otis Redding	26	December 10, 1967	Madison, Wisconsin, U.S.	Plane crash
Ronnie Caldwell; The Bar-Kays	18	December 10, 1967	Madison, Wisconsin, U.S.	Plane crash
Phalon Jones; The Bar-Kays	19	December 10, 1967	Madison, Wisconsin, U.S.	Plane crash
Jimmy King; The Bar-Kays	18	December 10, 1967	Madison, Wisconsin, U.S.	Plane crash
Carl Cunningham; The Bar-Kays	19	December 10, 1967	Madison, Wisconsin, U.S.	Plane crash
Robin Roberts; The Wailers	27	December 22, 1967	San Mateo County, California, U.S.	Car crash
Pat Kilroy	24	December 25, 1967	San Francisco, California, U.S.	Hodgkin's lymphoma
Bert Berns	38	December 30, 1967	New York City, U.S.	Heart failure
Jimmy Reilly; Watertower West	17	1968	Greenwich Village, New York City	Drug overdose
Benny Trieber; The Mind's Eye	26 or 27	1968	McQueeney Lake, U.S.	Boating accident
George "King" Scott; The Hesitations	22	1968	Cleveland, Ohio, United States	Accidental gunshot murder
Gribouille	26	January 18, 1968	Paris, France	Drug overdose
Nick Pantas; The Electric Elves	26	February 12, 1968	Cortland County, New York, U.S.	Car accident
Little Walter	37	February 15, 1968	Chicago, Illinois, U.S.	Coronary thrombosis due to injuries sustained when he was beaten
Frankie Lymon; Frankie Lymon and the Teenagers	25	February 27, 1968	New York City, U.S.	Complications of a heroin overdose
Syd Nathan	63	March 5, 1968	Miami Beach, Florida, U.S.	Pneumonia
Mario Castelnuovo-Tedesco Italian-American composer and pianist	72	March 16, 1968	Beverly Hills, California, United States	
Bumps Myers	55	April 9, 1968	Los Angeles, California, U.S.	Several health conditions
Lester Melrose; Record producer	76	April 12, 1968	Lake, Florida, U.S.	Unknown
Fay Bainter; Actress for State Fair	74	April 16, 1968	Los Angeles, California, U.S.	Pneumonia
Ron Parr; The Hard Times Band	19	April 30, 1968	Vietnam	Killed in action
Manolo Fernández; Los Bravos	23	May 20, 1968	Seville, Spain	Suicide by gunshot
Little Willie John	30	May 26, 1968	Walla Walla, Washington, U.S.	Heart attack
Giovanni Fusco Italian pianist, composer and conductor, among the first composers of film soundtracks	61	June 1, 1968	Rome, Italy	Heart attack
Bumble Bee Slim	63	June 8, 1968	Los Angeles, California, U.S.	Unknown
Ken Errair; The 4 Freshmen	38	June 14, 1968	Bass Lake, California	Plane crash
Wes Montgomery	45	June 15, 1968	Indianapolis, Indiana, U.S.	Heart attack
Phil Pill; Brandi Perry & The Bubble Machine	17	July 5, 1968	Vietnam	Killed in war
Kurt Willis; Brandi Perry & The Bubble Machine	17	July 5, 1968	Vietnam	Killed in war
Alan Avick; The Bootleggers	17 or 18	July 7, 1968	West Babylon, Suffolk County, New York, U.S.	Leukemia
Gary Richardson; The Swinging Machine	22	July 9, 1968	Hampton Roads, Virginia, United States	Drug overdose
Dexter Bell; The Soundstations	20	July 22, 1968	Vietnam	Mortar attack
Nervous Norvus	56	July 24, 1968	Alameda County, California, U.S.	Cirrhosis
Wiliam Bukový	36	August 1, 1968	Prague, Czechoslovakia	Illness
Luther Perkins	40	August 5, 1968	Nashville, Tennessee, U.S.	Smoke inhalation
Joe Hinton	38	August 13, 1968	Boston, Massachusetts, U.S.	Melanoma/Skin cancer
Karel Duba; Skupina Karla Duby	44	August 21, 1968	Ulanbaatar, Mongolia	Bus crash
Josef Poslední; Skupina Karla Duby	45	August 21, 1968	Ulanbaatar, Mongolia	Bus crash
Jaroslav Štrudl; Skupina Karla Duby	45	August 21, 1968	Ulanbaatar, Mongolia	Bus crash
Dana Hobzová; Skupina Karla Duby	21	August 21, 1968	Ulanbaatar, Mongolia	Bus crash
Marie Pokštelfová; Skupina Karla Duby	35	August 21, 1968	Ulanbaatar, Mongolia	Bus crash
Bohumil Vaněk; Skupina Karla Duby	23	August 21, 1968	Ulanbaatar, Mongolia	Bus crash
Salvino Chiereghin Italian music and literary critic	66	September 1, 1968	Cavalese, Italy	
Granville English American composer	73	September 1, 1968	New York City, New York, United States	
Juan José Castro	73	September 5, 1968	Buenos Aires, Argentina	
Karl Rankl Austrian-British composer and conductor, associated with the Covent Garden Opera Company	69	September 6, 1968	Salzburg, Austria	
Thom Kelling Dutch singer, guitarist and bandleader	46	September 7, 1968	Bunnik, Utrecth, Netherlands	
Chris Bouchillon American musician	75	September 18, 1968	West Palm Beach, Florida, United States	
Red Foley Singer and pioneer of American country music	58	September 19, 1968	Fort Wayne, Indiana, United States	Respiratory failure
Frank Pelleg Czech-Israeli harpsichordist, pianist and conductor	57	September 20, 1968	Haifa, Israel	
Harry Robert Wilson American composer and music educator	67	September 24, 1968	Brewster, New York, United States	
Carlo Concina Italian composer and conductor , famous for having composed Vola colomba , the winning song at the 1952 Sanremo Festival	68	September 28, 1968	Confienza, Italy	
Rosa Lee Hill American blues musician	58	October 22, 1968	Senatobia, Mississippi, United States	
Malcolm Hale; Spanky and Our Gang	27	October 31, 1968	Chicago, Illinois, U.S.	Either bronchial pneumonia or accidental carbon monoxide poisoning
Red Foley	58	September 19, 1968	Fort Wayne, Indiana, U.S.	Died in his sleep/Respiratory failure
Mifflin "Pee Wee" Brantford; The Dozier Boys	53	November 4 1968	Chicago, Illinois,U.S.	Suicide
Kokomo Arnold	72	November 8, 1968	Chicago, Illinois, U.S.	Heart attack
Tina Lawton	24	December 24, 1968	Mount Longonot, Great Rift Valley, Kenya	Plane accident
Paul Chambers	33	January 4, 1969	New York City, U.S.	Tuberculosis
Charles Winninger; Actor for State Fair	84	January 27, 1969	Palm Springs, California, U.S.	Illness
Giovanni Martinelli Italian tenor, one of the great protagonists of the Metropolitan Opera in New York	83	February 2, 1969	Montagnana, Italy	
Bainbridge Crist American composer	85	February 7, 1969	Barnstable, Massachusetts, United States	
Pee Wee Russell American jazz clarinetist and saxophonist	62	February 15, 1969	Alexandria, Virginia, United States	
Paul Barbarin Jazz drummer and famous New Orleans bandleader	69	February 17, 1969	New Orleans, Louisiana, United States	
Ernest Ansermet Swiss conductor, founder of the Orchestre de la Suisse Romande	85	February 20, 1969	Geneva, Switzerland	
Constantin Silvestri Romanian conductor and composer	55	February 23, 1969	London, England	
Dickie Pride	27	March 26, 1969	London, England	Complications from a barbiturate overdose
Bryant "Blinky" Allen; Blinky Allen And The Stardusters	50	April 2, 1969	Los Angeles, California, U.S.	Unknown
Benny Benjamin; The Funk Brothers	43	April 20, 1969	New York City, U.S.	Stroke/No brain activity
Don Drummond	35	May 6, 1969	Kingston, Jamaica	Suicide (disputed)
Martin Lamble; Fairport Convention	19	May 12, 1969	Scratchwood Services, M1 Motorway, England	Car crash
Coleman Hawkins	64	May 19, 1969	New York City, U.S.	Liver disease
Judy Garland; Dorothy Gale from The Wizard of Oz among other acting roles	47	June 22, 1969	London, England	Complications of a barbiturate overdose
Shorty Long	29	June 29, 1969	Detroit, Michigan, U.S.	Drowned
Brian Jones; The Rolling Stones	27	July 3, 1969	Hartfield, East Sussex, England	Drowned due to liver disfunction and ingestion
Wynonie Harris	53	July 4, 1969	Los Angeles, California, U.S.	Esophageal cancer
Roy Hamilton	40	July 20, 1969	New Rochelle, New York, U.S.	Stroke/Massive brain hemorrhage
Alexandra	27	July 31, 1969	Tellingstedt, Germany	Road accident
Theodor W. Adorno German philosopher and sociologist	65	August 6, 1969	Visp, Switzerland	Heart attack
Joseph Kosma Hungarian-French composer	63	August 7, 1969	La Roche-Guyon, France	
Miriam Licette Singer	83	August 11, 1969	Reading, Berkshire, England	
Laci Boldemann Swedish composer	48	August 18, 1969	Munich, Germany	
Josh White	55	September 5, 1969	Manhasset, New York, U.S.	Complications from surgery
Skip James	67	October 3, 1969	Philadelphia, Pennsylvania, U.S.	Unknown cancer
Natalino Otto Italian singer	56	October 4, 1969	Milan, Italy	
Leonard Chess; Record producer, record company executive and co-founder of Chess Records	52	October 16, 1969	Chicago, Illinois, U.S.	Cardiac arrest
Tommy Edwards	47	October 22, 1969	Richmond, Virginia, U.S.	Bleeding ulcer linked to cirrhosis of the liver
Pops Foster	77	October 29, 1969	San Francisco, California, U.S.	Unknown
Ivory "Deek" Watson; The 4 Tunes, The Brown Dots, The Ink Spots	60	November 4, 1969	Washington, D.C., U.S.	Unknown
Semyon Svashenko; The Actor For Aerograd	65	November 23, 1969	Moscow, USSR	Unknown
Magic Sam	32	December 1, 1969	Chicago, Illinois, U.S.	Heart attack
James "Stump" Johnson	67	December 5, 1969	St. Louis, Missouri, U.S.	Esophageal cancer
Leigh Harline American composer	62	December 10, 1969	Long Beach, California, U.S.	Complications from throat cancer
Jiří Šlitr	45	December 26, 1969	Prague, Czechoslovakia	Coal gas poisoning

== See also ==
- List of 1950s deaths in popular music
- List of 1970s deaths in popular music
- List of 1980s deaths in popular music
- List of 1990s deaths in popular music
- List of 2000s deaths in popular music
- List of 2010s deaths in popular music
- List of 2020s deaths in popular music
