= List of 1950s deaths in popular music =

The following is a list of notable performers of rock and roll music or rock music, and others directly associated with the music as producers, songwriters or in other closely related roles, who have died in the 1950s. The list gives their date, cause and location of death, and their age.

Rock music developed from the rock and roll music that emerged during the 1950s, and includes a diverse range of subgenres. The terms "rock and roll" and "rock" each have a variety of definitions, some narrow and some wider. In determining criteria for inclusion, this list uses as its basis reliable sources listing "rock deaths" or "deaths in rock and roll", as well as such sources as the Rock and Roll Hall of Fame.

Preceded by —	List of deaths in popular music 1950s	Succeeded by 1960s

Name	Age	Date	Location	Cause of death
Jaybird Coleman	53	January 28, 1950	Tuskegee, Alabama, U.S.	Cancer
Kansas Joe McCoy; Harlem Hamfats	44	January 28, 1950	Chicago, Illinois, U.S.	Heart disease
Buddy Stewart	27	February 1, 1950	Deming, New Mexico, U.S.	Car accident
Ada Brown	59	March 30, 1950	Kansas City, Kansas, U.S.	Kidney disease
Adolf Wiklund Swedish composer and conductor	70	April 2, 1950	Stockholm, Sweden	Natural causes related to his advanced age
Kurt Weill German-born American composer, best known for his collaboration with Bertolt Brecht on works such as The Threepenny Opera ( Die Dreigroschenoper )	50	April 3, 1950	New York City, New York, U.S.	Heart attack
Semyon Chernetsky Composer	68	April 13, 1950	Moscow, Russia	Death to natural causes related to his age and the general conditions of his health at that time
Vincenzo D'Annibale Italian pianist, composer and conductor	55	April 14, 1950	Naples, Italy	Lung cancer
Eduard Oja Estonian composer, conductor and violinist	45	April 16, 1950	Tartu, Estonia	Pulmonary tuberculosis
Gerald Berners Composer	66	April 23, 1950	Faringdon, UK	Natural causes related to age and progressive physical failure, after he had muttered his apologies to the doctor for having wasted his time
Gemma Bellincioni Soprano	85	April 23, 1950	Naples, Italy	
Evemero Nardella Italian composer and singer, a key figure in Neapolitan songwriting (author of music based on lyrics by Libero Bovio and Ernesto Murolo)	71	April 23, 1950	Naples, Italy	Natural causes
Bertha Hill	45	May 7, 1950	New York City, U.S.	Hit and run-related accident
Erardo Trentinaglia Italian composer	61	June 3, 1950	Venice, Italy	
Alfred Edward Moffat	86	June 6, 1950	Fulham, London, UK	
Bohumil Makovsky	71	June 12, 1950	Stillwater, Oklahoma, U.S.	
Julio Fonseca Costa Rican composer	65	June 22, 1950	San José, Costa Rica	Deteriorating health, compounded by deep grief over the death of his wife María Elena in 1948
Henry Balfour Gardiner	72	June 28, 1950	Salisbury, England	Natural causes or related to old age
Fats Navarro	26	July 7, 1950	New York City, U.S.	Tuberculosis
Papa Charlie McCoy; Harlem Hamfats	41	July 26, 1950	Chicago, Illinois, U.S.	Paralytic brain disease
Nikolaj Jakovlevič Mjaskovskij Russian composer	69	August 8, 1950	Union Soviet	
Khemchand Prakash Composer	42	August 10, 1950	Mumbai, India	
Giuseppe De Luca Italian baritone	73	August 26, 1950	Manhattan, New York, U.S.	
Al Killian American jazz trumpeter and occasional bandleader during the big band era	33	September 5, 1950	Los Angeles, California, U.S.	
Giuseppe Borgatti Italian tenor	79	October 18, 1950	Reno di Leggiuno, Varese Italy	
Al Jolson	64	October 23, 1950	San Francisco, California, U.S.	Massive heart attack
Francesco Cilea Italian composer	84	November 20, 1950	Varazze, Italy	
Raymond Grant Jr. The Four Vagabonds	34	December 13, 1950	Chicago, Illinois, U.S.	Unknown causes
John A. Pope; The Excelsior Band	87	January 18, 1951	Mauvile, Alabama, U.S.	Possibly old age
Cecil Gant	37	February 4, 1951	Nashville, Tennessee, U.S.	Pneumonia
Sid Catlett	41	March 25, 1951	Chicago, Illinois, U.S.	Heart attack
Simon Barere Russian-American pianist	54	April 2, 1951	Carnegie Hall in New York City, U.S.	Cerebral hemorrhage
Warner Baxter American actor and singer	62	May 7, 1951	Beverly Hills, California, U.S.	
Karl Heinrich David Swiss conductor and composer	66	May 17, 1951	Nervi, Italy	
Jan Ingenhoven Dutch composer and conductor	74	May 20, 1951	Hoenderloo, Netherlands	
Josef Bohuslav Foerster Czech organist, teacher and composer	91	May 29, 1951	Nový Vestec, Czechoslovakia (now the Czech Republic)	
Robert Kahn German composer and pianist	85	May 29, 1951	Biddenden, Kent, England	
Dimitrios Levidis Greek composer	66	May 29, 1951	Palaio Faliro (Athens area), Greece	
Serge Koussevitzky American conductor, double bassist, and composer	76	June 4, 1951	Boston, Massachusetts, United States	
Carl Vogler Swiss composer and organist, known for his contributions to choral and educational music	77	June 17, 1951	Zürich, Switzerland	
Armin Knab German composer and musicologist, famous in particular for his Lieder and choral works inspired by folk tradition	70	June 23, 1951	Bad Wörishofen, Bavaria, Germany	
Frank Ferera American guitarist and singer originally from Hawaii	66	June 26, 1951	Honolulu, Hawaii, United States	Stroke complications
Josef Hüttel Czech composer	57	July 6, 1951	Plzeň, Czechoslovakia	
Jørgen Bentzon Danish composer known for his modernist and chamber works	54	July 9, 1951	Hørsholm, Denmark	
Giannina Arangi-Lombardi Famous Italian soprano, gifted with an extraordinary nineteenth-century voice, particularly known for her Verdi and operatic roles	60	July 9, 1951	Milan, Italy	
Egbert Van Alstyne American ragtime composer and pianist, famous author of popular hits of the turn of the century such as "In the Shade of the Old Apple Tree"	73	July 9, 1951	Chicago, Illinois, United States	
Arnold Schönberg Austrian composer and painter naturalized American, one of the fathers of twentieth-century music and theorist of twelve-tone music	76	July 13, 1951	Los Angeles, California, United States	
Giulio Fregosi Italian baritone	64	July 17, 1951	Milan, Italy	
Max Ettinger German composer and conductor	76	July 19, 1951	Basel, Switzerland	
Gustave Slapoffski English violinist and conductor	88	August 3, 1951	Melbourne, Australia	
Ebbe Hamerik Danish composer and conductor	52	August 11, 1951	Kattegat (the sea area between Denmark and Sweden	Boating accident
Artur Schnabel Austrian pianist, composer and teacher, best known for his historic interpretations of Beethoven	69	August 15, 1951	Morschach, Switzerland	
Constant Lambert English composer and conductor, known for works such as The Rio Grande and for his role as first Music Director of the Royal Ballet	45	August 21, 1951	Marylebone, London, England	Pneumonia and undiagnosed diabetes, complicated by acute alcoholism
Roy Howard; Florida Boys	63	September 2, 1951	Canan, Blair, Pennsylvania, U.S.	Heart attack
Jimmy Yancey	56	September 17, 1951	Chicago, Illinois, U.S.	Diabetes-induced stroke.
Mirko Polič Composer and conductor/theatre director, a key figure in the promotion of opera in the Slovenian language	61	October 2, 1951	Ljubljana, Slovenia	
Luciano Neroni Italian bass, particularly active in the major opera houses of those years	42	23 October 1951	Ripatransone, Italy	
Charlie Creath Well-known American jazz trumpeter, saxophonist, and bandleader active on Mississippi ships	60	23 October 1951	Chicago, Illinois, U.S.	
Mario Zargani Italian musician, violist and violinist of Jewish origins, active in the EIAR orchestra and persecuted during fascism	55	November 4, 1951	Turin, Italy	
Nikolai Medtner Russian pianist and composer	71	November 13, 1951	London, England	
Václav Kálik Czech composer, choirmaster and pedagogue	60	November 18, 1951	Prague, Czech Republic	
Will Vodery African-American arranger, orchestrator, and composer	66	November 18, 1951	Farmingdale, New York, United States	
Mildred Bailey Famous American jazz singer, known as "The Queen of Swing"	44	December 12, 1951	Poughkeepsie, United States	
Selim Palmgren Finnish composer, pianist and conductor	73	December 13, 1951	Helsinki, Finland	
María Grever Mexican composer of popular and international music	66	December 15, 1951	New York City, U.S.	
Luigi Guida Italian composer, pianist and organist	68	December 15, 1951	Vico Equense, Naples, Italy	
Aureliano Pertile Italian tenor	79	January 11, 1952	Milan, Italy	Heart problems
Artur Kapp Estonian composer	73	January 14, 1952	Suure-Jaani, Estonia	
Arthur Farwell American composer	79	January 20, 1952	New York City, United States	
Johann Baptist Thaller German composer	79	February 2, 1952	Bad Endorf, Bavaria, Germany	Natural causes related to old age
Adela Verne Pianist, composer, and music teacher	74	February 5, 1952	London, England	
Alfred Einstein German-American musicologist and music critic	71	February 13, 1952	El Cerrito, Contra Costa County, California, United States	
Black Boy Shine	43	March 28, 1952	Sugar Land, Texas, U.S.	Tuberculosis
Jone Caciagli Italian singer known in the first half of the twentieth century	35	April 6, 1952	Milan, Italy	
Bruno Barilli Eclectic Italian composer, writer and music critic, among the founders of the magazine La Ronda	71	April 15, 1952	Rome, Italy	
Giovanni Tebaldini Italian organist, composer and musicologist	87	May 11, 1952	San Benedetto del Tronto, Ascoli, Italy	Natural causes
Vera Amerighi Rutili Italian soprano	55	May 13, 1952	Pisa, Italy	Natural causes related to her health, after leaving the stage in 1947 to devote herself to teaching
Italo Montemezzi Famous Italian composer, author of works such as L'amore dei tre re	76	May 15, 1952	Vigasio, Verona, Italy	Coronary syndrome (heart attack)
John Kirby	43	June 14, 1952	Hollywood, California, U.S.	Unknown causes
Luke Jordan	60	June 25, 1952	Lynchburg, Virginia, U.S.	Unknown causes
Henriëtte Bosmans Dutch pianist, cellist and composer of great importance	56	July 2, 1952	Amsterdam, Netherlands	
Rued Langgaard Danish composer and organist, author of the monumental Music of the Spheres	58	July 10, 1952	Ribe, Denmark	
Herbert Murrill	43	July 25, 1952	London, England	Cancer
Nino Rossi Italian pianist	56	July 27, 1952	Fortezza, Bolzano, Italy	Cerebral hemorrage
Antonio Certani Italian cellist and composer	72	July 27, 1952	Bologna, Italy	
Vincenzo Scarpetta Italian actor	75	August 3, 1952	Naples, Italy	
Maryam Jahangiri Iranian poet, musician and teacher	35	August 9, 1952	Urmia, Iran	
Nicholas Laucella American flautist and composer of Italian origin	70	September 2, 1952	New York City, U.S.	Myocardial infarction (heart attack)
Vesta Tilley Singer and actress	88	September 16, 1952	London, England	Advanced age/Natural causes
Frances Alda	73	September 18, 1952	Venice, Italy	Stroke (apoplexy)/Natural causes
Paul Hastings Allen	68	September 28, 1952	Boston, Massachusetts, United States	
Charles Draper English classical clarinetist	82	October 21, 1952	Subirton, United Kingdom	
Frederick Jacobi American composer and teacher	61	October 24, 1952	New York City, United States	
Sergei Bortkiewicz Ukrainian composer and pianist	75	October 25, 1952	Vienna, Austria	
Mike Pingitore American jazz banjo player, known for his membership in Paul Whiteman's orchestra	64	October 30, 1952	North Hollywood, Los Angeles, California, United States	
Vincent Scotto French composer of songs and soundtracks	78	November 15, 1952	Paris, France	
Albert van Raalte Dutch conductor	62	November 23, 1952	Amsterdam, Netherlands	
Jean-Fernand Vaubourgoin French composer	71	November 25, 1952	Bordeaux, France	
Antonio Guarnieri	72	November 25, 1952	Milan, Italy	
Fletcher Henderson	55	December 29, 1952	New York City, U.S.	Unknown causes
Willie Brown	52	December 30, 1952	Tunica, Mississippi, U.S.	Heart disease
Hank Williams	29	January 1, 1953	Oak Hill, West Virginia, U.S.	Acute right ventricular dilation
Big Maceo Merriweather	47	February 23, 1953	Chicago, Illinois, U.S.	Heart attack
Sergej Sergeevič Prokof'ev Russian composer, conductor and pianist who lived during the Soviet period	61	March 5, 1953	Moscow, Russia	
Vittorio Fassone Italian author and composer	81	April 4, 1953	Palermo, Italy	
Peter DeRose Composer of pop and jazz music of the first half of the twentieth century	57	April 23, 1953	New York City, United States	
Django Reinhardt	43	May 16, 1953	Fontainebleau, France	Brain hemorrhage
Virginia Talarico Italian soprano	82	June 10, 1953	Los Angeles, U.S.	
Míla Spazierová-Hezká	51	July 27, 1953	České Budějovice, Czechia	Heart condition
Betty Jack Davis; Davis Sisters	21	August 2, 1953	Cincinnati, Ohio, U.S.	Car Crash
Willie Love	46	August 19, 1953	Jackson, Mississippi, U.S.	Bronchopneumonia
Bobby Strickland; Bobby Strickland's Crusaders Quartet	33	September 24, 1953	Chattanooga, Tennessee, United States	Unknown
Walter Adams; The Drifters		October 12, 1953	U.S.	Heart attack
Carolina Slim	30	October 22, 1953	Newark, New York, U.S.	Heart attack
Sol Hoʻopiʻi	49	November 16, 1953	Either in Los Angeles, California, U.S., or in Seattle, Washington, U.S.	Unknown causes
Arnaldo Bambini Italian composer and organist	73	December 2, 1953	Verolanuova, Brescia, Italy	Natural causes
Ossy Renardy American violinist of Austrian origins	33	December 3, 1953	Route 285 near Tres Piedras, New Mexico, United States	Car accident
Daniel Gregory Mason American composer, writer, and music critic	80	December 4, 1953	Greenwich, Fairfield County, Connecticut, U.S.	
Noel Mewton-Wood Australian pianist known for his interpretations of classical and romantic music	31	December 5, 1953	London, England	Suicide by poisoning
Jorge Negrete Mexican singer and actor, a key figure in ranchera music	42	December 5, 1953	Los Angeles, California, U.S.	
Issay Dobrowen Russian pianist, composer and conductor naturalized Norwegian	62	December 9, 1953	Oslo, Norway	Long illness, after a period of poor health
Albert Coates	71	December 11, 1953	Milnerton, Cape Town, South Africa	
Frederick Thurston	52	December 12, 1953	London, England	
Gino Simi Italian musician and composer	63	December 21, 1953	Rome, Italy	
Oscar Straus Austrian composer of operettas including (A Waltz Dream)	83	January 11, 1954	Badf Ischl, Austria	
Vittorio Gnecchi Italian composer	77	February 5, 1954	Milan, Italy	
Noel Gay British composer	55	March 4, 1954	London, United Kingdom	
Louis Zimmermann Dutch violinist and composer	80	March 6, 1954	Amsterdam, Netherlands	
Lil Green	34	April 14, 1954	Chicago, Illinois, U.S.	Pneumonia
Alger "Texas" Alexander	53	April 18, 1954	Richards, Texas, U.S.	Syphilis
Arthur Johnston	56	May 1, 1954	California, United States	
Pauline de Haan-Manifarges Dutch opera singer	82	May 4, 1954	Hilversum, Netherlands	
Clemens Krauss Austrian conductor, associated with the music of Richard Strauss and the Vienna State Opera	61	May 16, 1954	Mexico City, Mexico	
Charles Ives American modernist and experimental composer known for (The Unanswered Question)	79	May 19, 1954	New York City, New York, United States	
Achille Longo Italian composer and pedagogue	54	May 28, 1954	Naples, Italy	
Pedro Elías Gutiérrez Venezuelan musician and composer known for (Alma Llanera)	84	May 31, 1954	Macuto, in the state of Vargas (now La Guaira), Venezuela	
Danny Cedrone; Bill Haley & His Comets	33	June 17, 1954	Philadelphia, Pennsylvania, U.S.	Broken neck from falling down stairs
Lollypop Jones	56	August 22, 1954	Pittsburgh, Pennsylvania, U.S.	Lengthy illness
Washington Phillips	74	September 20, 1954	Teague, Texas, U.S.	Head injury
Vernon Isley; The Isley Brothers	13	September 24, 1954	Hamilton County, Ohio, U.S.	Bicycle accident
Flor Alpaerts Belgian composer and conductor, exponent of Flemish musical nationalism	78	October 5, 1954	Antwerp, Belgium	
Hot Lips Page	46	November 9, 1954	New York City, U.S.	Unknown causes
Dink Johnson	62	November 29, 1954	Portland, Oregon, U.S.	Unknown causes
Umberto Mancini Italian composer and conductor	60	December 3, 1954	Rome, Italy	
Papa Celestin	70	December 15, 1954	New Orleans, Louisiana, U.S.	Unknown causes
Lee Morse	57	December 16, 1954	Rochester, New York, U.S.	Unknown causes
Johnny Ace	25	December 25, 1954	Houston, Texas, U.S.	Accidental self-inflicted gunshot wound
Dominicus Johner German composer, music theorist, and pedagogue	80	January 4, 1955	Beuron, Germany	
François Rasse Belgian violinist, conductor, and composer	81	January 4, 1955	Ixelles, Belgium	
Charles Cuvillier French composer of operetta	77	February 14, 1955	Paris, France	
Charlie Parker	34	March 12, 1955	New York City, U.S.	Pneumonia
Adriano Ceccarini Musician and composer	59	April 5, 1955	Viterbo, Italy	
William Henry Anderson Canadian composer, choral conductor, and teacher	72	April 12, 1955	Winnipeg, Manitoba, Canada	
Dave Peyton American jazz pianist, arranger, singer-songwriter, and bandleader	65	April 30, 1955	Huntington, West Virginia, United States	
Wardell Gray	34	May 25, 1955	Las Vegas, Nevada, U.S.	Heroin overdose
F. Melius Christiansen American composer and choral director, pioneer of a cappella choral music in the United States	84	June 1, 1955	Northfield, Minnesota, United States	
Willy Burkhard Swiss composer and teacher, a leading figure in 20th-century classical and choral music	55	June 3, 1955	Zurich, Switzerland	
Marcel Wittrisch German tenor, admired for his operatic interpretations	53	June 3, 1955	Stuttgart, Germany	
Isaak Dunaevskij Soviet composer and conductor	55	July 25, 1955	Moscow, Russia	
Ilmari Hannikainen	62	July 25, 1955	Kuhmoinen, Finland	
Carmen Miranda	46	August 5, 1955	Beverly Hills, California, U.S.	Heart attack
Frank Stokes	67	September 12, 1955	Memphis, Tennessee, U.S.	Stroke
Fumio Hayasaka	41	October 15, 1955	Tokyo, Japan	Tuberculosis
Bernardo De Muro Italian tenor, best known for his performances in the operas of Mascagni and Verdi	73	October 27, 1955	Rome, Italy	
Vladimir Deshevov Soviet composer and pianist, pioneer of avant-garde music, and author of historical operas and ballets	66	October 27, 1955	Leningrad, St. Petersburg, Russia	
Bessie Brown	65	November 12, 1955	Cleveland, Ohio, U.S.	Heart attack
James P. Johnson	61	November 17, 1955	New York City, U.S.	Unknown causes
Cow Cow Davenport	61	December 12, 1955	Cleveland, Ohio, U.S.	Atherosclerosis
Oscar "Buddy" Woods	52	December 14, 1955	Shreveport, Louisiana, U.S.	Unknown causes
Aleksandr Tichonovič Grečaninov Russian composer of classical and choral music	91	January 3, 1956	New York City, New York, United States	
Mistinguett French singer and actress, undisputed star of music hall and the Moulin Rouge	80	January 5, 1956	Bougival, France	
Philip Egner American composer	85	February 3, 1956	Seaside Park, New Jersey, United States	
John N. Klohr American trombonist and composer of band music	86	February 17, 1956	Cincinnati, Ohio, United States	
Gustave Charpentier French composer (known for the opera Louise)	95	February 18, 1956	Paris, France	
Edwin Franko Goldman American composer and bandleader	78	February 21, 1956	New York, United States	
Henriette Renié French harpist and composer, considered a virtuoso and a key figure in the teaching of the instrument	80	March 1, 1956	Paris, France	
Mihailo Vukdragović Serbian composer and conductor	85	March 3, 1956	Belgrade, Yugoslavia	
Erich Itor Kahn German pianist and composer of Jewish origin, who fled to the United States during Nazism	50	March 5, 1956	New York City, New York, United States	
Amanda Aldridge British opera singer, pianist and composer	89	March 9, 1956	London, United Kingdom	Short illness
Jack Little Composer, singer, actor, and author of such hits as "Jealous" and "A Shanty in Old Shanty Tow"	55	April 9, 1956	Hollywood, Florida, United States	
Józef Szulc Polish composer known for his operettas and sonata	81	April 10, 1956	Paris, France	
Božidar Širola Croatian composer and musicologist, pioneer of modern popular musical trends	66	April 10, 1956	Zagreb, Croatia	
Jaap Vranken Dutch organist and composer	59	April 20, 1956	Netherlands	
Lieven Duvosel Flemish composer (known for his De Leiecyclus)	78	April 20, 1956	Sint-Martens-Latem or Ghent, Belgium	
Nemesio Otaño Spanish composer, organist and educator	75	April 29, 1956	San Sebastián, Basque, Spain	
Ferdinando Maberini Italian composer and priest, known above all for his production of sacred music	69	May 14, 1956	Sarzana, Italy	
Clifford Brown	25	June 26, 1956	Bedford, Pennsylvania, U.S.	Car crash
Richie Powell	24	June 26, 1956	Bedford, Pennsylvania, U.S.	Car crash
Vladimir Grigoryevich Zakharov Soviet composer and conductor, known for his work with the Red Army Choir	54	July 13, 1956	Moscow, Russia	
Adrian Rollini	52	July 15, 1956	Florida, United States	
Miguel Bernal Jiménez Mexican composer, organist and pedagogue, a reference figure for sacred and symphonic music	46	July 26, 1956	León, Mexico	
Valaida Snow African-American jazz singer and trumpeter, also known as "Little Louis"	51	July 30, 1956	New York City, New York, United States	Brain hemorrhage
John Latouche Lyricist and librettist, known for writing the libretto for the opera The Ballad of Baby Doe	41	August 7, 1956	Calais, Vermont, United States	
Jaroslav Řídký Czech composer, harpist and teacher	58	August 14, 1956	Poděbrady , Czechoslovakia	
Bertolt Brecht	58	August 14, 1956	East Berlin, Germany	Heart attack
Bela Lugosi	73	August 16, 1956	Los Angeles, California, United States	Heart attack
Yves Nat French pianist and composer	65	August 31, 1956	Paris, France	
Gerald Finzi British composer, known for his lyrical style and choral and orchestral masterpieces such as Dies natalis	55	September 27, 1956	Oxford, England	
Lorenzo Perosi Musician	83	October 12, 1956	Rome, Italy	
Isham Jones American saxophonist, conductor and composer, author of jazz standards and very popular songs such as "Star Dust" and "It Had To Be You"	62	October 19, 1956	Hollywood, Florida, United States	Cancer
Tommy Johnson	60	November 1, 1956	Crystal Springs, Mississippi, U.S.	Heart attack
Art Tatum	47	November 5, 1956	Los Angeles, California, U.S.	Uremia
Tommy Dorsey	51	November 26, 1956	Greenwich, Connecticut, U.S.	Choking in sleep
Henri Fillmore	75	December 7, 1956	Miami, Florida, United States	
Lonnie Barron	25	January 9, 1957	Muttonville, Michigan, United States	Murder
Arturo Toscanini Italian conductor	89	January 16, 1957	Riverdale, New York, U.S	Cerebral thrombosis
Rudolph Reti American composer and pianist	71	February 7, 1957	Montclair, New Jersey, United States	
Józef Hofmann	81	February 16, 1957	Los Angeles, California, United States	Pneumonia
Marika Ninou	35	February 23, 1957	Athens, Greece	Cancer
Othmar Schoeck Swiss composer and conductor	70	March 8, 1957	Zurich, Switzerland	Heart attack
Fud Livingston American clarinetist	50	March 25, 1957	New York City, New York, United States	
William Henley	83	April 13, 1957	Woking, Surrey, England	
Pedro Infante Mexican singer and actor, icon of the Golden Age of Mexican cinema and star of ranchera music	39	April 15, 1957	Mérida, Yucatán, Mexico	Plane crash
Romeo Gavioli	44	April 17, 1957	Montevideo, Uruguay	Suicide
Olallo Morales Spanish-Swedish pianist, conductor and composer	82	April 29, 1957	Sweden	Natural causes
Ludwig Schiedermair German musicologist known for his important studies on Beethoven	80	April 30, 1957	Bergisch Gladbach, Germany	
Tadeusz Zygfryd Kassern Polish composer	53	May 2, 1957	New York, United States	Cancer (tumor)
Mikhail Gnesin Russian composer	74	May 5, 1957	Moscow, Soviet Union, Russia	Natural causes related to his advanced age
Ezio Pinza Famous Italian operatic bass and successful singer	64	May 9, 1957	Stamford, Connecticut, United States	Heart attack and stroke
Shalva Azmayparashvili Georgian composer and conductor	54	May 17, 1957	Tbilisi, Georgia	
Palghat Rama Bhagavathar Indian Carnatic classical singer and musician	68	May 26, 1957	Kalpathi (Kalakkad), Kerala, India	Natural causes related to age or a common death for the time
George Bacovia Romanian poet and composer	75	May 29, 1957	Bucharest, Romania	Progressive physical decline due to advanced age, long-standing fragile health and a life marked by chronic depression
Ralph Willis	47	June 11, 1957	New York City, U.S.	Unknown causes
Jimmy Dorsey	53	June 12, 1957	New York City, U.S.	Throat cancer
Serge Chaloff	33	July 16, 1957	Boston, Massachusetts, U.S.	Spinal cancer
Joe Hill Louis	35	August 5, 1957	Memphis, Tennessee, U.S.	Tetanus
Dennis Brain A celebrated British horn player, considered an absolute virtuoso who popularized the horn as a solo instrument	36	September 1, 1957	Hatfield, England	Car accident
Jean Sibelius Finnish composer of the late Romantic period, author of masterpieces such as Finland and his seven symphonies	91	September 20, 1957	Ainola, Järvenpää, Finland	Cerebral hemorrhage after collapsing at home
Luis Cluzeau-Mortet Uruguayan composer, violist, and pianist, known for his nationalist and Romantic-Expressionist works	68	September 28, 1957	Montevideo, Uruguay	Natural causes
Natanael Berg Swedish composer known primarily for his operas and symphonic compositions	78	October 14, 1957	Stockholm, Sweden	Natural causes related to his advanced
Ralph Benatzky Austrian composer of Czech origins, author of numerous highly successful soundtracks, songs and operettas, including the very famous The White Horse (L'Auberge du Cheval Blanc)	73	16 October, 1957	Zurich, Switzerland	
Luigi Galimberti Italian violin maker	68	19 October, 1957	Milan, Italy	Throat disease
Walter Rehberg Swiss pianist	57	24 October, 1957	Zürich, Switzerland	
Joseph Canteloube French composer and musicologist	78	November 4. 1957	Grigny, France	Natural causes after a severe illness, rather than an accident or foul play
Ettore Pozzoli Italian pianist and composer, known above all for his important texts on music teaching and solfeggio	84	November 9, 1957	Seregno, Italy	
Erich Wolfgang Korngold Austrian-born American composer, conductor and pianist, famous both for his operatic masterpieces ( Die tote Stadt ) and for his award-winning Hollywood soundtracks	60	November 29, 1957	Hollywood, California, United States	Cerebral hemorrhage (stroke)
Beniamino Gigli Famous Italian tenor, one of the most beloved and celebrated opera singers of the first half of the twentieth century worldwide	67	November 30, 1957	Rome, Italy	Cardiac arrest (heart attack)
Dick McPartland American jazz guitarist, active in the Chicago scene of the 1920s	52	November 30, 1957	Elmhurst, Illinois, United States	
Walter Page	57	December 20, 1957	New York City, U.S.	Kidney ailment and pneumonia
Ernie Henry	31	December 29, 1957	Brooklyn, New York, U.S.	Heroin overdose
David Broekman Dutch musician and composer	55	January 1, 1958	Fifth Avenue, Manhattan, New York City, United States	Heart attack
Alec Rowley British composer and pianist	65	January 11, 1958	Shepperton, Surrey, England,	
Arthur Shepherd American composer, conductor and teacher	77	January 12, 1958	Cleveland, Ohio, United States	
John Dolphin; Record label owner, concert promoter and music producer	55	February 1, 1958	Los Angeles, California, U.S.	Murdered
W. C. Handy	84	March 28, 1958	New York City, U.S.	Bronchial pneumonia
Chuck Willis	32	April 10, 1958	Atlanta, Georgia, U.S.	Peritonitis
Leroy Foster	35	May 26, 1958	Chicago, Illinois, U.S.	Heart attack
Matteo Marangoni Italian art historian and composer	81	June 1, 1958	Pisa, Italy	
Henri Pensis Luxembourgish conductor, composer and violinist	57	June 1, 1958	Brussels, Belgium	Following a final concert appearance at Expo 58 and a subsequent heart attack
Lily Strickland American composer and recording artist	71	June 6, 1958	Hendersonville, North Carolina, United States	
Gonzalo Curiel Mexican pianist and composer, particularly active during the golden age of Mexican cinema		July 4, 1958	Mexico City, Mexico	Heart attack on his fifty-fourth birthday
Erwin Stein Austrian conductor	72	July 19, 1958	London, United Kingdom	Natural causes related to his age
Percy Scholes British critic, educator and musicologist, famous for compiling the first volume of the Oxford Companion to Music	81	July 31, 1958	Vevey, Switzerland	Sudden death, which occurred unexpectedly
Big Bill Broonzy	65	August 14, 1958	Chicago, Illinois, U.S.	Cancer
Aarre Merikanto Finnish composer	65	September 28, 1958	Helsinki, Finland	Lung cancer
Pino Spotti Italian composer	40	October 6, 1958	Milan, Italy	Following a sudden and devastating illness, which led to a death that was considered premature at the time
Alexander Moiseevich Veprik Soviet composerand music theorist of Jewish origin	59	October 13, 1958	Moscow, Soviet Union, Russia	Heart problems
Michalis Souyioul Greek composer and singer-songwriter, a leading figure in Greek theatre and cinema music	52	October 16, 1958	Athens, Greece	Stroke
Carli Densmore Elinor Conductor and composer, best known for his film scores during the silent film era in Hollywood	68	October 20, 1958	Hollywood, California, United States	
Itzikl Kramtweiss Russian-born, naturalized American musician, specialized in the traditional genre ofklezmer music	92	October 23, 1958	Philadelphia, Pennsylvania, United States	
Gennaro Fantastico Italianpainter and tenor	76 or 77	October 30, 1958	Salice Salentino, Lecce, Italy	
Tiny Bradshaw	51	November 26, 1958	Cincinnati, Ohio, U.S.	Stroke
Julia Lee	56	December 8, 1958	Kansas City, Missouri, U.S.	Heart attack
Henry "Son" Sims	68	December 26, 1958	Memphis, Tennessee, U.S.	Complications from renal surgery
José Enrique Pedreira Puerto Rican composer known for his dances	54	January 6, 1959	San Juan, Puerto Rico, United States	
Edwin A. Fleisher American philanthropist and music patron	81	January 9, 1959	Philadelphia, Pennsylvania, United States	
Lamar Stringfield	61	January 21, 1959	Asheville, North Carolina, United States	Lung congestion following a severe cold
Viktor Josef Keldorfer	85	January 28, 1959	Vienna, Austria	
Buddy Holly; Buddy Holly & The Crickets	22	February 3, 1959	Clear Lake, Iowa, U.S.	Plane crash
The Big Bopper	28	February 3, 1959	Clear Lake, Iowa, U.S.	Plane crash
Ritchie Valens	17	February 3, 1959	Clear Lake, Iowa, U.S.	Plane crash
Guitar Slim	32	February 7, 1959	New York City, U.S.	Pneumonia
Lester Young	49	March 15, 1959	New York City, U.S.	Bleeding from alcoholism
Charles Borel-Clerc French composer and oboist, known for popular hits and operettas of the period	79	April 9, 1959	Cannes, France	
Eduard van Beinum Dutch conductor	58	April 13, 1959	Amsterdam, Netherlands	Fatal heart attack
Edward Johnson Canadian tenor and theatre impresario	80	April 20, 1959	Guelph, Ontario, Canada	
Jef van Hoof Flemish composer and conductor	72	April 24, 1959	Antwerp, Belgium	
Sidney Bechet	62	May 14, 1959	Garches, France	Lung cancer
Ole Windingstad Norwegian conductor, pianist and composer	73	June 3, 1959	Kingston, New York, United States	
Boris Vian French composer and music teacher	39	June 23, 1959	Paris, France	Sudden cardiac arrest/Heart failure due to a long-standing heart condition linked to childhood rheumatic fever
Jean Gallon French composer and music teacher	80	June 23, 1959	Paris, France	
Renato Virgilio Italian pianist, composer and conductor	79	June 27, 1959	Wiesbaden, Germany	
Lazare Saminsky Russian-American composer and conductor	76	June 30, 1959	Port Chester, New York, United States	
Billie Holiday	44	July 17, 1959	New York City, U.S.	Liver cirrhosis
Blind Willie McTell	61	August 19, 1959	Milledgeville, Georgia, U.S.	
Agnes Nicholls English soprano	82	September 21, 1959	London, England	Stroke
Josef Matthias Hauer Austrian composer and musicologist	76	September 22, 1959	Vienna, Austria	
Jane Winton American actress and dancer	53	September 22, 1959	The Pierre Hotel, New York City, New York, United States	Undisclosed causes
Ennio Porrino Italian composer	49	September 25, 1959	Rome, Italy	Sudden illness (often referred to in historical records as a sudden death)
Gerard Hoffnung British comedian, illustrator, and tubist	34	September 28, 1959	Hampstead, London, England	Cerebral haemorrhage (stroke)
Mario Lanza	38	October 7, 1959	Rome, Italy	Heart attack
Al "Cake" Wichard	40	November 14, 1959	Los Angeles, California, U.S.	Unknown causes
Robin Milford	56	December 29, 1959	Lyme Regis, England	Committed suicide

== See also ==
- List of 1960s deaths in popular music
- List of 1970s deaths in popular music
- List of 1980s deaths in popular music
- List of 1990s deaths in popular music
- List of 2000s deaths in popular music
- List of 2010s deaths in popular music
- List of 2020s deaths in popular music
