= List of 1970s deaths in popular music =

The following is a list of notable performers of rock and roll music or rock music, and others directly associated with the music as producers, songwriters or in other closely related roles, who have died in the 1970s. The list gives their date, cause and location of death, and their age.

Rock music developed from the rock and roll music that emerged during the 1950s, and includes a diverse range of subgenres. The terms "rock and roll" and "rock" each have a variety of definitions, some narrow and some wider. In determining criteria for inclusion, this list uses as its basis reliable sources listing "rock deaths" or "deaths in rock and roll", as well as such sources as the Rock and Roll Hall of Fame.

Preceded by 1960s	List of deaths in popular music 1970s	Succeeded by 1980s

Name	Age	Date	Location	Cause of death
Alexander Sharp; The Orioles	50	January 3, 1970	Orange County, Florida, United States	Heart attack
Frank Graziosi; The Hours Of Night	19	January 10, 1970	Chu Lai, Vietnam	Helicopter crash
William Cathey; The Soul Kings	27	January 17, 1970	Selma, North Carolina, U.S.	Car crash
Rico Hightower; The Soul Kings	27	January 17, 1970	Selma, North Carolina, U.S.	Car crash
Billy Stewart; The Soul Kings	32	January 17, 1970	Selma, North Carolina, U.S.	Car crash
Norman Rich; The Soul Kings	39	January 17, 1970	Selma, North Carolina, U.S.	Car crash
L. C. McKinley	51	January 19, 1970	East Chicago, Indiana, U.S.	Natural causes
James "Shep" Sheppard; Shep and the Limelites	34	January 24, 1970	Long Island Expressway, New York, U.S.	Gunshot wounds after attempted robbery
James "Big Jim" Strong; Nolan Strong & the Diablos	34	January 29, 1970	Detroit, Michigan, United States	Unknown
Slim Harpo	46	January 31, 1970	Baton Rouge, Louisiana, U.S.	Heart attack
Ishmon Bracey	71	February 12, 1970	Jackson, Mississippi, U.S.	Unknown
Darrell Banks	32	February 24, 1970	Battle Creek, Michigan, U.S.	Shot to death by police
Jackie Opel	32	March 9, 1970	Bridgetown, Barbados	Car crash
Tammi Terrell	24	March 16, 1970	Philadelphia, Pennsylvania, U.S.	Brain tumor
Mary Ann Ganser; The Shangri-Las	22	March 16, 1970	Forest Hills, New York, U.S.	Heroin overdose
Kid Thomas	35	April 5, 1970	Los Angeles, California, U.S.	Shot to death
Mike Klingner; The Rebels, The Nomads	24	April 6, 1970	Laos	Plane shot down while serving Vietnam war
George Goldner	52	April 15, 1970	Turtle Bay, New York, U.S.	Heart attack
Sheppard "Shep" Grant; The Wanderers	40	April 18, 1970	New York City, U.S.	Unknown
Earl Hooker	40	April 21, 1970	Chicago, Illinois, U.S.	Tuberculosis
Otis Spann	40	April 24, 1970	Chicago, Illinois, U.S.	Liver cancer
Frankie Lee Sims	53	May 10, 1970	Dallas, Texas, U.S.	Pneumonia
Johnny Hodges	62	May 11, 1970	New York City, New York, U.S.	Heart attack
Earl Grant	39	June 10, 1970	Interstate 10, Lordsburg, New Mexico, U.S.	Car crash
Lonnie Johnson	71	June 16, 1970	Toronto, Canada	
Grady Pannel; Electric Toilet	20	June 23, 1970	Searcy, State of Arkansas, U.S.	Car crash
Wayne Reynolds; Electric Toilet	26	June 23, 1970	Searcy, State of Arkansas, U.S.	Car crash
Roger Edens American composer	64	July 13, 1970	Hollywood, Los Angeles, California, United States	Cancer
Luis Mariano Spanish-French tenor	55	14 July, 1970	Paris, France	
Preston Foster American actor and singer	69	14 July, 1970	San Diego, California, United States	Long illness
Sir John Barbirolli British conductor and cellist, longtime director of the Hallé Orchestra and Arturo Toscanini's successor as conductor of the New York Philharmonic	70	July 29, 1970	London, United Kingdom	
George Szell Hungarian-American conductor and composer	73	July 30, 1970	Cleveland, United States	Heart failure and bone cancer, diagnosed after hospitalization beginning in June 1970 following a tour of the Far East
Bob Vail; The Jays	22	August 8, 1970	Denver, Colorado, U.S.	Drug overdose
Soledad Miranda	27	August 18, 1970	Lisbon, Portugal	Car crash
Booker Ervin	39	August 31, 1970	New York City, U.S.	
Nuccia Bongiovanni Italian singer	40	September 2, 1970	Milan, Italy	
Alan Wilson; Canned Heat	27	September 3, 1970	Topanga Canyon, California, U.S.	Suicide or accidental barbiturate overdose
Jacques Pills	64	September 12, 1970	Paris, France	Heart attack
Maxwell Davis	54	September 18, 1970	Los Angeles, California, U.S.	Non-Hodgkin's lymphoma
Jimi Hendrix; The Jimi Hendrix Experience	27	September 18, 1970	Kensington, London, England	Asphyxiation on vomit after consuming an unhealthy amount of barbiturates
Janis Joplin; Big Brother and the Holding Company	27	October 4, 1970	Los Angeles, California, U.S.	Heroin overdose
Baby Huey; Baby Huey & the Babysitters	26	October 28, 1970	Chicago, Illinois, U.S.	Drug induced heart attack
Agustín Lara	73	November 6, 1970	Mexico City, Mexico	
Albert Ayler	34	November 25, 1970	New York City, New York, U.S.	Presumed suicide
George "Smitty" Smith; Original lead singer for The Manhattans	30	December 16, 1970	New Jersey, United States	Brain tumor
Coot Grant	77	December 26, 1970	Riverside County, California, U.S.	Unknown
Lenny McKay; The Jesters	15	1971	Harlem, New York City, United States	Unknown
Hobart Dotson	48	January 1, 1971	Brooklyn, New York, United States	Unknown
Jack Elliott	56	January 3, 1971	Los Angeles, California, U.S.	Brain tumor
Jean-Paul Mauric	37	January 5, 1971	Marseille, France	Complications of cardiomyopathy
Alexander Tsfasman Russian composer and jazz pianist	59	February 20, 1971	Moscow, USSR	Complications from heart failure
William Lava American composer and arranger, known for his scores for Warner Bros. cartoons	59	February 20, 1971	Los Angeles, California, United States	
Adolph Weiss American bassoonist and composer of contemporary classical music	79	February 21, 1971	Van Nuys, California, United States	
Rudolf Mauersberger German choirmaster	82	February 22, 1971	Dresden, Germany	
Josef Berg Czech composer and musicologist	43	February 26, 1971	Brno, Czechoslovakia	
"Fiddlin'"Arthur Smith American violinist and old-time musician	72	February 28, 1971	Louisville, Kentucky, United States	
Harold McNair; Ginger Baker's Air Force	39	March 7, 1971	London, England	Lung cancer
Francis Wolff	63	March 8, 1971	New York City, New York, U.S.	Heart attack following surgery
Arlester "Dyke" Christian; Dyke and the Blazers	27	March 13, 1971	Phoenix, Arizona, U.S.	Shot to death
Wynton Kelly	39	April 12, 1971	Toronto, Ontario, Canada	Epileptic seizure
Carmen Lombardo; Younger brother of Guy Lombardo	67	April 17, 1971	Miami, Florida, U.S.	Undisclosed cancer
Dickie Valentine	41	May 6, 1971	Glangrwyney, Wales	Car accident
Don McPherson; The Main Ingredient	29	May 6, 1971	The Bronx, New York, United States	Leukemia
Libby Holman American singer and actress	67	June 18, 1971	Stamford, Connecticut, United States	Suicide
Jim Morrison; The Doors	27	July 3, 1971	Paris, France	Heart failure brought on by heroin addiction
Louis Armstrong	69	July 6, 1971	New York City, New York, U.S.	Heart attack
Charlie Shavers	53	July 8, 1971	Hollywood, California, U.S.	Throat cancer
Ted Fio Rito American composer	70	July, 22 1971	Scottsdale, Arizona, United States	
Henry D. "Homer" Haynes; Homer and Jethro	51	August 7, 1971	Hammond, Indiana, U.S.	Heart attack
Lefty Baker; Spanky And Our Gang	29	August 11, 1971	California, U.S.	Enlarged liver
King Curtis	37	August 13, 1971	New York City, New York, U.S.	Stabbed to death
Thomas Wayne	31	August 15, 1971	Memphis, Tennessee, U.S.	Car crash
Gisela Hernández Cuban composer	58	August 23, 1971	Havana, Cuba	
Lil Hardin Armstrong	73	August 27, 1971	Chicago, Illinois, U.S.	Heart attack
Gary Buckley; The Jury	20	August 27, 1971	Ogden, Iowa, United States	Car crash
Tony Clarke	31	August 28, 1971	Detroit, Michigan, U.S.	Murdered by his wife
Curtis Jones American pianist	65	September 11, 1971	Munich, Germany	
Jaikishan Panchal Indian composer	41	September 12, 1971	Bombay, Maharashtra, India	
Alessandro Ravelli Italian composer and musician	91	September 14, 1971	Tirrenia, Pisa, Italy	
Gene Vincent	36	October 12, 1971	Newhall, California, U.S.	Burst peptic ulcer
Pavel Bayerle	46	October 16, 1971	Olomouc, Czechoslovakia	While performing
Duane Allman; The Allman Brothers Band, Derek and the Dominos	24	October 29, 1971	Macon, Georgia, U.S.	Motorcycle collision
Rafael Suarez Mujica (Fucho)	41	October 30, 1971	Caracas, Venezuela	Unknown
Art Laibly; Record producer and manager	77	October 30, 1971	Arlington Heights, Cook County, Illinois, United States	Unknown
Irene Daye	53	November 1, 1971	Greenville, South Carolina, U.S.	Cancer
Junior Parker	39	November 18, 1971	Blue Island, Illinois, U.S.	Following surgery for brain tumor
Papa Lightfoot	47	November 20, 1971	Natchez, Mississippi, U.S.	Respiratory failure
Jiri Grossman	30	December 5, 1971	Prague, Czechoslovakia	Lymphoma
Charlie Fuqua; The Ink Spots	61	December 21, 1971	New Haven, Connecticut, U.S.	Unknown
Mick Parsons; Renaissance	24	1972	Bodicote, Oxfordshire, England	Car accident
Sonny Norton; The Crows	39 or 40	1972	New York City, U.S.	Unknown
Red Smiley	46	January 2, 1972	Bryson City, North Carolina, U.S.	Diabetes
Ross Bagdasarian Sr. "David Seville", creator of The Chipmunks	52	January 16, 1972	Beverly Hills, California, U.S.	Heart attack
Big Maybelle	47	January 23, 1972	Cleveland, Ohio, U.S.	Complications of diabetes and coma
Mahalia Jackson	60	January 27, 1972	Evergreen Park, Illinois, U.S.	Heart failure and diabetes
Gianni Caia; Free Love	20	February 1, 1972	Calabria, Italy	Car crash
Steve Stogel; Free Love	23	February 1, 1972	Calabria, Italy	Car crash
Mick Bradley; Steamhammer, Methuselah	25	February 8, 1972	United Kingdom	Leukemia
Lee Morgan	33	February 19, 1972	New York City, New York, U.S.	Shot.
"Scarface" John Williams; Huey Smith and the Clowns	33	March 4, 1972	St. Andrew and Rampart Streets in New Orleans, Louisiana, United States	Murdered
Linda Jones	27	March 14, 1972	Newark, New Jersey, U.S.	Complications of diabetes
Smitty Gatlin; The Oak Ridge Boys	36	March 20, 1972	Nashville, Tennessee, U.S.	Cancer
Phil King; Booking agent for The Blue Öyster Cult	24	April 27, 1972	New York City, U.S.	Possibly shot
Pete Watson; The Phantoms, M.P.D	27	April 30, 1972	Perth, Australia	Chronic illness
Doles Dickens	56	May 2, 1972	Somewhere in New Jersey, U.S.	Unknown
Leslie Harvey; Stone the Crows	27	May 3, 1972	Swansea, Wales	Electrocuted by a live microphone on stage
Reverend Gary Davis	76	May 5, 1972	Hammonton, New Jersey, U.S.	Heart attack
Big John Greer	48	May 12, 1972	Hot Springs, Arkansas, U.S.	Alcoholism
Tanguito	27	May 19, 1972	Buenos Aires, Argentina	Hit by oncoming train
John Ryanes; The Monotones	32	May 30, 1972	Newark, New Jersey, U.S.	Unknown
Jimmy Rushing	70	June 8, 1972	New York City, New York, U.S.	Leukemia and blood cancer
Herb Coleman	44	June 12, 1972	Cannes, France	Shot
Clyde McPhatter; Billy Ward and His Dominoes, The Drifters	39	June 13, 1972	Teaneck, New Jersey, U.S.	Alcohol related complications/ Heart attack
Felipe Pirela	30	July 2, 1972	Santurce, Puerto Rico	Shot
Mississippi Fred McDowell	66	July 3, 1972	Memphis, Tennessee, U.S.	Undisclosed
Lovie Austin	84	July 10, 1972	Chicago, Illinois, U.S.	Unknown
Brother Joe May	59	July 14, 1972	Thomasville, Georgia, U.S.	Stroke
Bobby Ramirez; Edgar Winter's White Trash	24	July 24, 1972	Thomasville, Georgia, U.S.	Stroke
Brian Cole; The Association	29	August 2, 1972	Los Angeles, California, U.S.	Heroin overdose
Joi Lansing	43	August 7, 1972	Santa Monica, California, U.S.	Breast cancer
Baby Tate	56	August 17, 1972	Columbia, South Carolina, U.S.	Heart attack
Lale Andersen	67	August 29, 1972	Vienna, Austria	Liver cancer
Joey Hall; Little Joey & The Flips	19	September , 1972	West Philadelphia, Pennsylvania	Unknown
Calvin Frazier	57	September 23, 1972	Detroit, Michigan, U.S.	Undisclosed
Rory Storm	34	September 28, 1972	Stoneycroft, Liverpool, England	Suicide (disputed)
Billy Williams	61	October 12, 1972	Chicago, Illinois, U.S.	Heart attack
Christine Frka; The GTOs	22	November 5, 1972	Cohasset, Massachusetts, U.S.	Drug overdose
Billy Murcia; The New York Dolls	21	November 6, 1972	London, England	Accidental suffocation due to alcohol abuse
Raymond Jackson; Record producer for Stax Records	31	November 10, 1972	Memphis, Tennessee, United States	Burned to death in a house fire
Berry Oakley; The Allman Brothers Band	24	November 11, 1972	Macon, Georgia, U.S.	Motorcycle collision
Danny Whitten; Crazy Horse	29	November 18, 1972	Los Angeles, California, U.S.	Barbiturate & alcohol overdose
Carl Stalling American composer	81	November 29, 1972	Los Angeles, California, U.S	
William Manuel Johnson	100	December 3, 1972	New Braunfels, Texas, U.S.	Unknown
Melvin Lastie	42	December 4, 1972	New Orleans, Louisiana, U.S.	Cancer
Kenny Dorham	48	December 5, 1972	New York City, New York, U.S.	Kidney disease
Jeffrey Carp	24	January 1, 1973	The Caribbean or Gulf of Mexico	Drowned during a boating accident
Kid Ory	86	January 23, 1973	Honolulu, Hawaii, U.S.	Pneumonia and a heart attack
Cornelius "Tenoo" Coleman	44	February 20, 1973	New Orleans, Louisiana, U.S.	Stroke
Ron "Pigpen" McKernan; Grateful Dead	27	March 8, 1973	Corte Madera, California, U.S.	Gastrointestinal hemorrhage associated with alcoholism
Duke Henderson	48	April 9, 1973	Pacoima, Los Angeles, California, U.S.	Heart failure
Sammy Babitzin	24	April 29, 1973	Jyväskylä, Finland	Visceral injuries caused by car accident
Mike Furber; Mike Furber and the Bowery Boys	25	May 10, 1973	Sydney, Australia	Suicide by hanging
Valery Mulyavin; Pesnyary	34	June 14, 1973	Yalta, Ukraine	Drowned
Margie Hendrix; The Cookies, The Raelettes	38	July 14, 1973	New York City, U.S.	Heroin overdose
Clarence White; The Kentucky Colonels, The Byrds	29	July 14, 1973	Palmdale, California, U.S.	Hit by a drunk driver
Nelly Fioramonti Italian singer	34	July 19, 1973	Rome, Italy	
Jimmy Radcliffe	36	July 27, 1973	The Bronx, New York, U.S.	Kidney complications
Roger Lee Durham; Percussionist for Bloodstone	27	July 27, 1973	Fort Leavenworth, Kansas, United States	Injuries following falling off a horse
Memphis Minnie	76	August 6, 1973	Memphis, Tennessee, U.S.	Stroke
Paul Williams; The Temptations	34	August 17, 1973	Detroit, Michigan, U.S.	Gunshot wound (disputed suicide)
Gram Parsons; The Byrds, The Flying Burrito Brothers	26	September 19, 1973	Joshua Tree, California, U.S.	Morphine and alcohol related heart failure
Jim Croce	30	September 20, 1973	Natchitoches, Louisiana, U.S.	Plane crash
Maury Muehleisen; Jim Croce's lead guitarist	24	September 20, 1973	Natchitoches, Louisiana, U.S.	Plane crash
Sister Rosetta Tharpe	58	October 9, 1973	Philadelphia, Pennsylvania, U.S.	Stroke
Gene Krupa	64	October 16, 1973	Yonkers, New York, U.S.	Leukemia and blood cancer
Zeke Zettner; The Stooges	25	November 10, 1973	Detroit, Michigan	Heroin overdose
Allan Sherman	48	November 20, 1973	Los Angeles, California, U.S.	Respiratory failure
John Rostill; The Shadows	31	November 26, 1973	Radlett, Hertfordshire, England	Suicide
Bobby Darin	37	December 20, 1973	Los Angeles, California, U.S.	Complications of cardiac bypass surgery
Lowman Pauling; The Five Royales	47	December 26, 1973	Manhattan, New York City, New York, U.S.	Epileptic seizure
Packy Axton; The Mar-Keys	32	January 20, 1974	Memphis, Tennessee, U.S.	Cirrhosis or heart attack
Bobby Bloom	28	February 28, 1974	Hollywood, California, U.S.	Accidentally shot himself
Bobby Timmons	38	March 1, 1974	New York City, New York, U.S.	Cirrhosis of the liver
Harry Womack; The Valentinos	28	March 9, 1974	Los Angeles, California, U.S.	Stabbed to death
Roy Hawkins	71	March 19, 1974	Compton, California, U.S.	Cirrhosis of the liver
Arthur Crudup	68	March 28, 1974	Nassawadox, Virginia, U.S.	Complications of cardiovascular disease and diabetes
Vincent Taylor; Sha Na Na	24	April 17, 1974	Charlottesville, Virginia, U.S.	Heroin overdose
Graham Bond; The Graham Bond Organisation, Ginger Baker's Air Force	36	May 8, 1974	London, England	Suicide by subway train
Duke Ellington	75	May 24, 1974	New York City, New York, U.S.	Pneumonia and lung cancer
Sidney Campbell English organist, composer, and director of music at St George's Chapel, Windsor Castle	65	June 4, 1974	Windsor, England	
Rodolfo Lipizer Italian violinist and composer	79	June 8, 1974	Gorizia, Italy	
Eddy Brown American violinist and teacher	78	June 14, 1974	Abano Terme, Italy	
Ada Bruges Italian singer	76	June 14, 1974	Naples, Italy	
Brother Bones (Freeman Davis) American musician	71	June 14, 1974	Long Beach, Los Angeles County, California, United States	
Darius Milhaud French composer and teacher, member of the famous group Les Six	81	June 22 ,1974	Geneva, Switzerland	
Don Rich; The Buckaroos	32	July 17, 1974	San Luis Obispo, California, U.S.	Motorcycle crash
Gene Ammons	49	July 23, 1974	Chicago, Illinois, U.S.	Undisclosed
Lightnin' Slim	61	July 27, 1974	Detroit, Michigan, U.S.	Stomach cancer
Cass Elliot; The Mamas & the Papas	32	July 29, 1974	London, England	Heart failure
Bill Chase; Chase	39	August 9, 1974	Jackson, Minnesota, U.S.	Plane crash
Wallace "Wally" Yohn; Chase	27	August 12, 1974	Jackson, Minnesota	Plane crash
Tina Brooks	42	August 13, 1974	New York City, New York, U.S.	Liver failure
Robbie McIntosh; Average White Band	24	September 23, 1974	Los Angeles, California, U.S.	Drug overdose
Pink Anderson	74	October 12, 1974	Spartanburg, South Carolina, U.S.	Heart attack
Victor Olof; Record producer for Decca Records and His Master's Voice	76	November 3, 1974	Milford on Sea, Hampshire, England	Unknown
Ivory Joe Hunter	60	November 8, 1974	Memphis, Tennessee, U.S.	Lung cancer
Nick Drake	26	November 25, 1974	Tanworth-in-Arden, Warwickshire, England	Suicide by acute amitriptyline overdose
Hugues Panassié French record producer and music critic, founder of the Hot Club de France and key figure in the popularization of traditional jazz in Europe	62	December 8, 1974	Montauban, France	
Billy Reid (William Gordon Reid) English composer, multi-instrumentalist and bandleader of the traditional pop scene	72	December 12, 1974	Southampton, England	
Erich Walter Sternberg German-Israeli composer	83	December 15, 1974	Tel Aviv, Israel	
André Jolivet French composers of the twentieth century, known for his style influenced by mysticism and his interest in ancient cultures	69	December 20, 1974	Paris, France	
Farid al-Atrash Egyptian-Syrian composer and singer	64	December 26, 1974,	Beirut, Lebanon	Heart attack
George Linstead Musician	66	December 28, 1974	Sheffield, South Yorkshire, England	
Ezra Carter; Manager of the Carter Family	76	January 22, 1975	Madison, Tennessee, United States	Unknown
Umm Kulthum	76	February 3, 1975	Cairo, Egypt	Cerebral hemorrhage
Louis Jordan; Louis Jordan and His Tympany Five	66	February 4, 1975	Los Angeles, California, U.S.	Heart attack
Dave Alexander; The Stooges	27	February 10, 1975	Ann Arbor, Michigan, U.S.	Pulmonary edema from alcohol abuse
J. B. Long	71	February 25, 1975	Elon, North Carolina, U.S.	Unknown
T-Bone Walker	64	March 16, 1975	Los Angeles, California, U.S.	Stroke/Bronchial pneumonia
Walter Vinson	74	April 22, 1975	Chicago, Illinois, U.S.	
Pete Ham; Badfinger	27	April 24, 1975	Surrey, England	Suicide by hanging
Tom Donahue; Rock and roll radio disc jockey	46	April 29, 1975	San Francisco, California, United States	Heart attack
Bob Wills	70	May 13, 1975	Fort Worth, Texas, U.S.	Pneumonia
Tim Buckley	28	June 29, 1975	Santa Monica, California, U.S.	Heroin overdose
Chan Daniels; The Highwaymen	35	July 2, 1975	Belmont, Kent County, Michigan, U.S.	Pneumonia
George Morgan	51	July 7, 1975	Madison, Nashville, Tennessee, U.S.	Heart attack
Don Robey; Record producer	71	July 16, 1975	Houston, Texas, U.S.	Heart attack
Lefty Frizzell	47	July 19, 1975	Nashville, Tennessee, U.S.	Stroke
Fran O'Toole; The Miami Showband	28	July 31, 1975	A1 road at Buskhill, County Down, Northern Ireland	Ambushed and murdered
Tony Geraghty; The Miami Showband	24	July 31, 1975	A1 road at Buskhill, County Down, Northern Ireland	Ambushed and murdered
Brian McCoy; The Miami Showband	32	July 31, 1975	A1 road at Buskhill, County Down, Northern Ireland	Ambushed and murdered
Cannonball Adderley	46	August 8, 1975	Gary, Indiana, U.S.	Cerebral hemorrhage
Otto Jeffries; The Five Royales	63	August 8, 1975	Winston-Salem, North Carolina, U.S.	Unknown
Bill Potter Singer	52	September 5, 1975	Orange, Texas, United States	
Bill Sprouse Jr. Singer	26	September 5, 1975	Oceanside, San Diego, County California, United States	
Gianni D'Errico Italian singer-songwriter	26	September 7, 1975	Ostuni, Italy	
Franz Salmhofer Austrian composer	75	September 22, 1975	Vienna, Austria	
Al Jackson, Jr. Booker T. & the MG's	39	October 1, 1975	Memphis, Tennessee, U.S.	Murder
Oliver Nelson	43	October 28, 1975	Los Angeles, California, U.S.	Heart attack
Fiddlin' Joe Martin	75	November 2, 1975	Walls, Mississippi, U.S.	Unknown
Vittoria Mongardi Italian singer, actress and model	49	November 26, 1975	Bologna, Italy	
Gary Thain; The Keef Hartley Band, Uriah Heep	27	December 8, 1975	Norwood Green, England	Heroin overdose
Hound Dog Taylor	60	December 17, 1975	Chicago, Illinois, U.S.	Lung cancer
Howlin' Wolf	65	January 10, 1976	Hines, Illinois, U.S.	Congestive heart failure
Chris Kenner	46	January 25, 1976	New Orleans, Louisiana, U.S.	Heart attack
Rudy Pompilli; Bill Haley & His Comets	51	February 5, 1976	Philadelphia, Pennsylvania, U.S.	Lung cancer
Vince Guaraldi	47	February 6, 1976	Menlo Park, California, U.S	Heart attack
Percy Faith	67	February 9, 1976	Encino, California, U.S	Cancer
Sal Mineo	37	February 12, 1976	West Hollywood, California, U.S.	Stabbed to death
Florence Ballard; The Supremes	32	February 22, 1976	Detroit, Michigan, U.S.	Coronary thrombosis and cardiac arrest
Arthur Gunter	49	March 16, 1976	Port Huron, Michigan, U.S.	Pneumonia
Luther "Georgia Boy" Johnson	41	March 18, 1976	Boston, Massachusetts, U.S.	Lung cancer
Paul Kossoff; Free, Back Street Crawler	25	March 19, 1976	Flight from New York to Los Angeles, U.S.	Pulmonary embolism/Lung blood clot
Jimmy Garrison	42	April 7, 1976	New York City, New York, U.S.	Lung cancer
Phil Ochs	35	April 9, 1976	New York City, New York, U.S.	Suicide by hanging
William Bobo; The Dixie Hummingbirds	54	April 28, 1976	Philadelphia, Pennsylvania, United States	Unknown
Keith Relf; The Yardbirds	33	May 12, 1976	London, England	Electrocuted by a guitar
Charles Stepney; Record producer and arranger	45	May 17, 1976	Chicago, Illinois, U.S.	Heart attack
Gwynneth Ashley Robin; South African Folk and Country singer	15	May 21, 1976	Phalaborwa, South Africa	Plane crash
Melvin Jackson	60	May 30, 1976	Dallas, Texas, U.S.	Car crash
Cecilia	27	August 2, 1976	Quiruelas de Vidriales, Castile and León, Spain	Car crash
Jimmy Reed	50	August 29, 1976	Oakland, California, U.S.	Epileptic seizure
L. C. Robinson	61	September 26, 1976	Berkeley, California, U.S.	Heart attack
Connee Boswell; The Boswell Sisters	68	September 26, 1976	Manhattan, U.S.	Cancer
Leo Mintz; Record store and music promoter	65	November 4, 1976	Cleveland, Ohio, U.S.	Unknown
Rossano Attolico Italian singer	30	December 3, 1976	New York, U.S.	
Tommy Bolin; Deep Purple, The James Gang, Zephyr	25	December 4, 1976	Miami, Florida, U.S.	Heroin and alcohol overdose
Freddie King	42	December 28, 1976	Dallas, Texas, U.S.	Stomach ulcer and pancreatitis
Franco Pisano Italian composer, conductor and guitarist	54	January 6, 1977	Rome, Italy	Liver cancer
Buddy Johnson	62	February 9, 1977	New York City, New York, U.S.	Brain tumor and sickle cell anemia
Nolan Strong; Nolan Strong & the Diablos	43	February 21, 1977	Detroit, Michigan, U.S.	Unknown
Bukka White	77	February 26, 1977	Memphis, Tennessee, U.S.	Undisclosed
Abdel Halim Hafez	47	March 30, 1977	London, England	Liver failure
Achim Kirchhoff; Scorpions	28	April 1, 1977	Germany	Alcoholism
Annette Snell	32	April 4, 1977	New Hope, Georgia, U.S.	Southern Airways Flight 242 plane crash
Julius Watkins	55	April 4, 1977	Short Hills, New Jersey, U.S.	Diabetes
Scott Bradley American composer, pianist, and conductor	85	April 27, 1977	Chatswort, California, U.S.	
Helmut Köllen; Triumvirat	27	May 3, 1977	Cologne, Germany	Carbon monoxide poisoning
Lafayette Thomas	48	May 20, 1977	Brisbane, California, U.S.	Heart attack
Paul Desmond	52	May 30, 1977	New York City, New York, U.S.	Lung cancer
Sleepy John Estes	78	June 5, 1977	Brownsville, Tennessee, U.S.	Stroke
Lally Stott	32	June 6, 1977	Liverpool, U.K.	Traffic accident
Peter Laughner; Pere Ubu	24	June 22, 1977	Cleveland, Ohio, U.S.	Acute pancreatitis from alcohol poisoning
Baby Boy Warren	57	July 1, 1977	Detroit, Michigan, U.S.	Heart attack
Big John Wrencher	54	July 15, 1977	Clarksdale, Mississippi, U.S.	Heart attack
Richie Kamuca	46	July 22, 1977	Los Angeles, California, U.S.	Cancer
Milt Buckner	62	July 27, 1977	Chicago, Illinois, U.S.	Heart attack
Elvis Presley	42	August 16, 1977	Memphis, Tennessee, U.S.	Cardiac arrhythmia
Tarheel Slim	63	August 21, 1977	New York City, New York, U.S.	Pneumonia brought on by chemotherapy
Ethel Waters	80	September 1, 1977	Los Angeles, California, U.S.	Uterine cancer
George Barnes	56	September 5, 1977	Concord, California, U.S.	Heart attack
Mercy Baby	47	September 10, 1977	Dallas, Texas, U.S.	Gunshot wound
Leopold Stokowski British conductor	95	September 13, 1977	Nether Wallop, Hampshire, England	Heart attack (coronary attack)
Marc Bolan; T. Rex	29	September 16, 1977	London, England	Traffic accident
Shirley Brickley; The Orlons	33	October 13, 1977	Philadelphia, Pennsylvania, U.S.	Shot to death by home intruder
Bing Crosby	74	October 14, 1977	Alcobendas, Spain	Heart attack
Cassie Gaines; Lynyrd Skynyrd	29	October 20, 1977	Gillsburg, Mississippi, U.S.	Plane accident
Steve Gaines; Lynyrd Skynyrd	28	October 20, 1977	Gillsburg, Mississippi, U.S.	Plane accident
Ronnie Van Zant; Lynyrd Skynyrd	29	October 20, 1977	Gillsburg, Mississippi, U.S.	Plane accident
Peg Leg Sam	65	October 27, 1977	Jonesville, South Carolina, U.S.	Unknown
Guy Lombardo	75	November 5, 1977	Houston, Texas, U.S.	Heart attack
Rahsaan Roland Kirk	42	December 5, 1977	Bloomington, Indiana, U.S.	Stroke
Big Chief Ellis	63	December 20, 1977	Birmingham, Alabama, U.S.	Heart failure
St. Louis Jimmy Oden	74	December 30, 1977	Chicago, Illinois, U.S.	Bronchopneumonia
Leslie Sullivan; Radio host for the RBC	61 or 62	1978	Rhodesia	Unknown
Frank Moll; The Chesterfield Kings	20	1978	Rochester, U.S.	Intestine osteosarcoma
Terry Kath; Chicago	31	January 23, 1978	Los Angeles, California, U.S.	Accidentally shot himself
Vic Ames; Ames Brothers	52	January 28, 1978	Nashville, Tennessee, U.S.	Car crash
Gregory Herbert	30	January 31, 1978	Amsterdam, Netherlands	Drug overdose
Jorge Cafrune Argentine singer	40	February 1, 1978	Benavídez, Buenos Aires, Argentina	
Dimitrie Cuclin Romanian composer, musicologist and pedagogue	92	February 7, 1978	Bucharest, Romania	
Julio Jaramillo Ecuadorian singer	42	February 9, 1978	Guayaquil, Ecuador	
Alex Bradford American composer	51	February 15, 1978	Newark, New Jersey, United States	
Pankaj Mullick	72	February 19, 1978	Calcutta, India	
Mrs. Mills (Gladys Mills) Pianist	59	February 24, 1978	London, United Kingdom	
Vadim Salmanov Composer	65	February 27, 1978	St. Petersburg, Russia	
Johnny Wallace; The Four Knights	65	March 2, 1978	Los Angeles, California, United States	Unknown
Cesare Andrea Bixio Italian composer	81	March 5, 1978	Rome, Italy	
Bill Kenny; The Ink Spots	63	March 23, 1978	New Westminster, Canada	Respiratory illness
Money Johnson	60	March 28, 1978	New York City, New York, U.S.	Heart attack
Ray Noble	74	April 2, 1978	London, England	Cancer
Sandy Denny	31	April 21, 1978	London, England	Cerebral hemorrhage after accidental fall
Liane Augustin	50	April 30, 1978	Vienna, Austria	Severe bleeding after abdominal surgery
Gerry Shury	33	May 24, 1978	Surrey, England	Traffic accident
Matty Matlock	71	June 12, 1978	Los Angeles, California, U.S.	Complications from Parkinson's disease
Juke Boy Bonner	46	June 29, 1978	Houston, Texas, U.S.	Cirrhosis
Sam Pottle; Composer for Sesame Street and co-composer of "The Muppet Show Theme"	44	July 4, 1978	Great Barrington, Massachusetts, U.S.	Heart attack
Glenn Goins; Parliament-Funkadelic	24	July 29, 1978	Plainfield, New Jersey, U.S.	Hodgkin's lymphoma
Louis Prima	67	August 24, 1978	New Orleans, Louisiana, U.S.	Cerebral hemorrhage
Joe Negroni; Frankie Lymon & The Teenagers	37	September 5, 1978	New York City, New York, U.S.	Cerebral hemorrhage
Al Benson; Radio disc jockey, music promoter and record label owner	70	September 6, 1978	Three Oaks, Michigan, U.S.	Unknown
Tom Wilson; Record producer	47	September 6, 1978	Los Angeles, California, U.S.	Heart attack
Keith Moon; The Who	32	September 7, 1978	London, England	Drug overdose
Johnny O'Keefe	43	October 6, 1978	Darlinghurst, New South Wales, Australia	Heart attack
Jacques Brel	49	October 9, 1978	Boubigny, France	Pulmonary embolism
Mel Street	45	October 21, 1978	Hendersonville, Tennessee, United States	Suicide by gunshot
Maybelle Carter; Carter Family, The Carter Sisters	69	October 23, 1978	Hendersonville, Tennessee, U.S.	Respiratory disease
Lennie Tristano	59	November 18, 1978	New York City, New York, U.S.	Heart attack
Blanche Calloway	76	December 27, 1978	Baltimore, Maryland	Breast cancer
Chris Bell; Big Star	27	December 27, 1978	East Memphis, Tennessee, U.S.	Traffic accident
Tuza Mthethwa; Member of The Soul Brothers	21	January 8, 1979	Free State and Gauteng, South Africa	Car accident
Mpompie Sosibo; Member of The Soul Brothers	31	January 8, 1979	Free State and Gauteng, South Africa	Car accident
Charles Mingus	56	January 8, 1979	Cuernavaca, Mexico	
Sara Carter; Carter Family	80	January 8, 1979	Lodi, California, U.S.	Unknown
Donny Hathaway	33	January 13, 1979	New York City, New York, U.S.	Suicide or accidental fall
Gustav Winckler	53	January 20, 1979	Viborg, Denmark	Car accident
Grant Green	43	January 31, 1979	New York City, New York, U.S.	Heart attack
Sid Vicious; Sex Pistols	21	February 2, 1979	New York City, New York, U.S.	Drug overdose (possible suicide)
Mike Patto; Timebox, Patto, Spooky Tooth, Boxer	36	March 4, 1979	South Norfolk, England	lymphatic leukemia
Freddy Owens; Saxophonist for Bill Deal and the Rhondels	29	March 4, 1979	Richmond, Virginia, U.S.	Shot to death
Dany Dauberson	54	March 16, 1979	Marseille, France	Long-term complications of a car crash in 1967
Roy Montrell	51	March 16, 1979	Amsterdam, Netherlands	Drug overdose
Zenon De Fleur; Guitarist for The Count Bishops	27	March 17 or 18, 1979	London, England	Car crash and subsequent medical complications
Joe Willie Wilkins	56 or 58	March 28, 1979	Memphis, Tennessee, U.S.	Meningitis
Nino Rota Italian composer	67	April, 10, 1979	Rome, Italy	Coronary Thrombosis
Doug Rauch; Bassist for Santana	28	April 23, 1979	San Francisco, California, U.S.	Drug overdose
James Leroy	32	May 10, 1979	Ottawa, Ontario, Canada	Suicide
Blue Mitchell	49	May 21, 1979	Los Angeles, California, U.S.	Cancer
Jack Haley; The Tin Man from The Wizard of Oz	80	June 6, 1979	Los Angeles, California, U.S.	Heart attack
Darla Hood; Our Gang	47	June 13, 1979	North Hollywood, California, U.S.	Heart failure from hepatitis
Ahmad Zahir; Afghan country and folk singer	33	June 14, 1979	Salang Tunnel, Afghanistan	Unknown, possibly car accident or assassination
Lowell George	34	June 29, 1979	Arlington, Virginia, U.S.	Heart attack
Van McCoy	39	July 6, 1979	Englewood, New Jersey, U.S.	Heart attack
Minnie Riperton; Rotary Connection	31	July 12, 1979	Los Angeles, California, U.S.	Breast cancer
Vladimir Shurygin; Sinyaya Ptitsa	24	July 25, 1979	Kaluga, Russia, USSR	Suicide
Dorsey Burnette the Rock and Roll Trio	46	August 19, 1979	Los Angeles, California, U.S.	Coronary thrombosis
Jimmy McCulloch; Paul McCartney & Wings	26	September 27, 1979	London, England	Morphine poisoning
Gus Cannon	96	October 15, 1979	Memphis, Tennessee, U.S.	Unknown
Tiki Fulwood; Parliament-Funkadelic	35	October 29, 1979	Washington, U.S.	Stomach cancer
John Glascock; Carmen, Jethro Tull	28	November 17, 1979	London, England	Congenital heart defect
Judee Sill	35	November 23, 1979	North Hollywood, Los Angeles, California, U.S.	Either suicide by speedball overdose or accidental speedball overdose
Jackie Brenston	49	December 15, 1979	Memphis, Tennessee, U.S.	Heart attack
Voyle Gilmore; Record producer from Capitol Records	67	December 19, 1979	Brentwood, California, United States	Unknown

== See also ==
- List of 1950s deaths in popular music
- List of 1960s deaths in popular music
- List of 1980s deaths in popular music
- List of 1990s deaths in popular music
- List of 2000s deaths in popular music
- List of 2010s deaths in popular music
- List of 2020s deaths in popular music
