= List of 2020s deaths in popular music =

The following is a list of notable performers of rock music and other forms of popular music, and others directly associated with the music as producers, songwriters, or in other closely related roles, who died in the 2020s decade. The list gives their date, cause and location of death, and their age.

Rock music developed from the rock and roll music that emerged during the 1950s and includes a diverse range of subgenres. The terms "rock and roll" and "rock" each have a variety of definitions, some narrow and some wider. In determining criteria for inclusion, this list uses as its basis reliable sources listing "rock deaths" or "deaths in rock and roll", as well as such sources as the Rock and Roll Hall of Fame.

Preceded by 2010s	List of deaths in popular music 2020s	Succeeded by —

== See also ==
- 27 Club
- List of murdered hip hop musicians
- List of 1950s deaths in popular music
- List of 1960s deaths in popular music
- List of 1970s deaths in popular music
- List of 1980s deaths in popular music
- List of 1990s deaths in popular music
- List of 2000s deaths in popular music
- List of 2010s deaths in popular music
