= Itzikl Kramtweiss =

Russian-born American klezmer musician

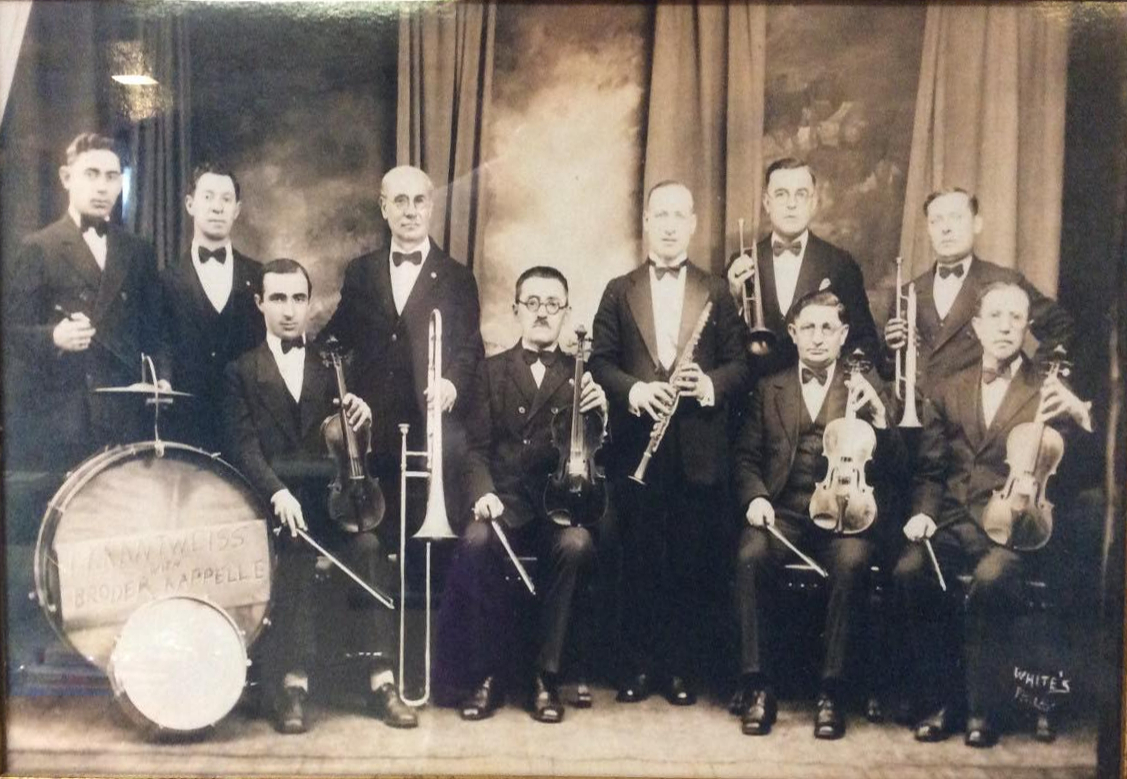
Broder Kapelle, Philadelphia klezmer group, 1920s

Itzikl Kramtweiss (c. 1878 - 1958) or Krantweiss, also known by the anglicized name Isadore Krantweiss, was a Russian-born American klezmer musician and recording artist of the early twentieth century. He was leader of the Broder Kapelle, a popular klezmer orchestra in Philadelphia which made recordings for the Victor Recording Company in the late 1920s.

== Biography ==
Kramtweiss was born in January 1876 or 1878, in Teplyk, Podolian Governorate, Russian Empire. By 1906 he was living in Ternopil, Galicia, Austria-Hungary, and was married to his wife Sarah (Schewa, née Noten). In 1913 he emigrated to the United States, landing in Boston in May of that year. He apparently stayed in Boston for at least three years, as his son Harry was born there in 1916. By 1918 he had relocated to Trenton, New Jersey, where he ran a music store.

In Philadelphia, where he settled by 1919, he became known as a klezmer clarinetist. It was in 1929 that he finally entered the studio with his own orchestra at Victor Records in Camden, New Jersey and recorded roughly six sides which were sold as the Broder Kapelle. These recordings included klezmer bulgars as well as polkas. In the 1930s he remained a popular player in the city's Jewish music circuit. He had a reputation as a "wild character". He also gained work due to his birthplace; the Teplyk Landsmanshaft regularly hired him and Cornet player Nachman Grossman.

He died on October 1, 1958.
