= The Delta Rhythm Boys =

American vocal group

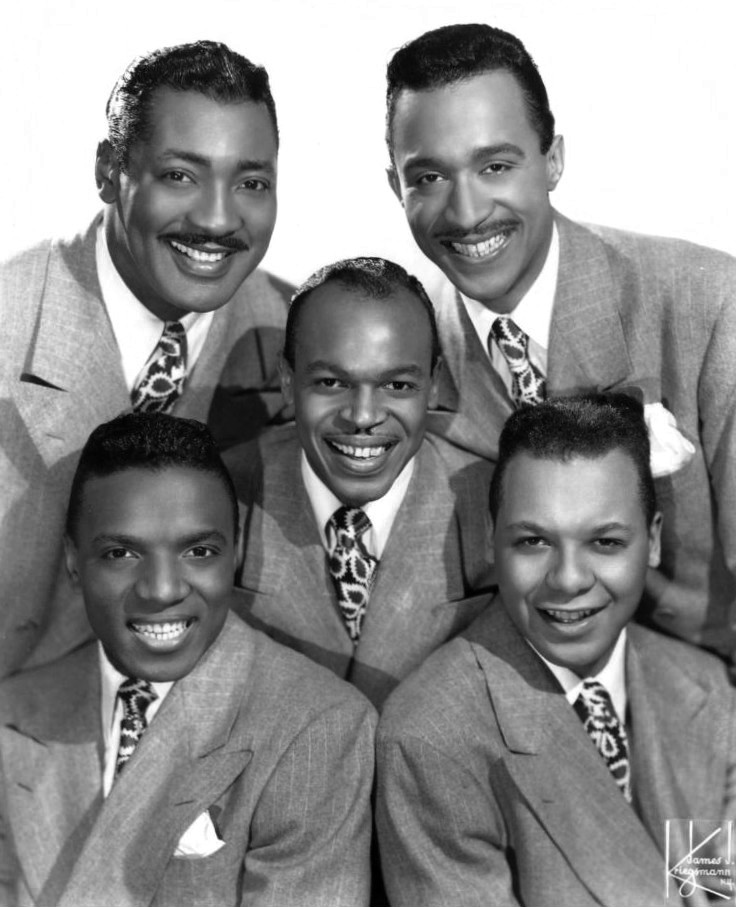
- The quartet with pianist Rene DeKnight. Top left to right: Lee Gaines, DeKnight. Center: Carl Jones. Bottom left to right: Traverse Crawford, Kelsey Pharr.

Background information
- Genres: R&B, jazz, gospel, doo-wop
- Years active: 1934–1987

The Delta Rhythm Boys were an American vocal group active from 1934 to 1987.

The group was formed at Langston University in Langston, Oklahoma, in 1934 by Carl Jones, Traverse Crawford, Otha Lee Gaines, and Kelsey Pharr. They moved to Dillard University in New Orleans, Louisiana, in 1936 and worked there under Frederick Hall as the Frederick Hall Quintet and the New Orleans Quintet.

They performed on radio programs such as Amos and Andy and The Joan Davis Show, and performed on Broadway in the shows Sing Out the News and Hot Mikado. The group appeared extensively in 15 films. They resettled permanently in Europe in 1956.

Lee Gaines died of cancer in Helsinki, Finland on July 15, 1987. At Gaines's funeral (on July 22, 1987), Hugh Bryant collapsed while performing, and died, apparently from a heart attack.

== Personnel ==
Bass

- 1934–1987: Lee Gaines

First tenor

- 1934–1944: Elmaurice Miller
- 1940–1944: Clinton Holland
- 1944–1960: Carl Jones (died September 21, 2010)
- 1960–1974: Herb Coleman (died June 12, 1974)
- 1974–1987: Walter Trammell

Second tenor

- 1934–1975: Traverse Crawford
- 1975–1987: Ray Beatty

Baritone

- 1934–1940: Joseph "Essie" Adkins
- 1940–1943: Harry Lewis
- 1943–1960: Kelsey Pharr (died April 20, 1961)
- 1951–1954: Clifford Holland (temporary replacement for Pharr)
- 1962–1987: Hugh Bryant

Pianist

- 1934–1987: Rene DeKnight (died January 24, 2004.)
