= Quiruelas de Vidriales =

Coordinates: 42°01′N 5°49′W

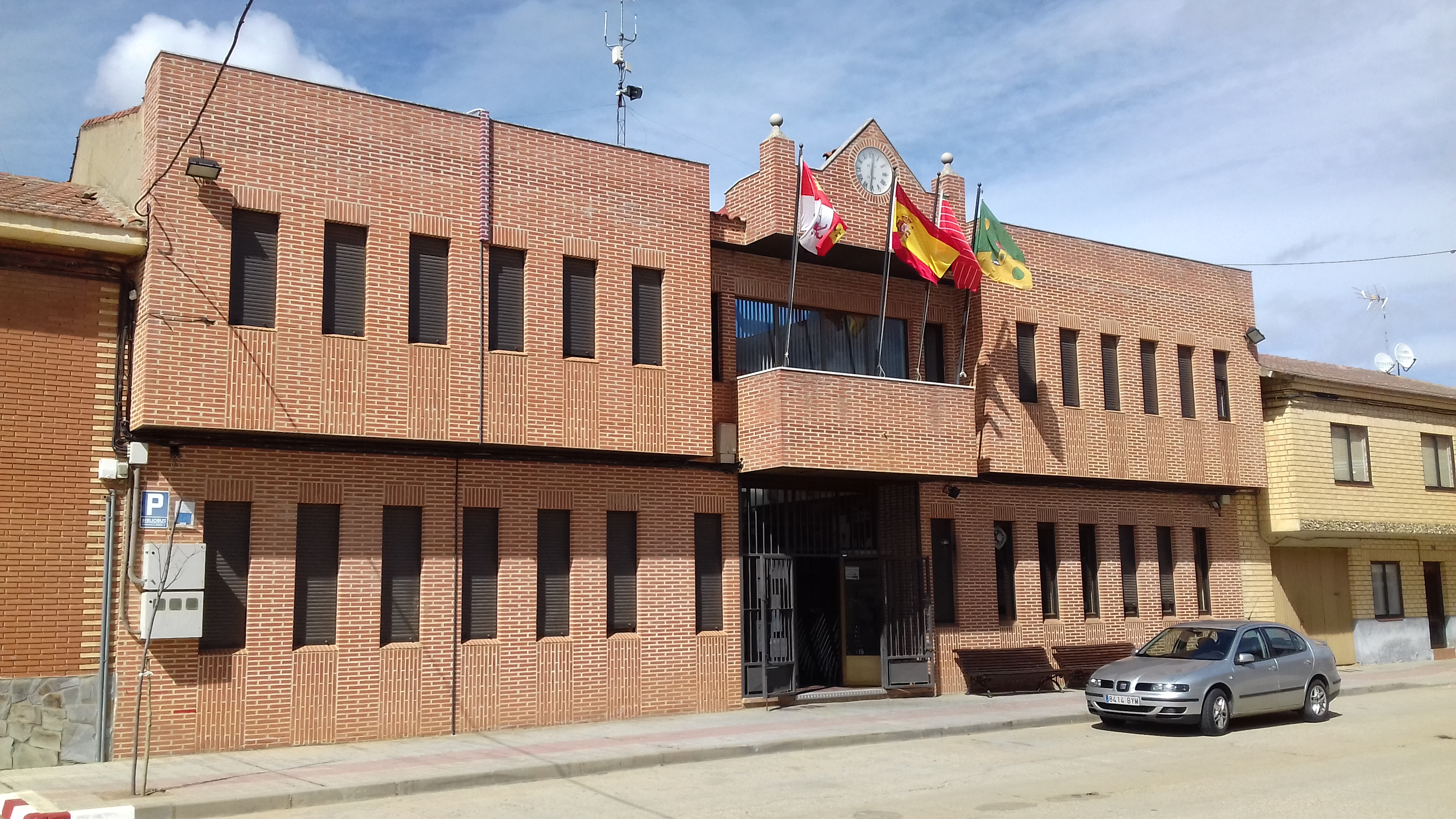
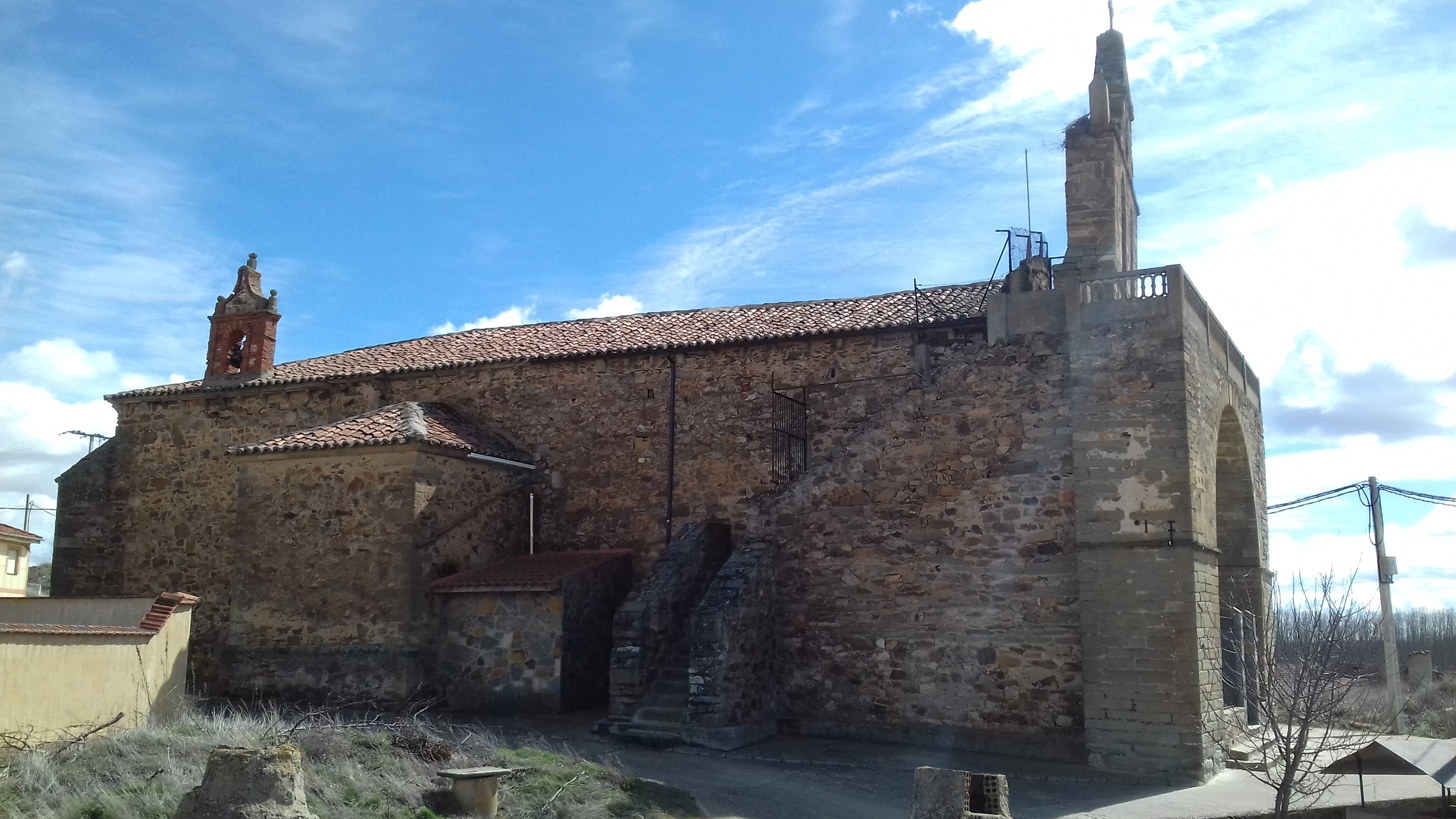
- Top down: City Hall and parish church.

- Flag Coat of arms
- Interactive map of Quiruelas de Vidriales
- Country: Spain
- Autonomous community: Castile and León
- Province: Zamora
- Municipality: Quiruelas de Vidriales

Area
  - Total: 28 km^{2} (11 sq mi)

Population (2025-01-01)
  - Total: 615
  - Density: 22/km^{2} (57/sq mi)
- Time zone: UTC+1 (CET)
  - Summer (DST): UTC+2 (CEST)
- Website: Official website

Quiruelas de Vidriales is a municipality located in the province of Zamora, Castile and León, Spain. According to the 2004 census (INE), the municipality has a population of 934 inhabitants.
