= Pat Kilroy =

American musician

- Born: Patrick Anthony Kilroy; July 5, 1943; San Francisco, California, US
- Died: December 25, 1967 (aged 24) San Francisco, California, US
- Genres: Folk, psychedelic music
- Occupation: Singer-songwriter
- Years active: 1964–1967
- Labels: Elektra

Patrick Anthony Kilroy (July 5, 1943 – December 25, 1967) was an American singer-songwriter, whose 1966 album on Elektra Records, Light of Day, has been called the "first ever acid folk album".

== Life and musical career ==
Kilroy was born in San Francisco. After leaving San Francisco's Galileo High School in the summer of 1962, Pat Kilroy enrolled at the University of California at Berkeley where he would later meet Susan Graubard. By early 1964 Kilroy began making appearances on the Bay Area folk scene, initially with Debbie Green, at clubs such as the Cabale Creamery. However, before completing his schooling, Kilroy moved down the coast to Big Sur Hot Springs and the Esalen Institute, and by the summer of 1965 Susan Graubard and, soon to be housemate, Bob Amacker would also arrive at Big Sur Hot Springs. In the fall Amacker moved to New York City, soon to be followed by Kilroy and, in January 1966, by Graubard. In New York, they entered the studio to begin recording Kilroy's "Light of Day" album with Graubard on flute and glockenspiel and Amacker on tabla. Kilroy and Graubard then traveled to Europe and Morocco, before returning to New York to complete the album with additional musicians including guitarists Stefan Grossman and Marc Silber, and Eric Kaz on harmonica.

The album, Light of Day, released in October 1966, contained material all composed by Pat Kilroy using a wide range of instrumentation including jaw harp and congas, as well as improvised vocals. According to Kilroy's sleeve notes, the album drew on Middle Eastern and Indian influences, as well as his experiences of living on the coast at Big Sur. Although the album was not commercially successful, it has subsequently been suggested as an influence on similar music recorded later by The Incredible String Band (who Kilroy and Graubard had met whilst staying with their producer Joe Boyd in London), Sandy Bull and Tim Buckley.

Having returned to Berkeley in July 1966, Kilroy and Graubard were joined by Jeffrey Stewart, becoming "The New Age". The first performances were in early August and they went on to perform regularly at the Jabberwock coffee shop, playing between bands at The Fillmore and in support of many San Francisco Bay Area groups including Country Joe and the Fish, Quicksilver Messenger Service and Steve Miller Band. They played with the Grateful Dead amongst others at the Human Be-In on January 14, 1967, when they were described as playing "way out Indian-type stuff" and were joined on stage by Country Joe McDonald singing harmony.

In May 1967, The New Age traveled to Los Angeles, playing at The Kaleidoscope and performing a few shows on Sunset Strip. They were in town to feature in the Culver City filming of the Arthur Dreifuss-directed movie The Love-Ins. Kilroy, Graubard and Stewart had all learned to play eastern instruments and in the late summer and early fall of 1967 they entered Warner Brothers Studios in Los Angeles and recorded a number of "improvised psychedelic acoustic" tracks which went unissued for several decades.

== Death and legacy ==
Following a short illness, Kilroy died of Hodgkin's lymphoma on Christmas Day 1967, aged 24. Contrary to some reports, Country Joe McDonald's song "Pat's Song" was not written as a tribute to Kilroy; but "Colors for Susan" was written for Susan Graubard.

A tribute was written by Stefan Grossman called Requiem for Patrick Kilroy which appears on his 1969 album Gramercy Park Sheik. The piece reflects Patrick Kilroy's own avant-guarde style.

After many years as a rare record prized by collectors, Light of Day was reissued on CD by Collector's Choice Music. The Warner Brothers recordings made by Kilroy with The New Age in 1967 were rediscovered by Susan Graubard (now Susan Archuletta), and released in 2007 under the title The New Age – All Around.

== Discography ==
=== Light of Day (1966) ===
Label - Elektra - EKS 7311

Track listing

1. The Magic Carpet - 2:02
2. Roberta's Blues - 2:36
3. Cancereal - 4:24
4. A Day At The Beach - 3:43
5. The Pipes Of Pan - 2:37
6. Mississippi Blues - 3:39
7. Vibrations - 3:15
8. Light Of Day - 3:00
9. The Fortune Teller - 2:46
10. Canned Heat - 3:01
11. The River - 4:09
12. Star Dance - 1:58

Pat Kilroy - Vocals, guitar

Susan Graubard - flute/glockenspiel

Stefan Grossman - guitar

Eric Kaz - mouth harp

Bob Amacker - percussion
