= Kelsey Pharr =

American rhythm and blues singer

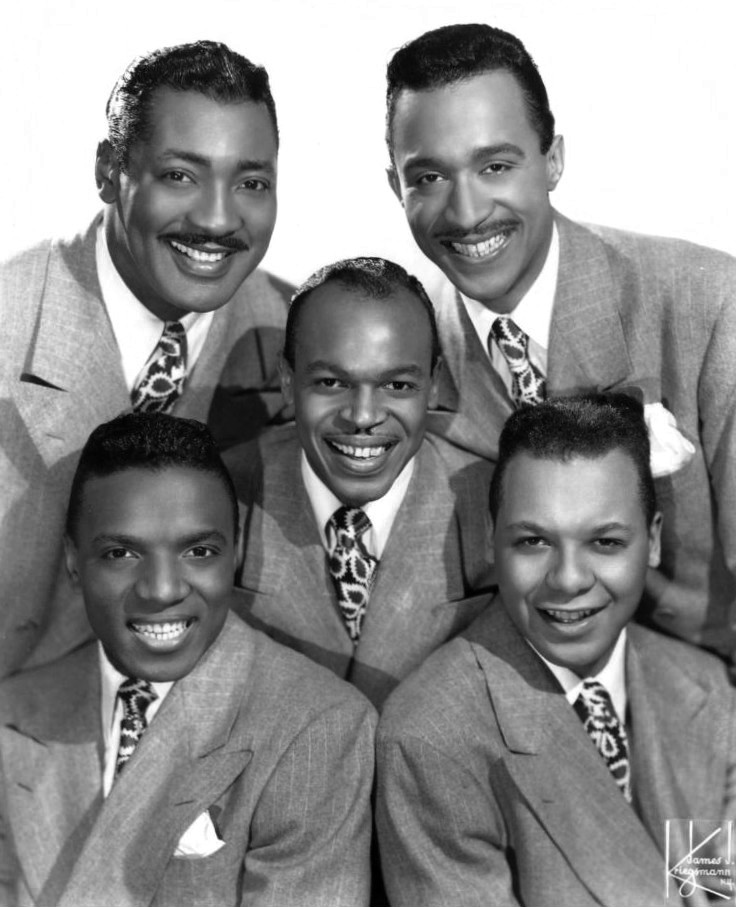
Delta Rhythm Boys, The quartet with pianist Rene DeKnight. Top l to r: Lee Gaines, DeKnight. Center: Carl Jones. Bottom l to r: Traverse Crawford, Kelsey Pharr.

Kelsey Pharr (January 10, 1917 – April 20, 1961) was a Rhythm and Blues singer, known as a member of the Delta Rhythm Boys.

== Biography ==
Kelsey L. Pharr Jr. was born in Miami on January 10, 1917, the son of Kelsey Leroy Pharr, a prominent retired mortician and active in the Afro-American civil rights campaign, who, in 1939, was interviewed by Bertha R. Comstock for the Life History Project at the Library of Congress.

He attended Dunbar High School in Washington, DC. At Dunbar, he held the rank of Colonel of the Cadet Corps. He graduated as the valedictorian of his class. He then attended Northwestern University, being the first Afro-American man to appear in a drama production of the university. He also appeared in other drama productions in Chicago, and later went on Broadway as a cast member of Porgy and Bess.

Pharr left the musical to join the quartet Delta Rhythm Boys as a baritone. They appeared mostly in Europe, Japan and Hawaii. They were among the first Afro-American groups to appear in Miami Beach. Pharr was called "Miami's pride and joy" and was "openly homosexual".

While in Sweden in tour, Pharr became a personal friend of Ingemar Johansson. On January 21, 1941, Pharr, a gay man, married Mabel Mercer to give her a valid passport to leave Europe and enter the United States. The marriage was arranged by Mercer's then lover, Joe Carstairs.

While in Madrid, Spain, in 1960 Pharr discovered he had cancer and underwent a major operation in Paris. He spent the Christmas season in Miami with his father and left for Japan for work soon after. He returned to Honolulu, where he again fell ill and entered the hospital. He died on April 20, 1961, in Honolulu, Hawaii.
