= List of doo-wop musicians =

This is a list of doo-wop musicians.

== A ==
- The Accents
- The Ad Libs
- The Alley Cats
- Lee Andrews & the Hearts
- The Angels
- The Aquatones
- The Ardells
- The Avons

== B ==
- Hank Ballard
- The Belmonts
- The Blue Jays
- The Bop Chords
- The Bobbettes
- The Bosstones
- The Buccaneers

== C ==
- The Cadets
- The Cadillacs
- The Capitols
- The Capris
- The Cap-Tans
- The Cardinals
- The Casinos
- The Cavaliers
- Jimmy Castor
- Gene Chandler
- The Channels
- The Chantels
- The Charms
- The Charts
- The Checkers
- The Chevrons
- The Chiffons
- The Chimes
- The Chips
- The Chordettes
- The Chords (US band)
- The Classics
- The Cleftones
- The Clovers
- The Collegians
- The Contours
- The Corsairs
- The Counts
- Don Covay and the Goodtimers
- The Crests
- The Crew Cuts
- The Crows
- The Crystals
- The Cues
- The Cufflinks

== D ==
- The Danleers
- Danny & the Juniors
- The Darts
- The Del Satins
- The Del-Vikings
- The Dells
- The Delta Rhythm Boys
- The Demensions
- The Devotions
- The Diamonds
- Dante & the Evergreens
- Dion
- Dion and the Belmonts
- Don and Juan
- The Dreamlovers
- The Drifters
- The Dubs
- The Duprees
- The Dynamics

== E ==
- The Earls
- The Earth Angels
- The Echoes
- The Edsels
- The El Dorados
- The Elegants
- The Emersons
- The Escorts
- The Esquires
- The Essentials
- The Essex
- The Extremes

== F ==
- The Falcons
- The Fiestas
- The Firebirds
- The Fireflies
- The Five Discs
- The Five Keys
- The Five Satins
- The Five Sharps
- The Flairs
- The Flamingos
- The Fleetwoods
- The Four Seasons
- Norman Fox & The Rob-Roys

== G ==
- The Gaylords
- The Gladiolas
- The G-Clefs

== H ==
- The Halos
- The Harptones
- Thurston Harris
- The Heartbeats
- The Hollywood Flames

== I ==
- The Impalas
- The Impressions
- The Ink Spots
- The Innocents
- The Isley Brothers

== J ==
- Jackie and the Starlites
- The Jarmels
- Jay and the Americans
- The Jesters
- The Jewels
- The Jive Bombers
- The Jive Five
- The Jiving Juniors
- Johnnie & Joe

== K ==
- The King Khan & BBQ Show
- The Knockouts

== L ==
- Richard Lanham
- The Larks
- Lillian Leach & the Mellows
- Little Anthony and the Imperials
- Little Caesar & the Romans
- The Little Dippers
- Frankie Lymon

== M ==
- Johnny Maestro & the Brooklyn Bridge
- The Majors
- Barry Mann
- The Marcels
- The Marvelettes
- The Marvelows
- Marvin & Johnny
- Meghan Trainor
- The Mello-Kings
- The Midnighters
- The Miracles
- The Mohawks
- The Monotones
- The Moonglows
- The Mystics

== N ==
- Nino and the Ebb Tides
- The Nutmegs

== O ==
- The Olympics
- The Orioles
- The Overtones
- The Orlons

== P ==
- The Paradons
- The Paragons
- The Parliaments
- The Penguins
- The Platters
- The Premiers
- The Prodigals

== Q ==
- The Quin-Tones
- The Quotations

== R ==
- The Radiants
- The Raindrops
- Randy & The Rainbows
- The Ravens
- The Rays
- The Reflections
- The Regents
- The Rivieras
- The Rivingtons
- Robert & Johnny
- Rockin' Chairs
- The Ronettes
- Ronnie & the Hi-Lites
- Rosie and the Originals
- Ruben and the Jets
- Ruby & the Romantics

== S ==
- The Sensations
- Rocky Sharpe and the Replays
- The Shells
- Shep and the Limelites
- The Shirelles
- The Showmen
- The Silhouettes
- The Six Teens
- The Skyliners
- The Solitaires
- Bob B. Soxx & the Blue Jeans
- The Spaniels
- The Stereos
- Nolan Strong & the Diablos
- The Students
- The Sultans
- The Swallows

== T ==
- Brenda and The Tabulations
- The Teenagers
- The Termites
- The Tokens
- The Turbans
- The Tymes

== V ==
- The Valentines
- Vampiri
- Kenny Vance and the Planotones
- The Velvets
- The Velvetones
- The Videos
- Vito & the Salutations
- The Vocaleers
- The Volumes

== W ==
- Billy Ward and His Dominoes
- The Wheels
- The Wildwoods
- Maurice Williams and the Zodiacs
- Otis Williams and the Charms
- The Willows
- The Wrens

== Y ==
- Kathy Young and the Innocents

== Z ==
- The Zippers
- The Zirkons
