= Tkay Maidza discography =

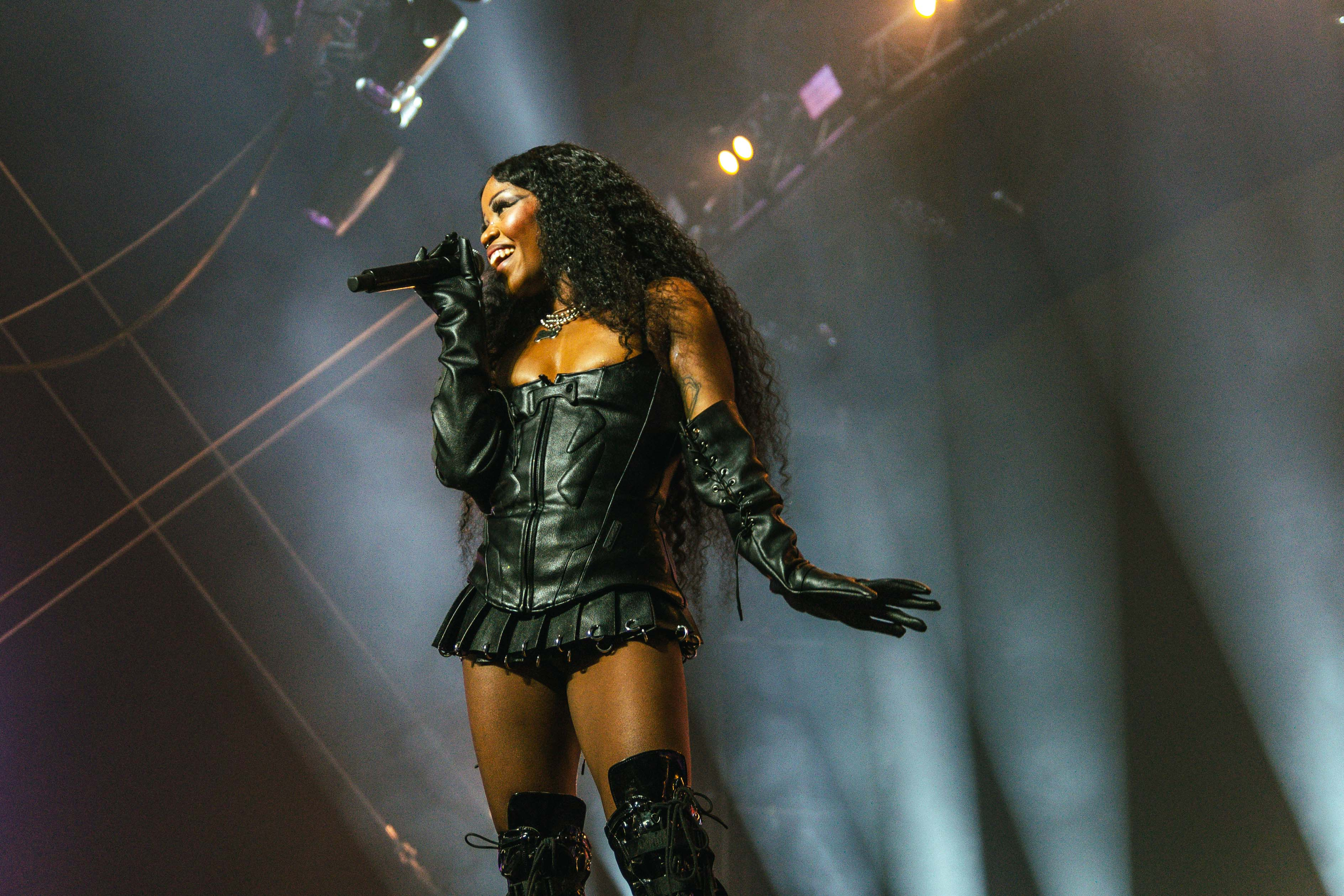
- Maidza in August 2024
- Studio albums: 2
- EPs: 4
- Singles: 39
- Album appearances: 4

The discography of Zimbabwean-born Australian recording artist Tkay Maidza consists of two studio albums, three extended plays, thirty-nine singles (including nine as featured artist) and four album appearances.

== Studio albums ==
Title	Album details	Peak chart positions		
Title	Album details	AUS	SCO	UK R&B
Tkay	Released: 28 October 2016; Label: Dew Process; Format: Digital download, CD, vinyl	20	—	—
Sweet Justice	Released: 3 November 2023; Label: 4AD, Dew Process; Format: Digital download, CD, vinyl	—	20	1

== Extended plays ==
Title	Album details	Peak chart positions
Title	Album details	AUS
Switch Tape	Released: 24 October 2014; Label: Dew Process; Format: Digital download	—
Last Year Was Weird (Vol. 1)	Released: 31 August 2018; Label: Dew Process; Format: Digital download, streaming	—
Last Year Was Weird (Vol. 2)	Released: 7 August 2020; Label: 4AD; Formats: Digital download, streaming, vinyl	—
Last Year Was Weird (Vol. 3)	Released: 9 July 2021; Label: 4AD; Formats: Digital download, streaming, vinyl	189

== Singles ==
=== As lead artist ===
List of singles as lead artist, with year released, selected peak chart positions, certifications, and album details shown
Title	Year	Peak chart positions			Certifications	Album
Title	Year	AUS	AUS Urban	NZ Hot	Certifications	Album
"Brontosaurus"	2013	89	12	—		Non-album single
"U-Huh"	2014	—	—	—	ARIA: Platinum	Switch Tape
"Switch Lanes"	2014	—	—	—		Switch Tape
"M.O.B."	2015	52	6	—	ARIA: Gold	Switch Tape
"Ghost"	2015	96	13	—		Switch Tape
"Carry On" (featuring Killer Mike)	2016	89	—	—		Tkay
"Simulation"	2016	106	—	—		Tkay
"Glorious"	2017	—	—	—		Non-album singles
"Bom Bom" (with Danny L Harle)	2017	—	—	—		Non-album singles
"Flexin'" (featuring Duckwrth)	2018	—	—	—		Last Year Was Weird Vol. 1
"White Rose"	2018	—	—	38		Last Year Was Weird Vol. 1
"Awake" (featuring JPEGMafia)	2019	—	—	—		Last Year Was Weird, Vol. 2
"IDC If U Be Ded"	2019	—	—	—		Non-album single
"Shook"	2020	—	—	—		Last Year Was Weird, Vol. 2
"Don't Call Again" (featuring Kari Faux)	2020	—	—	—		Last Year Was Weird, Vol. 2
"You Sad"	2020	—	—	—		Last Year Was Weird, Vol. 2
"24k"	2020	—	—	—	ARIA: Gold	Last Year Was Weird, Vol. 2
"Kim" (with Yung Baby Tate)	2021	—	—	—		Last Year Was Weird, Vol. 3
"Where Is My Mind?"	2021	—	—	—		Bills & Aches & Blues (40 Years of 4AD)
"Syrup"	2021	—	—	—		Last Year Was Weird, Vol. 3
"Cashmere"	2021	—	—	—		Last Year Was Weird, Vol. 3
"Real Nice (H.C.T.F.)" (with Young Franco featuring Nerve)	2021	—	—	—		Non-album singles
"Nights in December"	2022	—	—	—		Non-album singles
"Show Me the Money" (with Snakehips)	2023	—	—	—		Never Worry
"Silent Assassin" (with Flume)	2023	—	—	21		Sweet Justice
"Ring-a-Ling"	2023	—	—	—		Sweet Justice
"WUACV"	2023	—	—	—		Sweet Justice
"Out of Luck" (featuring Lolo Zouaï and Amber Mark)	2023	—	—	—		Sweet Justice
"Won One"	2023	—	—	—		Sweet Justice
"Ghost"	2023	—	—	—		Sweet Justice
"Must Be"	2026	—	—	—		TBA
"Pressed"	2026	—	—	—		TBA
"Plz Hold" (with Snakehips and Austin Millz)	2026	—	—	—		TBA
"Romanticize" (with Jenevieve)	2026	—	—	—		TBA
"—" denotes releases that did not chart or were not released in that territory.

=== As featured artist ===
List of singles as featured artist, with year released, selected chart positions, certifications, and album details shown
Title	Year	Peak chart positions						Certifications	Album
Title	Year	AUS	AUT	BEL (Fl)	FRA	GER	UK	Certifications	Album
"They Say" (Kilter featuring Tkay Maidza)	2014	—	—	—	—	—	—		Non-album single
"Imprint" (Must Die! featuring Tkay Maidza)	2015	—	—	—	—	—	—		Death & Magic
"Down Like This" (Motez featuring Tkay Maidza)	2016	—	—	—	—	—	—		The Vibe
"Do It Right" (Martin Solveig featuring Tkay Maidza)	2016	56	72	31	38	41	97	BPI: Gold; SNEP: Gold	Non-album singles
"Mistakes" (Basenji featuring Tkay Maidza)	2017	—	—	—	—	—	—		Non-album singles
"Real Truth" (J-E-T-S (Machinedrum and Jimmy Edgar) featuring Tkay Maidza)	2019	—	—	—	—	—	—		Zoospa
"Hazy" (Kyle Dion featuring Tkay Maidza)	2022	—	—	—	—	—	—		Non-album singles
"Bang My Line" (Cosmo's Midnight featuring Tkay Maidza)	2022	—	—	—	—	—	—		Non-album singles
"Be Somebody" (Emotional Oranges featuring Tkay Maidza)	2023	—	—	—	—	—	—		Non-album singles
"UberEX" (Skylar Simone featuring Tkay Maidza)	2025	—	—	—	—	—	—		Non-album singles
"R U Ok?" (Bina featuring Tkay Maidza)	2026	—	—	—	—	—	—		
"—" denotes releases that did not chart or were not released in that territory.

== Other appearances ==
List of other appearances by Tkay Maidza
Title	Year	Album	Artist
"DKLA"	2015	Blue Neighbourhood	Troye Sivan
"Lying Too"	2016	America Lamb Oil	Holychild
"Glide"	2018	Breathing Room	Hoodboi
"Lonely Days"	2022	Cry Sugar	Hudson Mohawke

== Music videos ==
List of music videos, showing year released and director
Title	Year	Director(s)
"Brontosaurus"	2013	
"U-Huh"	2014	Josh Logue
"Switch Lanes"	2014	Sachio Cook
"M.O.B."	2015	
"Imprint" (MUST DIE! featuring Tkay Maidza)	2015	Brendan Vaughan
"Carry On" (featuring Killer Mike)	2016	
"Simulation"	2016	
"Flexin'" (featuring Duckwrth)	2018	Keenan MacWilliam
"White Rose"	2018	Keenan MacWilliam
"Awake" (featuring JPEGMafia)	2019	
"Real Truth" (J-E-T-S featuring Tkay Maidza)	2019	
"Shook"	2020	Jenna Marsh
"Don't Call Again" (featuring Kari Faux)	2020	Tkay Maidza and Jordan Kirk
"You Sad"	2020	Jocelyn Anquetil
"Silent Assassin" (with Flume)	2023	
"Ring-a-Ling"	2023	
"WUACV"	2023	Bel Downie
