= Castles in the Sky =

Castles in the Sky or Castle in the Sky may refer to:

== Film and television ==
- Castles in the Sky (film), a 2014 British fact-based television drama
- Castle in the Sky, a 1986 animated film directed by Hayao Miyazaki featuring a floating city
- "Castles in the Sky", an episode in the 9th season of Arthur

== Music ==
- "Castles in the Sky" (song), a 2000 single by Ian Van Dahl
- Castle in the Sky, a 1977 album by David Castle
- "Castles in the Sky", a song by Pharaoh from Bury the Light, 2012
- "Castle in the Sky", a song by DJ Satomi
- "Castle in the Sky", a song by Tkay Maidza from Tkay, 2016
- "Castle in the Sky", a song by The Bop Chords, 1956

== See also ==
- Novoland: The Castle in the Sky, a 2016 Chinese television series
- Castle in the Clouds, a mansion and mountaintop estate in New Hampshire
- Castle in the Air (disambiguation)
- Floating city (science fiction)
