= Jo Armstead =

American soul singer and songwriter (born 1944)

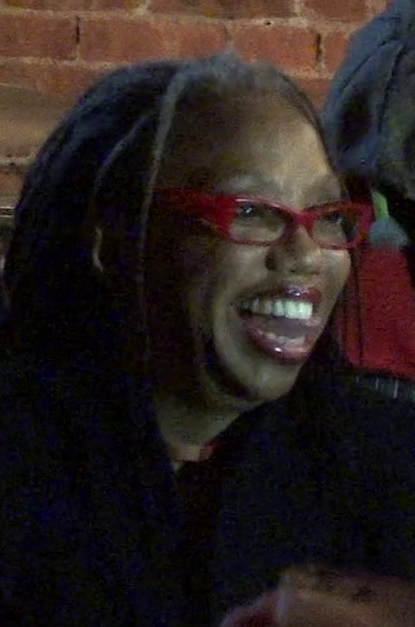
- Joshie Jo Armstead in NYC at a Melvin Van Peebles performance

Background information
- Also known as: Joshie Jo Armstead; Joshie Armstead; Jossie Armstead; Deena Johnson
- Born: Josephine Armstead; October 8, 1944 (age 81); Yazoo City, Mississippi, U.S.
- Genres: R&B, soul
- Occupations: Singer, songwriter, actress
- Instrument: Vocals
- Years active: 1961 – 1990s
- Labels: De-Lex, Infinity, Giant, Gospel Truth, Preacher Rose

Josephine Armstead (born October 8, 1944), also known as "Joshie" Jo Armstead, is an American soul singer and songwriter. Armstead began her career singing backing vocals for blues musician Bobby "Blue" Bland before becoming an Ikette in the Ike & Tina Turner Revue in the early 1960s. She also had some success as a solo singer, her biggest hit being "A Stone Good Lover" in 1968. As a songwriter, Armstead teamed up with Ashford & Simpson. The trio wrote hits for various artists, including Ray Charles, Aretha Franklin, Tina Britt, Ronnie Milsap, and Syl Johnson. In the 1970s, Armstead appeared in the Broadway musicals Don't Play Us Cheap and Seesaw.

== Life and career ==
Armstead was born to Wilton and Rosie Armstead in Yazoo City, Mississippi on October 8, 1944. She started singing in the church in which her mother was a minister. After her grandfather introduced her to blues music, she also began singing in juke joints and at dances, and first sang in a club as part of Bobby "Blue" Bland's band. She joined a local band, Little Melvin & The Downbeats, as a teenager.

In 1960, Armstead along with Eloise Hester and Delores Johnson became The Ikettes as part of the Ike & Tina Turner Revue. She had been recommended to Ike Turner by her sister Velma Dishman who was his ex-wife. As an Ikette, Armstead recorded the single "I'm Blue (The Gong-Gong Song)" which peaked at No. 19 on the Billboard Hot 100 and No. 3 on the R&B chart. In 1962, Armstead settled in New York City and recorded under the name Deena Johnson, by her own account a pseudonym to avoid being tracked down by Turner. However, she recalled her time as an Ikette fondly: "It was the greatest but you had to be young to travel the Chitlin' Circuit as they called it. We weren't flying and we didn't stay in 5-star hotels. It was really rough. You really had to be young but it was fun and we joked and laughed a lot." She added, "I have the utmost respect for Ike Turner as an artist and what he created."

After her tenure as an Ikette, Armstead recorded advertising jingles and sang back-up for such musicians as James Brown, Walter Jackson and B.B. King, before a chance meeting with Nick Ashford and Valerie Simpson. They began writing songs together, one of the first results being "Let's Go Get Stoned", which became an R&B chart no. 1 hit for Ray Charles in 1966. Its follow-up "I Don't Need No Doctor" was also a hit. The trio of writers also had success with songs for Chuck Jackson, Maxine Brown and Tina Britt. Armstead also wrote or co-wrote hits for other artists, including "Cry Like a Baby" by Aretha Franklin, "Casonova" by Ruby Andrews, "Jealous Kind of Fella" by Garland Green, "Come On Sock It to Me" by Syl Johnson, and "Drop By My Place" by Carl Carlton.

After Ashford and Simpson joined Motown, Armstead moved to Chicago in 1967 with her husband, record producer Mel Collins, and formed Giant Productions. The Giant label released her single "I Feel An Urge Coming On" which, although not successful at the time, later became a favorite with Northern soul audiences in the UK. Two of her follow-up records, "A Stone Good Lover" and "I've Been Turned On", both made the R&B chart in 1968.

Armstead returned to New York after her marriage deteriorated and continued as a singer and writer of commercials. She was a backing vocalist on Bob Dylan's 1971 single "George Jackson", and sang backing vocals on Roberta Flack's album Quiet Fire (1971). Armstead had a role in the 1972 Broadway production of Melvin Van Peebles' musical, Don't Play Us Cheap, and its 1973 film adaptation. In the early 1970s, she signed to the Gospel Truth label, an offshoot of Stax, and recorded several singles as Joshie Jo Armstead, of which the most successful was "Stumblin' Blocks, Steppin' Stones" in 1974. She also sang as a backing singer for Stax. After Stax Records collapsed, Armstead continued to write songs through her own publishing company, and also worked as a fashion designer. She provided vocals for four titles on the 1977 Burt Bacharach LP Futures. In the 1980s, after returning to Chicago, Armstead had a spell managing a boxer, Alfonso Ratliff. She is also the lead vocal on the one-off disco project The Body Shop, singing on "Never", an adaptation of a song by Cy Coleman , Betty Comden and Adolph Green from "On The Twentieth Century" . She recorded for her own Prairie Rose Records in the 1990s.

Armstead was a 2006 STAR (Special Thanks And Recognition) honoree, awarded by the Metro New York Chapter of the Jackson State University Alumni Association.

A version of Armstead's song "I Feel An Urge Coming On," performed by Nick Waterhouse, has been used in the television soundtracks of CW shows Riverdale and Black Lightning.

== Selected discography ==
=== Singles ===
Year	Single		
Year	Single	US Pop	US R&B
1962	"Never Try To Love No More"	—	—
1963	"Sitting Here Thinking"	—	—
1968	"A Stone Good Lover"	129	28
1968	"I've Been Turned On"	—	50
1968	"I Feel An Urge Coming On"	—	—
1969	"Another Reason Why I Love You"	—	—
1970	"I'm Gonna Show You (How A Man Is Supposed To Be Treated)"	—	—
1973	"I Got The Vibes"	—	—
1974	"Stumblin' Blocks, Steppin' Stones (What Took Me So Long)"	—	91
1989	"In The Right Place "	—	—

=== Backing vocal credits ===
- 1971: Esther Phillips – From A Whisper to a Scream
- 1971: Valerie Simpson – Exposed
- 1971: Roberta Flack – "To Love Somebody"
- 1971: Quincy Jones – Smackwater Jack
- 1971: B.B. King – In London
- 1972: Valerie Simpson – Valerie Simpson
- 1972: David Bromberg – "Sharon"
- 1972: Archie Shepp – Attica Blues
- 1973: Ashford & Simpson – Gimme Something Real
- 1973: Blood, Sweat & Tears – No Sweat
- 1973: Esther Phillips – Black-Eyed Blues
- 1974: The Kiki Dee Band – "I've Got the Music in Me"
- 1974: Ashford & Simpson – I Wanna Be Selfish
- 1975: Roberta Flack – Feel Like Makin' Love
- 1975: Sky King – Secret Sauce
- 1975: Randall Bramblett – That Other Mile
- 1975: Frankie Valli – Closeup
- 1976: Ashford & Simpson – Come As You Are
- 1977: Burt Bacharach – Futures
- 1978: Taj Mahal – "Why You Do Me This Way"
- 1978: Good Rats – "You're Still Doing It"
- 1978: Sylvia Syms – She Loves To Hear The Music
- 1978: Nina Simone – Baltimore
- 1979: Ashford & Simpson – "Dance Forever"
- 1980: Jess Roden – Stonechaser
- 1981: Max Romeo – "Holding Out My Love To You"
- 1982: Stephanie Mills – Tantalizingly Hot
- 1998: Luther Vandross – "Get It Right"

=== Songwriting credits ===
- 1965: "The Real Thing" – Tina Britt
- 1965: "One Step at a Time" – Maxine Brown
- 1966: "Let's Go Get Stoned" – Ray Charles
- 1965: "Hey Ho, What You Do to Me" – The Guess Who
- 1965: "My Heart Belongs to You" – The Shirelles
- 1965: "Never Had It So Good" – Ronnie Milsap
- 1966: "The Hard Way" – The Nashville Teens
- 1966: "I'm Satisfied" – Chuck Jackson & Maxine Brown
- 1966: "Cry Like a Baby" – Aretha Franklin
- 1966: "I Don't Need No Doctor" – Ray Charles
- 1967: "Come on Sock It to Me" – Syl Johnson
- 1967: "Casanova (Your Playing Days Are Over)" – Ruby Andrews
- 1968: "A Stone Good Lover" – Jo Armstead
- 1968: "I've Been Turned On" – Jo Armstead
- 1968: "Sock It to Me (Part 1)" – The Deacons
- 1969: "Look at Mary Wonder (How I Got Over)" – Carl Carlton
- 1969: "Jealous Kind of Fella" – Garland Green
- 1969: "Don't Think That I'm a Violent Guy" – Garland Green
- 1969: "I Don't Need No Doctor" – Joe Cocker, Live at Woodstock
- 1970: "Drop by My Place" – Carl Carlton
- 1970: "I Can Feel It" – Carl Carlton
- 1971: "I Don't Need No Doctor" – Humble Pie, Performance: Rockin' the Fillmore
- 1972: "I Don't Need No Doctor" – New Riders of the Purple Sage, Powerglide
- 1972: "Silly Wasn't I" – Valerie Simpson
- 1973: "Cry Like a Baby" – Dorothy Moore
- 1974: "Stumblin' Blocks, Steppin' Stones (What Took Me So Long)" – Jo Armstead
- 1980: "Casanova" – Coffee
- 1982: "A Friend of Mine" – Gladys Knight & the Pips
- 1986: "I Don't Need No Doctor" – W.A.S.P., Inside the Electric Circus

== Stage ==
Year	Production	Role	Notes
1972	Don't Play Us Cheap!	Mrs. Washington	Original Broadway Production
1973	Seesaw	Sophie [Replacement]	Original Broadway Production
