= Recorte Records =

Music publisher

Recorte Records was a music publisher founded by Murray Jacobs in March 1958. They were a significant publisher of doo-wop material from New York. Artists included:

- Big Joe Hardin
- Bob Gerardi and The Classic Four
- Danny Winchell
- Evelyn Sharp
- The Gems
- Lenny Dean
- Nino and the Ebb Tides
- Rockin' Chairs
- Pete Ciolino

== Chart history ==
On September 4. 1961, Nino and the Ebb Tides' Jukebox Saturday Night charted on Billboard's Top 100, reaching number 57.
