= Sweet Justice (album) =

Studio album by Tkay Maidza
- Released: 3 November 2023
- Length: 43:59
- Label: 4AD; Dew Process
- Producer: Austin Millz; Billboard; Cut&Dry; Dan Farber; Fermin Suero Jr.; Flume; Kaytranada; Medasin; Stint; the Imports; Two Fresh

Tkay Maidza chronology
Last Year Was Weird (Vol. 3) (2021)	Sweet Justice (2023)

Singles from Sweet Justice
- 1. "Silent Assassin" Released: 7 July 2023; 2. "Ring-a-Ling" Released: 28 July 2023; 3. "WUACV" Released: 6 September 2023; 4. "Out of Luck" Released: 6 October 2023; 5. "Won One" Released: 3 November 2023; 6. "Ghost" Released: 16 November 2023

Sweet Justice is the second studio album by Australian singer and rapper Tkay Maidza, released on 3 November 2023 by 4AD and Dew Process.

Upon announcement on 26 July 2023, Maidza stated: "Sweet Justice was a way for me to channel my emotions from what I've experienced in the last two years. It's a diary of things and thoughts I've kept to myself. Making the record was a healing experience and I'm grateful to have worked with producers who have inspired me throughout my career."

At the 2024 ARIA Music Awards, the album won Best Soul/R&B Release while Maidza was nominated for Best Solo Artist. The album was shorted listed for Best LP/EP at the 2025 Rolling Stone Australia Awards.

== Critical reception ==
Professional ratings
Aggregate scores
Source	Rating
Metacritic	77/100
Review scores
Source	Rating
Beats Per Minute	55%
DIY	4/5 stars
The Guardian	4/5 stars
The Line of Best Fit	8/10
NME	4/5 stars
The Observer	3/5 stars
Pitchfork	7.6/10

According to the review aggregator Metacritic, Sweet Justice received "generally favorable reviews" based on a weighted average score of 77 out of 100 from 7 critic scores.

Kayleigh Watson from NME wrote that "a break-up album to everything that was holding her back and a personal homecoming, it is clear Maidza has found fun and fluidity in writing again." Watson concluded by saying, "Maidza has crafted a collection of perfectly constructed songs that encapsulate her karmic truth: that living well is the best revenge". Giselle Au-Nhien Nguyen from The Guardian felt that "Sweet Justice lands with a bang. It's an ambitious, sprawling record that again defies and hops across genres, flirting with different styles and sounds. It's more eclectic and bolder than her first full-length album, Tkay, but maintains that record's pop sensibilities on tracks such as 'Out of Luck', 'Walking on Air' and the synthy pulses of 'Ghost!'"

Noah Barker from The Line of Best Fit called it "her most assured and confident release thus far, one that is unmistakably underpinned by an ebbing sea of brittle anxiety. For as prickly sweet and lovesick as much of the tracklist is, this is pop music at the precipice of something, whether that be the end or a new beginning. Abstract philosophizing aside, Sweet Justice remains as immediately gratifying as the rest of her catalogue; its rapping is smoother, its hooks are catchier, and its instrumentals more fine-tuned and studied." Pitchfork's Dylan Green described Sweet Justice as "a cheeky, colorful album" that "expands on [Maidza's] growing musical confidence, the whiplash between funk, dance, and industrial styles more intense than ever".

The Music called the album "an epic ode to growth and evolution".

== Track listing ==
Sweet Justice track listing
No.	Title	Lyrics	Music	Producer(s)	Length
1.	"Love and Other Drugs"	Takudzwa Maidza	Maidza; Dan Farber; Vincent Goodyer	Farber; The Imports; Fermin Suero Jr.	3:01
2.	"WUACV"	Maidza; Alexis Andrea Boyd	Maidza; Farber	Farber; The Imports; Suero	2:17
3.	"Out of Luck" (featuring Lolo Zouaï and Amber Mark)	Maidza; Laureen Rebeha Zouaï; Amber Mark	Maidza; Mathieu Jomphe-Lepine	Billboard; The Imports; Suero	3:50
4.	"What Ya Know"	Maidza	Maidza; Brian Fisher; Adam Korbermeyer	Cut&Dry; The Imports; Austin Millz; Suero	3:22
5.	"Won One"	Maidza	Maidza; Tyler Acord; Ajay Bhattacharyya; Edmund Clement; Anita McCloud; Melvin Moore	Stint; The Imports; Suero	2:41
6.	"Love Again"	Maidza	Maidza; Grant Nelson	Medasin; The Imports; Suero	3:29
7.	"WASP"	Maidza	Maidza; Farber; David Nathan	Farber; The Imports; Suero	3:02
8.	"Ghost!"	Maidza; Boyd	Maidza; Louis Celestin	Kaytranada; The Imports; Suero	3:54
9.	"Ring-a-Ling"	Maidza	Maidza; Pa Salieu Gaye; Cassio Lopes; Kendrick Nicholls; Sherwin Nicholls; Michael Oatman	Two Fresh; The Imports; Suero	2:58
10.	"Free Throws"	Maidza; Boyd	Maidza; Farber	Farber; The Imports; Suero	2:17
11.	"Silent Assassin" (with Flume)	Maidza; Boyd	Maidza; Harley Streten	Flume; The Imports; Suero	2:07
12.	"Our Way"	Maidza; Boyd	Maidza; Celestin	Kaytranada; The Imports; Suero	3:57
13.	"Gone to the West" (featuring Duckwrth)	Maidza; Jared Lee	Maidza; Alvin Flythe Jr.; Jason Kellner; K. Nicholls; S. Nicholls	Two Fresh; The Imports; Suero	3:17
14.	"Walking on Air"	Maidza	Maidza; Farber	Farber; The Imports; Suero	3:47
Total length:					43:59

== Personnel ==
- Dale Becker – mastering
- Tyler Scott – mixing
- Dan Farber – programming (tracks 1, 2, 7, 10, 14)
- Mathieu Jomphe-Lepine – programming (3)
- Adam Korbsemeyer – programming (4)
- Austin Millz – programming (4)
- Fermin Suero Jr. – programming (4, 6)
- Ajay Bhattacharyya – programming (5)
- Grant Nelson – programming (6)
- Louis Celestin – programming (8, 12)
- Kendrick Nicholls – programming (9, 13)
- Flume – programming (11)
- Efajemue Etoroma Jr. – programming (14)

== Charts ==
Chart performance for Sweet Justice
Chart (2023)	Peak position
Australian Hip Hip/ R&B Albums (ARIA)	4
Scottish Albums (OCC)	20
UK Independent Albums (OCC)	11
UK R&B Albums (OCC)	1
