= Knitting Factory =

Nightclub in New York City

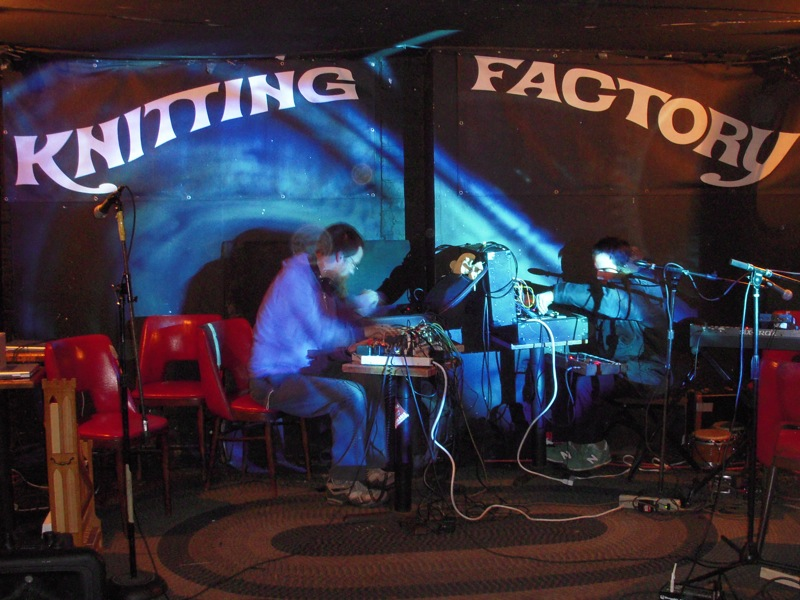
- Interactive map of Knitting Factory
- Location: New York City, U.S.
- Coordinates: 40°43′33″N 73°59′02″W
- Type: Music venue Experimental music, rock music, pop music

Construction
- Opened: 1987 by Michael Dorf and Louis Spitzer
- Expanded: 2000
- Closed: 2024

Website
- knittingfactory.com

The Knitting Factory is a nightclub in New York City that features eclectic music and entertainment and is co-owned and co-operated by Knitting Factory Entertainment. After opening in 1987, various other locations were opened in the United States.

The Knitting Factory gave its audience poetry readings, performance art, standup comedy, and musicians who transcended the usual boundaries of rock and jazz, often experimental music. The Knitting Factory owners distributed some performances to radio stations, and around 1990 starting a radio show and the record label Knitting Factory Works. Later the founders started Knitting Factory Records in 1998.

== History ==
=== Founding in New York (1987) ===
The Knitting Factory was founded by Michael Dorf and Louis Spitzer in 1987. It was named by Dorf's and Spitzer's childhood friend Bob Appel and songwriter Jonathan Zarov, who derived the name through joking about Appel's experience working in an actual knitting factory. Appel, a lifelong musician, joined as a co-owner and co-manager soon after its founding. John Zorn was heavily associated with the creative direction of the club in its earliest years.

The original location was in Manhattan at 47 East Houston Street, near to CBGB and within walking distance of The Bottom Line. The venue was founded as an art gallery, with a performance space and cafe, as well as a home for experimental music.

Within a few years, the venue relocated to a new Manhattan location at 74 Leonard St, which featured a much larger main hall that generally showcased independent rock and pop music, and two smaller subterranean stages that were initially dedicated to avant garde music.

Since 1990, the Knitting Factory has sponsored the What is Jazz? Festival, a two-week long event in several locations in New York City. The event became so successful that its name was changed to the New York Jazz Festival. Knitting Factory Records was later founded in 1998.

=== New clubs outside New York (2000–2007) ===
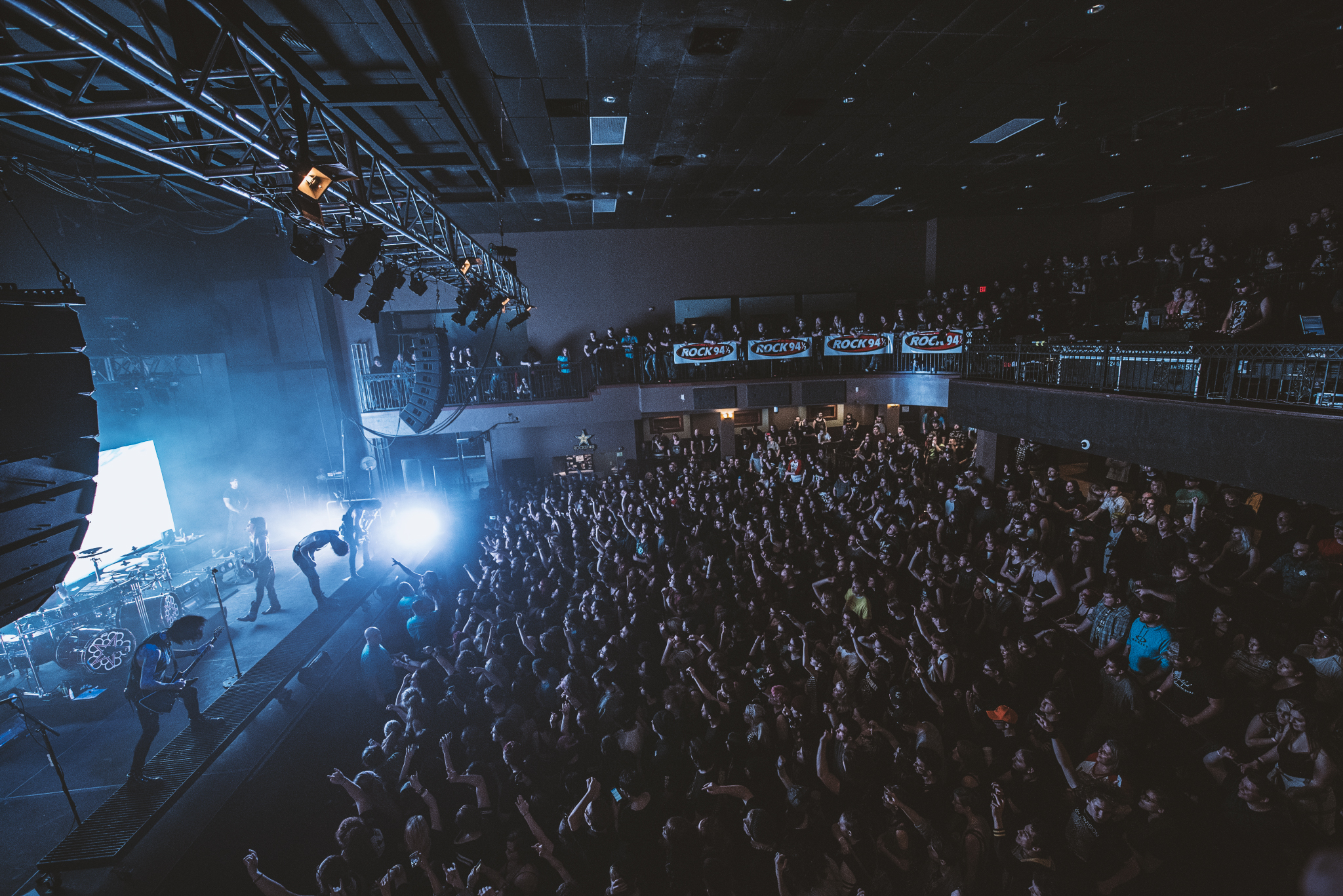
Concert at the Spokane venue

Dorf opened a new club location in Los Angeles in 2000 under the former parent company of Knitting Factory Entertainment, KnitMedia. Jared Hoffman, the founder of Instinct Records, which was acquired by Knitting Factory Entertainment in 2002, took over as CEO of the company from Dorf in 2004. In 2006 he oversaw the acquisition of concert promoters Bravo Entertainment and, in 2008, re-branded two of Bravo's clubs (one in Boise, Idaho, and another in Spokane, Washington) as Knitting Factory concert houses. The company then began promoting a number of mainstream tours throughout the US under the promotion arm Knitting Factory Presents.

In 2007 The Knitting Factory partnered with XM Satellite Radio to record and broadcast concerts from both Knitting Factory locations.

=== Ownership changes and move (2008) ===
Hoffman left the company when Morgan Margolis, who started working for the brand in 2000, took over as CEO in 2008.

In July 2008 the owners announced their move to close the Manhattan location and move to a much smaller space in Williamsburg, Brooklyn at 361 Metropolitan Ave. At this new venue alternative comedy thrived, with many notable comedians gracing the stage including Hannibal Buress, Seth Herzog, Che Bridgett, Dan Ilic, and Pete Davidson. But they changed their minds and reopened the Tribeca location, and continued putting on shows with bands including The Shells, the Cro-Mags, and New Model Army. At that time, the New York and Hollywood locations held over 5,000 live performances each year.

=== Reno and closures (2009–present) ===
In July 2009 it was reported that the Los Angeles location was closing.

The last show in the Manhattan location was on July 25, 2009, and was an event called Staff Infection in which staff took to the stage and said goodbye to their club. The last band to play KFNY was 12,000 Trees featuring 3 Knit staffers. A new location was set to reopen in Brooklyn in July 2009.

On September 9, 2009, The Knitting Factory relocated to the former space of the Luna Lounge—itself a Manhattan transplant—at 361 Metropolitan Avenue. This location, completely remodeled, had a capacity of about 300. The venue opened with a performance by Les Savy Fav.

A new Knitting Factory location opened near the Reno Arch in downtown Reno, Nevada on January 1, 2010. It was announced that this location would be closing in March 2016.

In August 2022 the Williamsburg location closed due to dramatic rent increases on top of significant revenue losses from the COVID-19 pandemic. Stated plans at the time were to relocate the venue to the East Village in 2023.

The Knitting Factory returned to Los Angeles in late 2022 with a venue opening in the neighborhood of North Hollywood. This venue closed in December 2023, with plans to reopen in the Art District of Downtown Los Angeles in 2024.

The Knitting Factory New York reopened in the old Pyramid Club location on Avenue A, which had been renamed Baker Falls, on July 20, 2023. It closed one year later in July, 2024, for sound proofing.

== Knitting Factory Works ==
Knitting Factory Works
- Founded: 1989 or 1990
- Founder: Knitting Factory
- Status: Unknown
- Country of origin: United States

The Knitting Factory gave its audience poetry readings, performance art, standup comedy, and musicians who transcended the usual boundaries of rock and jazz, such as the Lounge Lizards, John Zorn, Dewey Redman, Don Byron, Anthony Braxton, and Cecil Taylor. The owners recorded some of these performances and distributed them to radio stations. They started a radio show in 1990 that was broadcast nationwide, and sometime between 1989 and 1990 a record label called Knitting Factory Works. In ten years the label issued over 200 albums that included music by Marilyn Crispell, Mark Dresser, Bill Ware, Roy Nathanson, Charles Gayle, Joe Morris, and Curtis Fowlkes.

== See also ==
- Downtown music
- Knitting Factory Records
- List of record labels
- Noise Action Coalition
