= M.O.B. (Tkay Maidza song) =

2015 single by Tkay Maidza

Single by Tkay Maidza

from the album Switch Tape
- Released: 23 February 2015
- Length: 3:14
- Label: Tkay Maidza; Dew Process
- Songwriter: Takudzwa Maidza
- Producer: Luke McKay

Tkay Maidza singles chronology
"Switch Lanes" (2014)	"M.O.B." (2015)	"Ghost" (2015)

"M.O.B." ("Money Over Bitches") is a song by Australian singer-songwriter Tkay Maidza released in February 2015 and included on the Switch Tape mixtape and the international version of Switch Tape EP. The song was certified gold in Australia in 2017.

Maidza said "It's about the present me talking to the future me about what I want to be and hoping I achieve it. The 'money over bitches' sample is open to interpretation, but to me it actually means working hard over the 'bitches' in life, whether that's your mental struggles, people, or whatever else."

== Reception ==
Beat Magazine said "Tkay opens 'M.O.B.' with a solid pop croon, leading up to some quick fire bars over some grinding beats that almost, but not quite, lean towards dubstep, contrasting with the sugary pop glee presented elsewhere. It's intriguing in its construct, chorus-less in a way, still laden with hooks. Daring and versatile, Tkay shows no sign of tapping the brakes. Look out world."

Leigh Hill from OutInPerth said "The bouncy rap banger is just the latest from the unstoppable nineteen year old from Adelaide."

== Certifications ==
Region	Certification	Certified units/sales
Australia (ARIA)	Gold	35,000^{‡}
^{‡} Sales+streaming figures based on certification alone.
