= Whisky a Go Go, 1968 =

Live album by Frank Zappa and the Mothers of Invention
- Released: June 21, 2024
- Recorded: July 23, 1968
- Venue: Whisky a Go Go, West Hollywood, California
- Length: 176:02
- Label: Zappa Records
- Producer: Frank Zappa (original recordings); Ahmet Zappa & Joe Travers (for release)

Frank Zappa and the Mothers of Invention chronology
Funky Nothingness (2023)	Whisky a Go Go, 1968 (2024)	Cheaper Than Cheep (2025)

Whisky a Go Go, 1968 is a live album by Frank Zappa and The Mothers of Invention, posthumously released on June 21, 2024. The album features a live recording by the band recorded on July 23, 1968 at the Sunset Strip, never being properly released in full until Whisky a Go Go, 1968.

The gig was originally promoted through a handwritten ad in the L.A. Free Press, "assuring 5 full hours of unprecedented merriment, which will be secretly recorded for an upcoming record album. Dress optional. Starting sometime in the evening. R.S.V.D.T.” It is presumed that the gig was intended for an album that was not released.

The album was released as a triple CD, five LP, and a two LP highlights set. The liner notes were written by Joe Travers, Ahmet Zappa, who also produced the album, and Pamela Des Barres. The liner notes also feature an interview of Alice Cooper with Ahmet Zappa, who also performed the night the album was recorded.

== Track listing ==
All tracks composed and conducted by Frank Zappa, except where noted.

Disc one
No.	Title	Writer(s)	Length
1.	"Whisky Improvisation: Episode I"		10:00
2.	"America Drinks & Goes Home"		2:55
3.	"Help, I'm a Rock / Transylvania Boogie"		8:23
4.	"My Boyfriend's Back"	Feldman/Goldstein/Gottehrer	1:14
5.	"Bust His Head"		1:23
6.	"Tiny Sick Tears Jam"		8:19
7.	""The Purpose of This Evening...""		1:41
8.	"Whisky Improvisation: Episode II"		11:37
9.	"Status Back Baby"		5:05
10.	"Memories of El Monte"	Zappa/Collins	4:13
11.	"Oh, in the Sky"		1:57
12.	"Valerie"	Starlites	4:04

Disc two
No.	Title	Writer(s)	Length
1.	""Fun & Merriment""		1:47
2.	"Hungry Freaks, Daddy"		3:49
3.	"King Kong – Part 1"		7:57
4.	"King Kong – Part 2"	Contains interpolations of "Getting to Know You" written by Oscar Hammerstein II and Richard Rodgers and "This Is It" written by Mack David and Jerry Livingston.	7:48
5.	"Octandre"	Edgard Varèse	1:01
6.	"Whisky Improvisation: Episode III"		4:49
7.	"Meow"		2:29
8.	"God Bless America"	Irving Berlin	0:35
9.	"Presentation of Wings"		1:32
10.	"Plastic People"		3:41
11.	"Della's Preamble"		1:06
12.	"The Duke – Take 1"		6:28
13.	"The Duke – Take 2"		5:28
14.	"Khaki Sack"		10:15

Disc three
No.	Title	Writer(s)	Length
1.	"The Whip"		10:22
2.	"Whisky Chouflée"	Contains a lyrical interpolation of "Annie Had a Baby" written by Henry Glover and Lois Mann	11:46
3.	"Brown Shoes Don't Make It"		7:48
4.	"Brown Shoes Shuffle"		11:27

Bonus Vintage Mixes
No.	Title	Length
5.	"The Whip" (FZ Mix)	11:09
6.	"Hungry Freaks, Daddy" (FZ Mono Mix)	3:54

== Personnel ==
The Mothers of Invention

- Frank Zappa – vocals, guitar
- Ray Collins – vocals, percussion
- Ian Underwood – alto sax
- Bunk Gardner – tenor sax, flute
- Don Preston – keyboards, gong
- Jim Sherwood – baritone sax, percussion
- Roy Estrada – bass, vocals
- Art Tripp – drum set, percussion
- Jimmy Carl Black – drum set, percussion

Special guests

- Kim Fowley – vocals (3–6)
- GTO's – vocals (16)

Production

- Original recordings produced by Frank Zappa
- Produced for release by Ahmet Zappa & Joe Travers
- Recording engineer: Dick Kunc
- Facility: Wally Heider Remote Truck
- Source: 1" 8-track analog tape
- 96K24B digital transfers: Joe Travers
- Re-mix & audio restoration: Craig Parker Adams, Winslow CT Studios 2023
- Mastering & audio restoration: John Polito, Audio Mechanics 2023
- Cover, booklet cover, and band photography, plus live photography: George Rodriguez
- Original 1968 LA Free Press ad: Cal Schenkel
- Art direction & design: Michael Mesker
- Production director: Melanie Starks
- Liner notes: Pamela Des Barres, Joe Travers
- Interview: Alice Cooper with Ahmet Zappa
- A&R: Jeff Fura
- Production manager: Jerry Stine
- Product manager: Ashley Slater
- UMe PR: Tim Plumley

== Charts ==
Chart performance for Whisky a Go Go, 1968
Chart (2024)	Peak position
German Albums (Offizielle Top 100)	67
