= Danny Winchell =

- Born: Daniel Weinshal; September 26, 1926; Brooklyn, New York
- Died: February 16, 2011 (aged 84) Nashville, Tennessee
- Occupations: musician, producer, publisher
- Labels: MGM Records, Recorte Records
- Formerly of: Nino and the Ebb Tides

Danny Winchell (born Daniel Weinshal, September 26, 1926 – February 16, 2011) was an American pop singer, magazine publisher, record producer, music promoter and radio show host.

== Musician ==
As a musician, he released doo-wop recordings on MGM Records and Recorte Records between 1952 and 1959 including a hit with "Carolina in the Morning" in 1952. Winchell released recordings both solo and as a member of Nino and the Ebb Tides.

== Promoter and producer ==
He was a promotion man at Colpix Records where he became the co-producer of “Blue Moon” by The Marcels, which was #1 on the Billboard Pop chart for three weeks and number one on the R&B chart. Winchell was directly responsible for Murray the K debuting a pre-release copy of the song on his show on WINS. The K was so impressed with the song, he played it twenty-six times in his four-hour show the first day, making it a hit before it was released. Winchell was summoned to Colpix boss Paul Wexler's office the next day and reprimanded.

== Radio host ==
In his later years, he hosted a weekly radio show on WAMB in Nashville, Tennessee and wrote a nationally syndicated newspaper column called The Winch Line.

== Personal ==
He died in Nashville in 2011. He was remembered in a tribute to significant musical professionals by The Recording Academy related to the 54th Annual Grammy Awards.
