= I Can Feel It =

I Can Feel It may refer to:

- "I Can Feel It" (Kane Brown song), 2023
- "I Can Feel It" (Chase song), 1972
- "I Can Feel It" (Carl Carlton song), 1970
- "I Can Feel It" (The Foundations song), 1969
