= Tina Britt =

American singer

- Born: Marion L. Brittingham; July 5, 1938 (age 88); Smyrna, Delaware, U.S.
- Genres: R&B, soul
- Occupations: Singer, songwriter
- Years active: 1959–1970, 2012
- Labels: Eastern, Veep, Minit

Tina Britt (born Marion Brittingham; July 5, 1938) is an American R&B singer who had two hits on the Billboard R&B chart in the 1960s. She released one album Blue All The Way, and six 45s between 1965 and 1970.

== Life and career ==
Tina Britt was born in Smyrna, Delaware, and raised in Florida and Philadelphia. She had a peripatetic life travelling with her father, and started singing as a teenager at the First Missionary Baptist Church in Sanford, Florida. While working in New York in 1965 she was introduced to Henry 'Juggy' Murray who offered her the chance to record secular rhythm and blues for the Eastern record label, a subsidiary of the Sue label. Her first single, a version of "The Real Thing" written by Nickolas Ashford, Valerie Simpson, and Jo Armstead, but originally credited to their publisher Ed Silvers, reached No. 20 on the R&B chart.

The session that produced "The Real Thing" also gave up the follow-up single "You're Absolutely Right", another Ashford-Simpson-Armstead song and "Look", a side penned by Sidney Barnes and J.J.Jackson. Competition came from a version by the Apollas on the Loma label and sales were split, resulting in a chart miss for both. It would be three years before her next releases for the Veep label, a subsidiary of United Artists Records, in 1968. They released two singles, "Who Was That", which reached No. 39 on the R&B chart, and a revival of Don Covay's "Sookie, Sookie." Both records were produced by Juggy Murray.

Veep Records ceased in 1969 resulting in Britt being transferred to Minit Records, a subsidiary of the newly acquired Liberty Records. They released her only album, the Murray produced Blue All The Way. However, her only single for Minit, a cover of Otis Redding's Hawg For You, failed to chart. Aside from occasional session work as a background vocalist, notably for Wilbert Harrison's album Let's Work Together, her recording career had ended by 1970, and Britt left the recording industry soon afterwards. Her later life centred around raising her children. In autumn 2009, when interviewed by In The Basement magazine, she was living in Philadelphia. In 2012, she released a new download single, "Play It Back."

Her singles were compiled, with other previously unreleased tracks, on the 2006 CD Blue All the Way ...plus.
