= She's a Bad Mama Jama (She's Built, She's Stacked) =

- Side A of the US single

Single by Carl Carlton

from the album Carl Carlton
- B-side: "This Feeling's Rated X-tra"
- Released: August 1981
- Genre: Post-disco
- Length: 5:52 (album version); 3:56 (single version)
- Label: 20th Century
- Songwriter: Leon Haywood
- Producer: Leon Haywood

Carl Carlton singles chronology
"This Feeling's Rated X-Tra" (1980)	"She's a Bad Mama Jama (She's Built, She's Stacked)" (1981)	"I Think It's Gonna Be Alright" (1982)

"She's a Bad Mama Jama (She's Built, She's Stacked)" is a single by Carl Carlton. The song was written by Leon Haywood and became a major R&B hit, earning Carlton a Grammy Award nomination for Best R&B Vocal Performance, Male in 1982. Carlton's subsequent album, Carl Carlton, went gold in 1981. "She's a Bad Mama Jama" has since become a staple of compilation albums and soundtracks.

The track peaked at number 22 in the U.S. It spent 21 weeks on the American charts, six weeks longer than his bigger hit, "Everlasting Love." "She's a Bad Mama Jama" also spent eight weeks at number 2 on the R&B/Soul chart. And on popular Top 40 radio station WABC in New York City, it hit number 3 at the end of September 1981. "She's a Bad Mama Jama" was certified a Gold record. Outside the US, it reached number 34 on the UK Singles Chart.

== Chart performance ==
=== Weekly charts ===
Chart (1981–82)	Peak position
New Zealand	27
UK	34
US Billboard Hot 100	22
US Billboard Soul Singles	2
US Cash Box Top 100	23

== Certifications ==
Region	Certification	Certified units/sales
United States (RIAA)	Gold	1,000,000^{^}
^{^} Shipments figures based on certification alone.

== Sampling ==
- The song has been often sampled in rap music, including Foxy Brown and Dru Hill's "Big Bad Mama".
- On May 27, 1999, Chinese American singer Coco Lee sampled "She's a Bad Mama Jama" into her track in Mandarin, produced by Korean-American Asian music producer Jae Chong, called "We Can Dance" featured on her album, From Today Until Forever (今天到永遠).
- On October 20, 2023, American rapper Flo Milli sampled "She's a Bad Mama Jama" into her track "BGC".
