= Pete Ciolino =

Pete Ciolino was a rockabilly musician signed to Recorte Records. His biggest hit was the single Daddy Joe which was released on 10 February 1958.

He was born in Brooklyn, New York in 1936 and went on to tour with his band, The Rockabilly Kickers.
