= I Can Feel It (Carl Carlton song) =

Song by Carl Carlton
- A-side: "You've Got So Much (To Learn About Love)"
- Released: December 1970
- Length: 2:25
- Label: Back Beat
- Songwriter: Jo Armstead
- Producer: Jo Armstead

"I Can Feel It" is a song by American soul singer Carl Carlton, released in December 1970 as the b-side of "You've Got So Much (To Learn About Love)". The song reached number 47 on the Billboard Best Selling Soul Singles chart in early 1971.

== Background ==
"I Can Feel It" is a song about a man who wakes up in the morning and senses that his lady is leaving him. Feeling it in his bones, he pleads with her not to leave him. The release of the record also marked the change of the name Little Carl Carlton to Carl Carlton.

"I can Feel It" was written and produced by Jo Armstead. The song is actually the B side of the single. The A side, "You've Got So Much (To Learn About Love)", was written by D. Malone, aka Don Robey.

A Cash Box Pick of the Week, the single was reviewed in the December 19, 1970 issue of Cash Box. The flip side was given as "You've Got So Much (To Learn About Love)". Its Top 40 potential was noted. In the Location Programming Guide for juke boxes, "You've Got So Much (To Learn About Love)" along with "Get Up, Get in to It, Get Involved" by James Brown was listed in the R&B section for that week.

In the Record World Rhythm & Blues feature of the magazine's January 2 issue, "You've Got So Much" (To Learn About Love)", was listed in the Giant Sales to Start the New Year section. It was also getting airplay at KNOK in Dallas on that week. The record was now a smash for Don Robey and it was picked up by KATZ in St. Louis.

== Charts ==
"I Can Feel It" made its debut at number 50 on the Billboard Best Selling Soul Singles chart for the week ending 16 January 1971. On week three, 30 January, the song peaked at number 47.

== Later years ==
The song is included on the Kent Records 1983 compilation, Soul Class of 66. It is also on Carl Carlton's Everlasting: The Best of Carl Carlton compilation album, released in 2009. It also appears on the 70s Summer Hits compilation that was released in 2022.
