= Castles in the Air =

Castles in the air are daydreams or fantasies.

Castles in the Air may refer to:

- Castles in the Air (1911 film), a Rex Motion Picture Company film
- Castles in the Air (1919 film), an American film
- Castles in the Air (1923 film), a British film
- Castles in the Air (1939 film), an Italian film
- "Castles in the Air" (song), a 1970 song
- Castles in the Air (musical), a 1926 musical comedy

== See also ==
- Castle in the Air (disambiguation)
