= Noise Action Coalition =

The Noise Action Coalition is a group of musicians in the New York City area that works for getting fair treatment and pay for musicians.

In 1997, they participated in a boycott of Arlene's Grocery. They handed out fliers which encouraged patrons, who did not have to pay a cover, not to order drinks and go on a "water strike".

In 1998, the Noise Action Coalition successfully negotiated improved employment terms for musicians participating in the Knitting Factory/Texaco Jazz Festival. The minimum scale for ensembles of more than six musicians was upped to $75 per player, while the minimum scale for ensembles of less than six musicians was upped to $100 per player. The Knitting Factory also agreed to a wage scale of $200 for the 1999 festival.
