= Rockin' Chairs =

American doo-wop group

The Rockin' Chairs
- Origin: Queens Village, New York
- Genres: doo-wop
- Years active: 1958–1959
- Labels: Recorte Records, CBS Records, Time Records
- Past members: Lenny Dean (leader); Bob Gerardi; Carmine Ray; Rick Baxter; Joey Cary

The Rockin' Chairs were a doo-wop recording group based in Queens Village, New York active in 1958 and 1959.

== Discography ==
Title	Year	Catalog	Comments
A Kiss Is a Kiss / Rockin' Chair Boogie	1958	Recorte 402	200,000 copies sold
Please Mary Lou / Come On Baby	1958	Recorte 404	
Memories of Love / Girl of Mine	1959	Recorte 412	with backup from Nino and the Ebb Tides

== Reception ==
Billboard described their A Kiss Is a Kiss as a "hot record."

When the band played Please Mary Lou on Alan Freed's Big Beat television show, Freed commented that it sounded like Paul Anka's "Diana."

Billboard described their Memories of Love recording as having an "overly long intro" and described the recording as "none too good."

All three of their a-side recordings are considered among the top 1000 doo-wop songs of all time.
