= Last Year Was Weird (Vol. 3) =

EP by Tkay Maidza
- Released: 9 July 2021
- Label: 4AD
- Producers: The 23rd; Jennah Bell; Dan Farber; Jonathan Hoskins; Two Fresh

Tkay Maidza chronology
Last Year Was Weird (Vol. 2) (2020)	Last Year Was Weird (Vol. 3) (2021)	Sweet Justice (2023)

Singles from Last Year Was Weird (Vol. 3)
- 1. "Kim" Released: 4 February 2021; 2. "Syrup" Released: 8 April 2021; 3. "Cashmere" Released: 8 June 2021

Last Year Was Weird (Vol. 3) is the fourth extended play as well as the third and final in a trilogy by Australian singer and rapper Tkay Maidza. It was released on 9 July 2021 by 4AD.

At the ARIA Music Awards of 2021, the EP won Best Soul/R&B Release.

== Reception ==
Cyclone Wehner from Music Feeds said "Last Year Was Weird (Vol. 3) is about Maidza blossoming as a young black woman as much as affirming her auteur status" and called the volume her most "adventurous and avant-garde volume yet".

MTV said “Last Year Was Weird, Vol. 3 is nowhere near as aggressive or as explosive as its predecessors, and you notice it immediately.” Saying “Kim” is “Tkay Maidza at her most unhinged, her most unrelenting and, ultimately, her best.”

== Track listing ==
No.	Title	Writer(s)	Producer(s)	Length
1.	"Eden"	Takudzwa Maidza; Dan Farber	Dan Farber	2:53
2.	"Onto Me" (with Umi)	Maidza; Farber; Jennah Bell; Kendrick Nicholls; Sherwyn Nicholls; Tierra Wilson	Farber; Jennah Bell; Two Fresh	2:47
3.	"So Cold"	Maidza; Farber; George Flint; Henry Flint; Jonathan Hoskins	Farber; The 23rd; Jonathan Hoskins	2:51
4.	"Syrup"	Maidza; Farber	Farber	2:25
5.	"Kim" (with Yung Baby Tate)	Maidza; Farber; Tate Sequoya Farris	Farber	2:38
6.	"High Beams"	Maidza; Farber; Mary Lou Williams; Anthony Woods	Farber	2:37
7.	"Cashmere"	Maidza; Farber	Farber	3:03
8.	"Breathe"	Maidza; Farber	Farber	2:50

== Personnel ==
- Tkay Maidza – vocals
- Dan Farber – programming, mixing, engineering
- Jennah Bell – programming (track 2)
- Kendrick Nicholls – programming (track 2)
- George Flint – programming (track 3)
- Henry Flint – programming (track 3)
- Jonathan Hoskins – programming (track 3)

== Charts ==
Chart performance for Last Year Was Weird (Vol. 3)
Chart (2021)	Peak position
Australian Albums (ARIA)	189
