= Eastern Records =

Record label subsidiary

- Founded: 1964
- Founder: Juggy Murray
- Defunct: 1966
- Status: Defunct
- Distributor: Sue Records
- Location: New York, New York, U.S.

Eastern Records was a subsidiary label of Sue Records, founded by Juggy Murray. In 1965, the label released the singles "The Real Thing" by Tina Britt which reached #20 on the Billboard R&B chart, and "Time Waits For No One" by Eddie & Ernie which reached #34 on the R&B chart in 1965.

== Partial discography ==
Catalog No.	Release date	US	US R&B	Single (A-side, B-side)	Artist	Notes
600	1964			A: "Baby I'm Leaving You" B: "When You Get Tired Of Me"	Geraldine Jones	
60-002	Jun 1964			A: "Don't Hold Back" B: "The Swingin' Organ"	Duke Daniels	Cash Box review (Jun 13, 1964)
602	Dec 1964		34	A: "That's The Way It Is" B: "Time Waits For No One"	Eddie & Ernie	B-side charted
604	Apr 1965		20	A: "The Real Thing" B: "Teardrops Fell (Every Step Of The Way)"	Tina Britt	Billboard review (May 1, 1964)
609	Feb 1966			A: "I Can't Do It (I Just Can't Leave You)" B: "Lost Friends"	Eddie & Ernie	Cash Box review (Feb 12, 1966)
610	Jun 1966			A: "If You've Ever Loved Somebody" B: "Hello Baby, Goodbye Too"	Jean Wells	
611	1966			A: "She's Called A Woman" B: "Since You've Been Gone So Long"	Magnificent 7	
