= Eddie & Ernie =

American soul duo

- Also known as: Ernie & Eddie; The New Bloods; The Sliding Doors; Ernie & Ed
- Origin: Phoenix, Arizona, U.S.
- Genres: R&B, soul music
- Occupation: Vocalists
- Years active: 1961-1972
- Labels: Asnes, Ramco, Nightingale, Chess, Checker, Eastern, Columbia, Artco, Revue, Buddah
- Past members: Ernie "Sweetwater" Johnson; Eddie Campbell

Eddie & Ernie were an American soul duo in the 1960s, comprising Eddie Campbell (December 23, 1940 – July 10, 1994) and Ernie "Sweetwater" Johnson (October 22, 1943 – August 20, 2005). Based in Phoenix, Arizona, the duo sang in gospel groups before working as backing vocalists from the early 1960s. They had a minor R&B hit with "Time Waits For No One" in 1965. They also issued singles under the names Ernie & Eddie, The New Bloods, The Sliding Doors, and Ernie & Ed. Some of their songs were recorded by Dee Clark, Jackie Wilson, and James Carr.

== Life and career ==
Eddie Campbell was born William Edgar Campbell on December 23, 1940, in Lodi, Texas, and raised in Phoenix, Arizona. Campbell was singing with the local gospel group the Heavenly Travelers when his brother Lloyd introduced him to Ernie L. Johnson Jr.

Earnest L. Johnson Jr. was born October 22, 1943, in Lubbock, Texas. After the family relocated to Arizona, Johnson's father, Ernest Johnson Sr., begin singing with a local gospel group called the Crusaders. As a teenager Johnson joined his father in the group. Johnson released his debut single, "You Need Love," on Asnes Records in 1961.

Campbell and Johnson backed local singer Little Worley on his single "Who Stole My Girl" in 1961. They made their first recordings as a duo (initially as Ernie & Eddie) in 1963 with "It's A Weak Man That Cries," released on Checker Records and Nightingale Record. Musically, Eddie & Ernie are often compared to American soul duo Sam & Dave, but unlike Sam & Dave, they wrote all their own music. Although they recorded for several labels, some quite large such as Columbia, Chess, and Buddah, they never had any significant chart success. Their biggest R&B hit, "Time Waits For No One," on Eastern Records reached #34 on the R&B chart in 1965. In 1971, they both joined a local group, Phoenix Express. Their recordings later became popular with aficionados such as Dave Godin, on whose Deep Soul compilations several of their tracks appear.

Campbell died on July 10, 1994, in Los Angeles, at age 53.

Johnson was killed in a hit-and-run accident on August 20, 2005, in Phoenix, at age 61. On November 9, 2019, Johnson received a headstone in his honor at Resthaven/Carr-Tenney Memorial Gardens in Phoenix. John Dixon, who facilitated the ceremony and handled the purchasing of the headstone had interviewed Johnson. Dixon, who describes himself as "Arizona's unofficial music historian," met Johnson after being contacted by British record producers and music enthusiasts about Eddie & Ernie. He discovered that Johnson was homeless in Phoenix, tracked him down and brought him to a Denny's for breakfast where he conducted the interview. Dixon wanted to help him, so with the permission of Johnson's family he took over power of attorney for some of his songwriting royalties. Dixon also worked with soul music enthusiast Dave Godin to release an Eddie & Ernie compilation CD titled Lost Friends on Ace Records' sub label Kent Soul in 2002.

== Discography ==
=== Compilations ===
- 2002: Lost Friends (Kent Soul)

=== Singles ===
- 1961: "You Need Love"/"Tell Her For Me" (as Ernie Johnson) (Asnes 104)
- 1962: "Who Stole My Girl"/"You Better Watch Your Step" (as Little Worley & The Drops) (Ramco 3710)
- 1963: "Who's Been Knocking On My Door"/"It's A Weak Man That Cries" (Nightingale 5102 & Checker 1057)
- 1963: "Found a Love, Where It's At"/"Self Service" (as The New Bloods) (Madley 101 & 20th Century Fox 554)
- 1963: "Time Waits For No One"/"That's The Way It Is" (Tomorrow 5105 & Eastern 602 & in 1964, Checker 1086)
- 1964: "I'm A Young Man"/"Turn Here" (Eastern 603)
- 1965: "I'm Goin' For Myself"/"The Cat" (Eastern 606)
- 1965: "Outcast"/"I'm Gonna Always Love You" (Eastern 608)
- 1965: "I Believe She Will"/"We Try Harder" (Shazam 1004 & Chess 1984)
- 1966: "I Can't Do It (I Just Can't Leave You)"/"Lost Friends" (Eastern 609)
- 1966: "A Beautiful World"/"Indication" (Loadstone ????)
- 1967: "Doggone It"/"Falling Tears" (Indian Drums) (Columbia 4-44276)
- 1967: "The Groove She Put Me In"/"Indication" (Columbia unissued)
- 1967: "Why Do You Treat Me Like You Do"/"Contagious Love" (as Eddie Campbell) (Artco 103)
- 1967: "I Can't Stop The Pain"/"In These Very Tender Moments" (as Ernie Johnson) (Artco 104)
- 1970: "Woman, What Do You Be Doing"/"Thanks For Yesterday" (Revue 11049)
- 1971: "Thanks For Yesterday" / "Tell It Like It Is" (Revue 11063)
- 1971: "You Give Me Love To Go On" / "Tell It Like It Is" (Revue 11063)
- 1971: "Hiding In Shadows"/"Standing At The Crossroads" (Buddah BDA-250)
- 1972: "Beautiful World" / "Indication" (as Ernie & Ed) (Jay Boy 58)
