= Last Year Was Weird (Vol. 2) =

EP by Tkay Maidza
- Released: 7 August 2020
- Label: 4AD

Tkay Maidza chronology
Last Year Was Weird (Vol. 1) (2019)	Last Year Was Weird (Vol. 2) (2020)	Last Year Was Weird (Vol. 3) (2021)

Singles from Last Year Was Weird (Vol. 2)
- 1. "Awake" Released: 16 August 2019; 2. "Shook" Released: 12 May 2020; 3. "Don't Call Again" Released: 15 July 2020; 4. "You Sad" Released: 7 August 2020; 5. "24K" Released: October 2020

Last Year Was Weird (Vol. 2) is the third extended play and second in a trilogy by Australian singer and rapper Tkay Maidza. It was announced on 15 July 2020 alongside single "Don't Call Again" and released digitally on 7 August 2020 by 4AD. The EP features contributions from JPEGMafia and Kari Faux.

At the ARIA Music Awards of 2020, the EP was nominated for Best Soul/R&B Release.

At the Rolling Stone Australia Awards of 2021, the EP won Best Record.

== Reception ==
Professional ratings
Review scores
Source	Rating
NME	4/5 stars
The Guardian	4/5 stars
DIY	4/5 stars

Dhruva Balram from NME said "The second instalment of the three-part mixtape series serves as her playground, showcasing Maidza's stylistic range as she effortlessly flows between saccharine pop songs, anthemic hip-hop and funky R&B." Balram continued "The eight-track EP displays her penchant for flitting between meaningless genres, dipping her toes into what she pleases. This may just be a mixtape, but it bodes well for the future, as if Maidza is cutting her loosies away from a major record, experimenting to see what sticks while garnering a wide audience. It's not perfect, yet Last Year Was Weird, Vol. 2 does enough to be reminded of Maidza's talent while anticipating her next one." Balram called ‘Shook’, "the standout track".

Kate Hutchinson from The Guardian called it "a bullseye between contemporary hip-hop and easy-breezy catchy pop" Beverly Bryan from Pitchfork said the "eight varied tracks that allow her to showcase her versatility."

Ben Tripple from DIY Mag said "Showing a greater flare for experimentation and rejecting many hip-hop and R&B staples in favour of a genre-crossing grit, Last Year Was Weird Vol. 2 channels the innovation of the likes of Missy Elliott on the unabashed 'Shook' and places it against the minimalist dance-floor ready '24k'. By the time the dancehall pop of 'You Sad' and the nostalgic groove of 'PB Jam' rear their heads, the obvious inconsistency of the mixtape instead presents itself as imaginative confidence."

== Track listing ==
No.	Title	Writer(s)	Producer(s)	Length
1.	"My Flowers"	Takudzwa Maidza; Dan Farber	Maidza; Farber	3:40
2.	"24K"	Maidza; Farber	Maidza; Farber; Roger Schami	3:53
3.	"Shook"	Maidza; Farber	Farber	2:42
4.	"Awake" (featuring JPEGMafia)	Maidza; Farber; Barrington Hendricks	Farber	3:31
5.	"Grasshopper"	Maidza; Farber	Maidza; Farber	3:02
6.	"You Sad"	Maidza; Farber; Jerome Farah	Maidza; Farber	2:37
7.	"PB Jam"	Maidza; Farber	Maidza; Farber; Erik Shiboski	3:43
8.	"Don't Call Again" (featuring Kari Faux)	Maidza; Farber; Kari Johnson	Farber; Jah Loon	3:46

== Charts ==
Chart performance for Last Year Was Weird (Vol. 2)
Chart (2021)	Peak position
UK Official Record Store Chart (OCC)	16

== Release history ==
Country	Date	Format	Label	Catalogue
Various	7 August 2020	digital download	4AD	—N/a
United States and United Kingdom	May 2021	12” EP	4AD / Dew Process	4AD0296T
