= Castle in the Air =

A castle in the air is a daydream or fantasy.

Castle in the Air may refer to:

- Castle in the Air (play), a 1949 play by Alan Melville
- Castle in the Air (film), a 1952 British comedy film based on the play
- Castle in the Air (novel), a 1990 young adult fantasy novel by Diana Wynne Jones
- The Castle in the Air, a setting in the children's book The Phantom Tollbooth
- A Castle in the Air, a 1894 poem by May Kendall.

== See also ==
- Castles in the Air (disambiguation)
- Castle in the sky (disambiguation)
