= The Bop Chords =

Harlem musical group

- Origin: Harlem, New York
- Genres: Rhythm & Blues, Rock & Roll, Doo-wop
- Years active: 1956-1957
- Label: Holiday
- Past members: William Dailey; Ken "Butch" Hamilton; Leon Ivey; Morris "Mickey" Smarr; Skip Boyd; Peggy Jones

The Bop Chords were a musical group from Harlem, New York, founded in 1955. They had a hit record titled Castle in the Sky.

== History ==
Part of the Harlem Doo-wop scene (which also included groups such as the Ladders, the Channels, and the Willows), The Bop Chords formed in 1955. When the quintet originally formed they went under the name "Five Sins". When the group formed it was led by lead vocalist Ernest Harriston (tenor) with backup vocals provided by William Dailey (tenor), Ken "Butch" Hamilton (tenor, who replaced Edward Boyd (baritone) who was a part of the Five Sins), Leon Ivey (bass), and Morris "Mickey" Smarr (baritone). This first lineup recorded the single "Castle in the Sky" for the Holiday label which became a local and regional hit in 1956, selling more than 150,000 copies and making the east coast singles chart. The B-side of the single was the song "My Darling To You", which while not as popular when released has over the years become a more popular and recognizable recording for the group. In July 1956 The Bop Chords would make a debut performing for a week at the Apollo Theater with The Cadillacs and LaVern Baker. Hamilton recalled of their performances at the Apollo:

“Our other outfit was a black shirt with a white tie, kind of flashy. I remember standing in the wings waiting to go on; my knees were shaking. We were nervous, man! I’ll never forget, Dr. Jive said, ‘Here are your five young men from New York City that have a big record around town of ‘Castle In The Sky.’ Let’s welcome the Holiday recording stars, The Bop Chords!’ I almost tripped over the mike going out, I was so nervous. I jumped up about six inches off the ground and did a split and the crowd went wild. It was great.”

Their second single "When I Woke Up This Morning" became an East Coast Doo-wop hit in 1957 and was released “Really Love Her So” on the B-side and sold over 75,000 copies. They would be invited back for a second performance at the Apollo, this time performing alongside Fats Domino and Little Richard. They continued to perform on the East coast club circuit and made a few television appearances.

After the release of their second single and second performance at the Apollo, William Dailey and Morris Smarr left the group and were replaced by Edward "Skip" Boyd (baritone), who had been a member of the Five Sins, and Peggy Jones (tenor), adding a female vocalist to the line up to increase the range. Under this lineup they recorded the single “So Why” with the song “Baby” on the B-side. This single failed to attract much attention and the group disbanded towards the end of 1957. One of their final appearances was on Nov. 1, 1957, at Hunts Point Palace in The Bronx performing alongside The Dubs, The Shells, The Bobbettes, The Chantels and Al Sears.

Harriston, Hamilton, Boyd, and Ivey would reform the group in 1971 and toured on the oldies circuit on the East Coast for a number of years, but never recorded any new material.

In 1981, after years of receiving airplay on “oldies” format radio, six of their songs would be released as an album by Lost Nite Records produced in red vinyl. The group continues to receive airplay on “Oldies” format radio stations and their songs have appeared regularly on Doo-wop and 50's Oldies compilations.

== Deaths ==
Morris Smarr died in Queens, New York from pneumonia (possibly brought on by substance abuse)

Ernest Harriston was murdered in Harlem in the mid-1970s.

Leon Ivey died in 1993, after years of being an alcoholic.

Ken Hamilton died on September 6, 2002, from cancer.

== Discography ==
=== Singles ===
- Castle In The Sky / My Darling To You - Holiday (1956)
- So Why / Baby - Holiday (1957)
- When I Woke Up This Morning / Really Love Her So - Holiday (1957)

=== LP Releases ===
- The Best Of The Bop-Chords - Lost Nite Records (1981)
