= Switch Tape =

EP by Tkay Maidza
- Released: 24 October 2014
- Labels: Tkay Maidza; Dew Process
- Producers: Bok Bok; Luke McKay; Paces

Tkay Maidza chronology
| Switch Tape (2014) | Tkay (2016) |

Singles from Switch Tape
- 1. "U-Huh" Released: 21 July 2014; 2. "Switch Lanes" Released: 16 October 2014; 3. "M.O.B." Released: February 2015; 4. "Ghost" Released: November 2015

Switch Tape is the debut extended play by Australian singer and rapper Tkay Maidza. It was released on 24 October 2014. A mixtape was self-released on Maidza's SoundCloud in October 2014 as well, mixed by Maidza's longtime producer and collaborator DJ, Elk. The mixtape featured unreleased tracks and collaborations.

The release was supported by an Australian tour commencing in Canberra on 7 November 2014.

== Reception ==
In a review of the mixtape, Chris Deville from Stereogum said "If Maidza's 'U-Huh' video wasn’t enough to affirm that she's worthy of our collective attention — it was — the new Switch Tape seals the deal. Over the course of originals, remixes, and Maidza's features on other people's tracks, it presents a wildly adventurous talent." Andrew Unterberger from Spin Magazine said "A bumper-car ride through hip-hop, pop and dance, Switch Tape was one of the most freewheeling and exciting debuts of the year."

== Track listings ==
Australian EP track listing
| No. | Title | Writer(s) | Producer(s) | Length |
|---|---|---|---|---|
| 1. | "U-Huh" | Takudzwa Maidza | Luke McKay | 3:26 |
| 2. | "Finish Them" | Maidza | Bok Bok | 3:50 |
| 3. | "Switch Lanes" | Maidza | Paces | 3:15 |
| 4. | "U-Huh" (KLP remix) | Maidza | McKay | 3:43 |
| 5. | "U-Huh" (Luke Million remix) | Maidza | McKay | 3:47 |

International EP track listing
| No. | Title | Writer(s) | Producer(s) | Length |
|---|---|---|---|---|
| 1. | "U-Huh" | Takudzwa Maidza | Luke McKay | 3:26 |
| 2. | "Switch Lanes" | Maidza | Paces | 3:15 |
| 3. | "Ghost" | Maidza | Luke McKay | 3:29 |
| 4. | "M.O.B." | Maidza | McKay | 3:14 |
| 5. | "Finish Them" | Maidza | Bok Bok | 3:50 |

Mixtape track listing
| No. | Title | Writer(s) | Producer(s) | Length |
|---|---|---|---|---|
| 1. | "Always Been" | Takudzwa Maidza | Luke McKay |
| 2. | "Switch Lanes" | Maidza | Paces | 3:15 |
| 3. | "M.O.B." | Maidza | Luke McKay | 3:!4 |
| 4. | "Finish Them" | Maidza | Bok Bok | 3:50 |
| 5. | "Everybody Knows" (by SBTRKT) (Tkay Maidza edit) |
| 6. | "Brontosaurus" (Elk Drum edit) | Maidza; Mario Spate |
| 7. | "Wishes" (by Swick and Lewis Cancut) (featuring Tkay Maidza) |
| 8. | "The Monochrome" (by Friend Within) (featuring Tkay Maidza) |
| 9. | "Forever" | | Swick |
| 10. | "Gangsta" | | Elk |
| 11. | "Give It All" (Carmada - L D R U & Yahtzel featuring Tkay Maidza) |
| 12. | "hey Say" (Kilter featuring Tkay Maidza) |
| 13. | "U-Huh" | Maidza | McKay | 3:26 |
| 14. | "U-Huh" (Luke Million remix) | Maidza | McKay | 3:47 |
| 15. | "Imprint" (Must Die! featuring Tkay Maidza) |
| 16. | "TM" | | Lewis Cancut; Swick |
| 17. | "Basskick Pump" | | Swick |
| 18. | "Trouble" | | Motez |

== Release history ==
| Country | Date | Format | Label | Catalogue | Version |
|---|---|---|---|---|---|
| Australia | 24 October 2014 | digital download | Dew Process | DEW9000725 | EP |
| worldwide | October 2014 | digital download | Tkay Maidza | —N/a | mixtape |
| Europe | December 2015 | digital download | various | —N/a | EP |
