= U-Huh (song) =

2014 single by Tkay Maidza

Single by Tkay Maidza

from the album Switch Tape
- Released: 21 July 2014
- Length: 3:26
- Label: Tkay Maidza; Dew Process
- Songwriter(s): Takudzwa Maidza
- Producer(s): Luke McKay

Tkay Maidza singles chronology
"Brontosaurus" (2013)	"U-Huh" (2014)	"Switch Lanes" (2014)

"U-Huh" is a song by Australian singer-songwriter Tkay Maidza released in July 2014 as the lead single from Maidza's debut EP Switch Tape. The song was certified platinum in Australia in 2022.

Maidza said the inspiration for the song came from the experience of people pretending to like you and the reality that friendships are sometimes not genuine.

== Reception ==
Beat Magazine said "Airhorn galore and subliminal background adulation make for a jam that’s custom-crafted for the festival stage, the overloaded instrumentation is always playful and never messy." adding "Impossible to resist getting down to this."

Glam Adelaide said "'U-huh' shows an incredibly fierce and fearless young woman, her lightning-fast flow and clever wordplay sparks with an insatiable hook that urges you to dance." Cool Hunting said "Her confidence-boosting single 'U-Huh' fuses pop, rap and electronic music for a track that's as catchy as it is fierce."

== Certifications ==
Region	Certification	Certified units/sales
Australia (ARIA)	Platinum	70,000^{‡}
^{‡} Sales+streaming figures based on certification alone.
