= Carl Carlton =

American R&B and funk singer-songwriter (1952–2025)

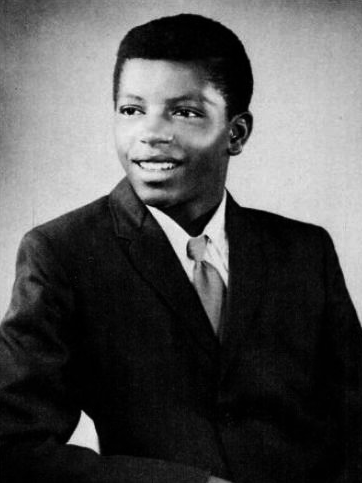
- Carlton in 1968

Background information
- Born: Carlton Hudgens; May 21, 1952; Detroit, Michigan, U.S.
- Died: December 12, 2025 (aged 73)
- Genres: Pop, R&B, soul, funk
- Occupations: Singer, songwriter
- Years active: 1965–2025

Carl Carlton (born Carlton Hudgens; May 21, 1952 (Note: Several sources give his birth year as 1953, while Today's Liz Calvario cites a Facebook post by his son "clarifying his father’s May 21, 1952 birthday".) – December 12, 2025) was an American R&B, soul, and funk singer-songwriter, best known for his hits "Everlasting Love" and "She's a Bad Mama Jama (She's Built, She's Stacked)".

== Background ==
Carlton Hudgens was born in Detroit, Michigan, on May 21, 1952. He began his career in the mid-1960s as "Little" Carl Carlton. It was a marketing ploy to capitalize on some vocal similarities to Stevie Wonder, who recorded under the name "Little Stevie Wonder" in the early 1960s. His first recordings were for Lando Records, for which he recorded some minor local hits, including "So What" and "Don't You Need a Boy Like Me".

In 1968, Don D. Robey signed Carlton to the Back Beat Record label, which Robey had started in 1957. Shortly after signing with the label, Carlton relocated to Houston, Texas, to be closer to his new label.

== Career ==
Carlton's first single with Back Beat Records, "Competition Ain't Nothing", became a huge hit on the UK northern soul scene after its release on the UK's Action Records label.

He was listed as one of the Cash Box Best R&B Artists of 1970 in the December 26 issue of the magazine.

In January 1971, Carlton had a hit on the Billboard Best Selling Soul Singles chart with "I Can Feel It". It spent three weeks in the chart, peaking at no. 47.

Carlton finally saw major success in the United States with a cover version of Robert Knight's "Everlasting Love". This song went to number 6 in 1974 on the US Billboard Hot 100, and number 11 on the Billboard R&B chart, spending 15 weeks on the Billboard Hot 100 charts.

Back Beat Records owner Robey sold his labels to ABC Records in 1972. ABC Records released the anthology album You Can't Stop a Man in Love, a compilation of Carlton's earlier hits. Beginning in 1976, Carlton became embroiled in a royalty dispute with ABC Records that caused him to stop recording for some time. He signed with Mercury Records in 1977, releasing You, You/Something's Wrong that same year. Carlton was unable to land a new recording contract for several years until Leon Haywood helped him get a singles deal with 20th Century Records.

A Haywood-penned single, "She's a Bad Mama Jama (She's Built, She's Stacked)", became a major hit in 1981, peaking at number 2 on the soul chart and earning Carlton a Grammy Award nomination for Best R&B Vocal Performance, Male at the 24th Annual Grammy Awards in 1982. The track peaked at number 34 on the UK Singles Chart. Carlton's subsequent album, Carl Carlton, went gold in 1981. "She's a Bad Mama Jama" has since become a staple of compilation albums and soundtracks and is often sampled in rap music.

Carlton continued to release albums after his eponymous 1981 album, including 1985's Private Property and 1994's Main Event but his subsequent albums were less popular and his creative output declined in the late 1980s.

In 2003, Carlton was featured with many R&B stars such as Aretha Franklin on the "Rhythm, Love, and Soul" edition of the PBS series American Soundtrack. His performance of "Everlasting Love" was included on the accompanying live album that was released in 2004.

On August 1, 2010, Carlton released his first gospel single entitled "God Is Good". On April 16, 2011, Carlton was nominated for a Detroit Music Award in the "Outstanding Gospel/Christian Vocalist" category.

== Later life and death ==
Carlton suffered from complications of a stroke in 2019. He died on December 12, 2025, at the age of 73. In addition to his son Carlton Hudgens II, he was survived by a wife and two other sons.

== Discography ==
=== Albums ===
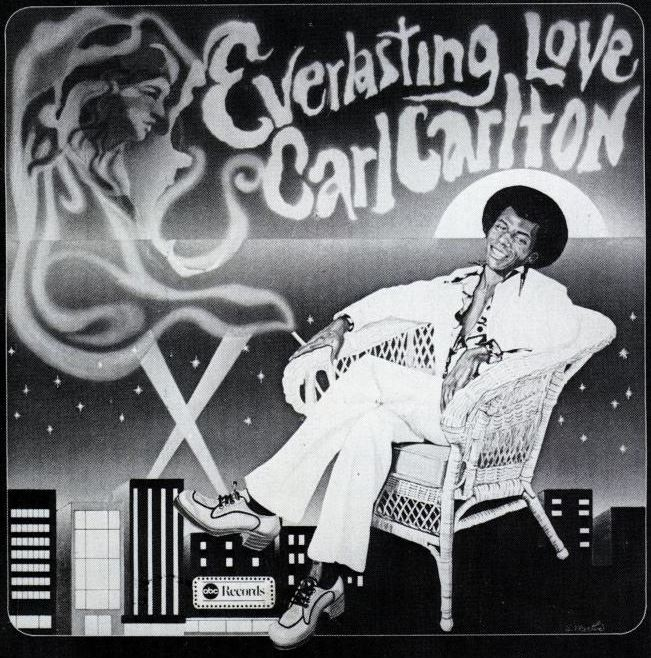
Everlasting Love (1974) from a 1975 Billboard magazine ad

Year	Album	Chart positions		Label
Year	Album	US	US R&B	Label
1973	Can't Stop a Man in Love	165	51	Back Beat
1974	Everlasting Love	132	22	ABC
1975	I Wanna Be with You	—	49	ABC
1981	Carl Carlton	34	3	20th Century Fox
1982	The Bad C.C.	133	21	RCA Victor
1985	Private Property	—	36	Casablanca
"—" denotes releases that did not chart.

=== Singles ===
Year	Single	Chart positions							Certifications	Albums
Year	Single	US	US R&B	AUS	NZ	UK	CAN Top	CAN AC	Certifications	Albums
1968	"Competition Ain't Nothin'"; Little Carl Carlton	75	—	—	—	—	55	—		Can't Stop A Man in Love
1968	"46 Drums – 1 Guitar"; Little Carl Carlton	105	—	—	—	—	85	—		N/A
1969	"Look at Mary Wonder (How I Got Over)"; Little Carl Carlton	—	—	—	—	—	—	—		N/A
1969	"Don't Walk Away"	—	38	—	—	—	—	—		N/A
1970	"Drop by My Place"; Little Carl Carlton	78	12	—	—	—	—	—		Can't Stop A Man in Love
1971	"I Can Feel It" / "You've Got So Much (To Learn About Love)"	—	47	—	—	—	—	—		N/A
1972	"I Won't Let That Chump Break Your Heart"	—	42	—	—	—	—	—		Can't Stop a Man in Love
1973	"You Can't Stop a Man in Love"	—	81	—	—	—	—	—		Can't Stop a Man in Love
1974	"Everlasting Love"	6	11	—	—	—	19	11		Everlasting Love
1975	"Smokin' Room"	91	13	—	—	—	—	—		Everlasting Love
1975	"Morning, Noon and Nightime"	—	71	—	—	—	—	—		Everlasting Love
1976	"Ain't Gonna Tell Nobody (About You)"	—	67	—	—	—	—	—		I Wanna Be with You
1980	"This Feeling's Rated X-Tra"	—	57	—	—	—	—	—		Carl Carlton
1981	"She's a Bad Mama Jama (She's Built, She's Stacked)"	22	2	—	27	34	—	—	RIAA: Gold	Carl Carlton
1982	"I Think It's Gonna Be Alright"	—	65	—	—	—	—	—		Carl Carlton
1982	"Baby I Need Your Loving"	103	17	12	—	—	27	—		The Bad C.C.
1983	"Swing That Sexy Thang"	—	54	—	—	—	—	—		The Bad C.C.
1985	"Private Property"	—	28	—	—	—	—	—		Private Property
1986	"Slipped, Tripped (Fooled Around and Fell in Love)"	—	88	—	—	—	—	—		Private Property
"—" denotes releases that did not chart or were not released in that territory.

== Television appearances ==
Year	Title	Notes	Refs.
1970	The Merv Griffin Show		
1974	The Midnight Special		
1974, 1982	American Bandstand	Two episodes	
1974, 1981, 1983	Soul Train	Three episodes	
2003	American Soundtrack: Rhythm, Love and Soul	Television documentary special	
