= Norman Fox & The Rob-Roys =

American 1950s doo-wop group from New York

- Origin: The Bronx, New York City, U.S.
- Genres: Doo-wop, R&B
- Years active: 1956–2000s
- Labels: Back Beat, Capitol,
- Past members: Bob Trotman; Andre Lilly; Marshall "Buzzy" Helfand; Norman Fox; Robert Thierer; Les Levine; Jay McKnight; Nelson "Tino" Alvarez; Bernard "BJ" Jones; Paul Schneller; Alex Augustine; Stuart Morgan; Leon McClain; Warren Tesoro

Norman Fox & The Rob-Roys are an American 1950s doo-wop group from The Bronx, New York, United States.

== Background ==
The group formed in New York in 1956, and were one of the few interracial groups recording at this time. The group takes its name from the Rob Roy cocktail. The members of the group were Norman Fox (lead), Bob Trotman (first tenor), Andre Lilly (second tenor), Robert Thierer (baritone), and Marshall "Buzzy" Helfand (bass). The group signed to the Back Beat label, a subsidiary of Duke/Peacock in 1957, and recorded three singles, generally upbeat doo-wop tracks: "Tell Me Why", "Lover Doll", and "Dance Girl Dance".

The group then signed to Capitol Records in 1958. Helfand left the group at this time, and was replaced by new bass Paul Schneller. One single was recorded, "Pizza Pie", but it was not released until 1959, since they were still on contract with Backbeat. In 1961, the group had, once again, gone to Capitol Records, and recorded as The Temptations, but did not have their songs issued. After having to record more unissued singles (Time Records), the group split in 1963.

The group reunited for a show in 1971, with Fox, Trotman, Lilly, and Thierer. After another gap, the group returned in 1986 with Fox, Thierer, Stuart Morgan (first tenor; he'd toured with a Drifters group and performed with The Channels in the late 1990s-early 2000s), Alex Augustine (second tenor; former member of The Charts), and Leon McClain (bass, of The Quinns). In the early 90s, the group recorded several a cappella tracks for multiple Starlight Records compilation albums. Some featured Norman's daughter Kim on lead vocals. By this time, Morgan and McClain had been replaced by Nelson "Tino" Alvarez and Les Levine. Later, the group was Fox, Thierer, Augustine, Alvarez, and Jay McKnight, a previous member of The Dubs. Levine was a member of The Del Vikings.

As of 2004, the group was Fox, Thierer, Alvarez, the returning Leon McClain, and Warren Tesoro (second tenor; joined 2003).

Robert Thierer died on January 23, 2022.

Bob Trotman died on March 22, 2023.
