= The Cap-Tans =

American R&B group

- The Cap-Tans in 1950.

Background information
- Also known as: The Buddies, L' Cap-Tans
- Origin: Washington, D.C.
- Genres: R&B
- Years active: 1948–1953 1958–1978
- Labels: DC, Gotham, Dot, Corral
- Past members: Floyd Bennett; Alfred "Buddy" Slaughter; Lester Fountain; Sherman Buckner; Harmon Bethea; Lester Britton; Richard Stewart; Elmo "Chico" Anderson; Francis Henry

The Cap-Tans were an American R&B group formed in Washington, D.C., in 1948. Originally known as the Buddies, the ensemble was managed by impresario Lillian Claiborne, who helped establish the Cap-Tans regionally. Checkered with disbandments and line-up changes, major commercial success eluded the group for most of its career; however, several of their songs were later covered by notable doo-wop bands such as the Ravens and the Crows. As a result, the Cap-Tans' material has remained in the conscience of R&B enthusiasts.

== History ==
Prior to the Cap-Tans, the group initially promoted themselves as the Buddies, with a line-up that featured Floyd Bennett (first tenor), Alfred "Buddy" Slaughter (second tenor), Lester Fountain (baritone, guitar) and Sherman Buckner (tenor lead). Bennett and Slaughter first teamed up in a post-World War II trio that attempted, but failed to negotiate a recording contract while in New York City. After the third member departed, Bennett and Slaughter recruited Fountain and Buckner to form the Buddies, which soon came under the management of Lillian Claiborne in 1948. When Claiborne started arranging bookings for the Buddies, the group promoted itself as the Cap-Tans. Late in 1948, Claiborne convinced Harmon Bethea (bass) to leave the gospel group the Progressive Four Voices and join the Cap-Tans.

The Cap-Tans appeared on the radio show of deejay Paul Chapman, joining him in a rendition of "Coo-Coo Jug-Jug (That's the Sound of the Birds)". Chapman was so impressed with the broadcast that he enlisted the group in a recording of the song, backed by his composition "You'll Always Be My Sweetheart", which was released on DC Records in June 1949. For the remainder of the year, the Cap-Tans recorded a public service announcement berating the evils of sexually transmitted diseases which appeared on the ABC Network in October 1, and released their follow-up single "Goodnight Mother". On February 4, 1950, the group signed a recording contract with Claiborne and her silent partner Winfield Adams, thereby giving them permission to sell and advertise their recordings in any manner.

In April 1950, the Cap-Tans recorded "My My Ain't She Pretty" and "Never Be Lonely", which were sold to Gotham Records for distribution. However, the single was a financial flop, and the record label's co-founder Ivin Ballen refused to listen to, let alone distribute, the ensemble's next single, the Ink Spots-esque "I'm So Crazy for Love", that was instead released on Dot Records in August 1950. Although it failed to reach the national charts, "I'm So Crazy for Love" performed so well regionally—the single sold 15,000 copies in the first week—that the Ravens covered it in December. Its B-side, "Crazy Bout My Honey Dip" was also recorded by the Sparrows (as "Hey") and the Saigons (as "Honey Gee"). The Cap-Tans' second Dot record "Chief, Turn the Horse on Me", released in December, later was revived by the Crows on their rendition, titled "Call the Doctor". Although the group was poorly managed throughout its duration, especially on its final two records for Gotham and Corral Records, they were particularly popular at the Howard Theatre, and smaller clubs such as Club Caverns, the Blue Mirror, the Five O'Clock Club.

After Fountain was drafted into the service in 1951, the Cap-Tans stayed on the live circuit for two more years, but disbanded in 1953. However, the group found a second life in 1958 when Bethea reinvented the band as L' Cap-Tans (to sound "exotically Spanish") with a line-up that included Lester Britton (lead), Richard Stewart (first tenor, baritone), Elmo "Chico" Anderson (second tenor), Bethea (baritone), and Francis Henry (guitar). More singles followed until finally in 1968, under the moniker the Agents, the group earned two national hits with "One Eye Open" and "My Wife, My Dog, My Cat". The group performed well into the 1970s and finally disbanded in 1978.
