= Brontosaurus (Tkay Maidza song) =

2013 single by Tkay Maidza

Single by Tkay Maidza featuring Bad Cop
- Released: 6 December 2013
- Length: 3:02
- Label: Tkay Maidza
- Songwriter(s): Takudzwa Maidza; Mario Spate
- Producer(s): Badcop

Tkay Maidza singles chronology
"Brontosaurus" (2013)	"U-Huh" (2014)

"Brontosaurus" is a song by Australian singer-songwriter Tkay Maidza featuring producer Bad Cop, released in December 2013 as Maidza's debut single. The song peaked at number 89 on the ARIA Charts.

== Reception ==
Beat Magazine said "Tkay's verses hitting premature dead ends to only give way to an excruciatingly choppy chorus hook. Producer Bad Cop tries to cram countless buildups, using a garish blend of dancehall and dubstep, none of which result in a satisfying drop." OutInPerth called it "an infectious underground rap hit."

In 2020, Red Bull retrospectively reviewed the song saying "The track introduced then 17-year-old Tkay as a formidable talent. It also typified the sound of her early years -- a blend of hip-hop and fun, energetic electronic music. Her sound has evolved a lot since then, but 'Brontosaurus' remains a banger.

== Track listings ==
=== digital download ===
1. "Brontosaurus" – 3:03
2. "Handle My Ego" – 3:35

=== digital download ===
1. "Brontosaurus" (Mobin Master & Tom Pierre Remix) – 4:39

== Charts ==
Chart performance for "Brontosaurus"
Chart (2013)	Peak position
Australia (ARIA)	89
