= The Vocaleers =

American musical group

- The Vocaleers in 1953

Background information
- Also known as: The Rainbows
- Origin: Harlem, New York, United States
- Genres: Doo-wop; R&B
- Years active: 1952–1961
- Labels: Red Robin; Old Town; Vest
- Past members: Joe Duncan; Herman Dunham; William Walker; Melvin Walton; Teddy Williams; Lamar Cooper; Joe Powell

The Vocaleers were an American doo-wop group formed in Harlem, New York, in 1952. Managed by record producer Bobby Robinson, the group released a string of regional hits and scored one national R&B hit with the song "Is It a Dream" in 1953. Highlighted by the distinctive vocal delivery of Joe Duncan, "Is It a Dream" became a standard component of several R&B acts in Harlem and, briefly, the Vocaleers were among the most popular attractions of the city's music scene.

== History ==
In 1952, the first version of the Vocaleers, featuring Joe Duncan (lead vocals), Herman Dunham (first tenor), William Walker (second tenor), Melvin Walton (baritone) and Teddy Williams (bass), came together after some of the members met each other while playing in a local Davega Stores-sponsored softball league. Originally known as the Rainbows, the group was managed by Jimmy Manning, a former gospel singer who performed with Brook Benton and Howard Lymon Sr. in the Harlemaires. The Rainbows' live appearances were initially limited to school assemblies, but they began receiving exposure at contests arranged at the Apollo Theater with Duncan's song "My Love". Late in 1952, in a record store on 116th Street, the Rainbows demoed another Duncan original, "Be True", with the manager accompanying them on ukulele. Impressed by the song, the manager delivered the demo to Bobby Robinson, who signed the Rainbows to a recording contract on Red Robin Records.

In December 1952, the group, then known as the Vocaleers, recorded and released "Be True", paired with "Oh Where", for their debut single. It became a regional hit in cities such as New York City, Philadelphia, and Los Angeles, characterized by Duncan's unusual vocal delivery, which he explained in an interview: "I sing through my nose; I don't do it from the diaphragm.... I have a yo-yo funny voice". For a brief while, the group was the most popular act in Harlem; music writer Nelson George compared the Vocaleers' popularity in the district to sport figures Jackie Robinson and Willie Mays. As the single continued to sell well, the Vocaleers gigged at Lloyd's Manor in Newark, but were forced to replace Williams, who suffered from a case of stage fright followed by tuberculosis, with neighborhood friend Lamar Cooper.

Awarding them with a new, lucrative five-year contract, Robinson assembled the Vocaleers back into the studio in March 1953 to record six additional songs. Among the set, "Is It a Dream" and "Hurry Home" were distributed as the Vocaleers follow-up single, which rose to number four on the Billboard R&B charts in June. Soon, local doo wop groups incorporated "Is It a Dream" into their own repertoire, making it a standard of the doo wop music genre, and, with its good fortune, the Vocaleers were packaged in tours alongside other acts. Some of the groups/musicians the Vocaleers performed with include Dinah Washington, the Five Royales, Pigmeat Markham, and Arnett Cobb.

Robinson called the group back to the studio to record "I Walk Alone" and "How Soon", much to the reluctance of Duncan, who feared the new record would take sales away from "Is It a Dream". When "I Walk Alone" was not too commercially successful, the group recorded their fourth single "Will You Be True" in December 1953, before Dunham announced he was leaving the Vocaleers, possibly over disputes with lead vocal duties. Replaced by Joe Powell, Dunham, adopting the stage name Herman Curtis, joined the Solitaires soon after. However, the Vocaleers did not survive long after Dunham's departure, with Walker and Walton leaving to form the Savoys in July 1954 and Duncan joining the military. Robinson, who still retained rights to the act's name, recorded one song, "If Your Heart Aches", with unknown session musicians.

When Duncan returned from the service in late 1958, he reformed the Vocaleers with most of the original line-up. They recorded tunes for Old Town Records and Vest Records in 1959 and 1960 before disbanding for the last time in 1962. In recognition of their contributions to R&B music, the Vocaleers were inducted into the UGHA Hall of Fame in April 1996.

== Discography ==
=== Singles ===
Red Robin Records

- "Be True" b/w "Oh Where", December 1952
- "Is It a Dream" b/w "Hurry Home", March 1953
- "I Walk Alone" b/w "How Soon", August 1953
- " Love You" b/w "Will You Be True", January 1954
- "Angel Face" b/w "Lovin' Baby", August 1954

Old Town Records

- "I Need Your Love So Bad" b/w "Have You Ever Loved Someone", August 1959
- "Love and Devotion" b/w "This Is the Night", September 1960

Vest Records

- "The Night Is Quiet" b/w "Hear My Plea", 1960
