= Jukebox Saturday Night =

Song performed by Glenn Miller

- RCA Victor 78, 1942

Single by Glenn Miller and His Orchestra
- B-side: "Sleepy Town Train"
- Released: 1942
- Recorded: July 15, 1942
- Studio: Chicago
- Genre: Dance band
- Length: 3:07
- Label: RCA Victor Records
- Composer: Paul McGrane
- Lyricist: Albert Stillman

"Juke Box Saturday Night" is a song written by Al Stillman and Paul McGrane. It was recorded and first released by Glenn Miller and his Orchestra in 1942 on RCA Victor, with vocals by Marion Hutton, Tex Beneke, and The Modernaires. The song was from the 1942 production Stars on Ice, where it was first performed live on July 2, 1942.

The Glenn Miller recording peaked at number 7 on the Billboard pop singles chart in 1942. The song became a pop and big band standard that defined the era.

== Background ==
The song was first recorded on July 15, 1942 in Chicago by Glenn Miller and his Orchestra on RCA Victor. The 78 single was released in October 1942, peaking at number 7 on the Billboard pop singles chart. The B side was "Sleepy Town Train", recorded the following day. The Stars on Ice cast did the first live performance on July 2, 1942.

Glenn Miller was one of the top-selling musical performers of the 1940s, whose recordings were in every jukebox in America. "By the early 1940s, a third of all records played on American jukeboxes were Glenn Miller recordings."

The song highlights three top big band leaders of the era: Benny Goodman, Kay Kyser, and Glenn Miller. There are also tributes to Harry James and The Ink Spots, whose styles are invoked.

== Cover versions ==
1942 sheet music cover. Stars on Ice. Mutual Music Society.

- "Juke Box Saturday Night" was later covered by Nino and the Ebb Tides, whose version charted at #57 on Billboard's Top 100 on September 4, 1961. This was an updated version of the 1942 song in a rock and roll style.
- The Modernaires recorded a version in 1946 on Columbia Records featuring Paula Kelly with Mitchell Ayres. A soundie was also filmed in 1944 featuring Harriet Clark on vocals with The Modernaires: Tommy Morgan, Hal Dickinson, Fran Scott, and Ralph Brewster. The Modernaires also released an updated version of the song entitled "New Juke Box Saturday Night" in 1953 on Coral Records with George Cates.
- Teresa Brewer recorded the song in 1983.
- Winifred Atwell recorded the song in 1960.
