= Back Beat Records =

American record label

- Founded: 1957
- Genre: Soul
- Country of origin: United States

Back Beat Records was an American record label launched in 1957, as the Houston-based soul sub-label of Duke Records, when it was run by Don Robey. ABC Records assumed ownership of Back Beat on May 23, 1973, as part of ABC's acquisition of Back Beat's parent label Duke. The label's biggest hits included "Treat Her Right" by Roy Head & The Traits, "Tell Me Why" by Norman Fox & The Rob-Roys and "Everlasting Love" by Carl Carlton. The last of these was the title cut of an album intended to be issued on Back Beat in December 1974, but ABC ended up issuing the album on their main label, as they had discontinued Back Beat at the last minute.

There are many records from Back Beat that found fame but not fortune, as the records are part of the underground movement known as Northern soul. Carl Carlton probably recorded the most tracks that fall into the Northern soul sound.

== Back Beat label variations ==
=== Independent distribution ===
- 1957-1959: White, lime green and dark blue "kettle drum" label
- 1959-1973: Red, white and yellow label with yellow drumsticks

=== ABC distribution ===
- 1973-1974: White and red label with yellow drumsticks
- 1974: Dark green and blue label with "abc Back Beat" ("abc" circle logo) between two lines, all in white. Only one record was released with this format: "Everlasting Love" by Carl Carlton (BB 27001, originally released on the white and red label)

== Back Beat recording artists ==
- Carl Carlton (born 1952)
- Bobby Doyle (1939–2006)
- Norman Fox & The Rob-Roys
- Roy Head (1941–2020)
- Joe Hinton (1929–1968)
- Eddie Wilson
- Doodle Owens (1939–1999)
- O.V. Wright (1939–1980)

== See also ==
- List of record labels
