= Silent Assassin (song) =

2023 single by Tkay Maidza and Flume

Single by Tkay Maidza and Flume

from the album Sweet Justice
- Released: 7 July 2023
- Length: 2:07
- Label: 4AD; Dew Process
- Songwriters: Takudzwa Maidza; Harley Streten
- Producer: Flume

Tkay Maidza singles chronology
"Be Somebody" (2023)	"Silent Assassin" (2023)	"Ring-a-Ling" (2023)

Flume singles chronology
"Slugger 1.4 (2014 Export.WAV)" (2022)	"Silent Assassin" (2023)	"Track 1" (2025)

"Silent Assassin" is a song by Australian singer-songwriter Tkay Maidza and Australian electronic musician Flume released on 7 July 2023 as the lead single from Maidza's second studio album, Sweet Justice.

In a press statement, Maidza said "I like to move in silence, but this song is a reminder that people shouldn't count me out or underestimate my abilities; they should be afraid when I'm quiet as I come back more evolved".

At the 2023 ARIA Music Awards, the song was nominated for Best Hip Hop/Rap Release .

The song was nominated for Best Single at the Rolling Stone Australia Awards.

== Music video ==
The Milo Lee directed music video premiered on YouTube on 6 July 2023. It sees a battle-ready Maidza performing her song in the desert.

== Reception ==
Conor Lochrie from Rolling Stone Australia said "The track is anthem of self-empowerment and self-confidence, the sound of two artists at the top of their game combining to strong effect."

Courtney Fry from Triple J called the collaboration "the link up of the year... showing off the precision and speed of both artists." Fry said "With Tkay's laser-focused bars and Flume's abrasive production, it's one that'll ring around in your ears for ages."

Walden Green from The Fader said "On 'Silent Asassin' [sic]... both artists are most definitely in the zone."

== Charts ==
Chart performance for "Silent Assassin"
Chart (2023)	Peak position
New Zealand Hot Singles (RMNZ)	21
