= The Zircons =

- Also known as: The Zirkons
- Years active: 1959–1967

The Zircons were a vocal-based, doo-wop style musical group from Harlem and later the Bronx, New York, in the late 1950s and 1960s.

== Zircons (1959–1963) ==
Vocal doo wop group from East Harlem, New York. Active between 1959 and 1964. The original members of The Zircons (spelled with a c) included:

- Jimmy Gerenetski (lead)
- Neil Colello
- John Loiacono
- Ken Pulicine
- Donald Lewis

Their biggest hit was a 1963 cover of "Lonely Way", The Sky-liner's 1959 recording. They followed it up with "Your Way" on Mellomood Record Co.

== The Zirkons (1964–1967) ==
In 1964, six singers from the Bronx, New York, formed an a cappella (or doo-wop) group. The Zirkons (spelt with k) had the following line-up:

- Mario Ibañez (lead)
- Carlos Infante (baritone)
- Leo Perez (1st tenor)
- Robert McInerney (2nd tenor)
- Neal Stuart (Schoenberg) (1st/2nd tenor, falsetto lead)
- Barry Zakir (baritone/bass)

The Zirkons recorded on various record labels, including Old Timer / Cat-Time / Catamount / Amber (as The Zirkons) and on Snowflake Records (as The Zirkons).

Their repertory included:

- 1964: "You Are My Sunshine", "Silver Bells" and "Stormy Weather" [Old Timer Records]
- 1965: "Blue Moon", "Remember Then", "Unchained Melody", "You Baby You" [Catamount Records]
- 1966: "One Summer Night", "Lone Stranger"
- 1967: "Here in My Heart"

Other songs included "Come Dance With Me", "Crazy For You", "Glory of Love", "My Own True Love", "Never", "Blue Moon", "Once In A While", "Sincerely", "Smile", "Sunday Kind Of Love", and "The Wind.”
