= Tkay =

Studio album by Tkay Maidza
- Released: 28 October 2016
- Recorded: 2014–16
- Genres: Synth-pop; hip hop; electronic
- Length: 47:54
- Label: Dew Process
- Producers: Christoph Andersson; Noah Breakfast; Dre Skull; Daniel Farber; Friend Within; Stefan Gräslund; King Henry; Dann Hume; LK McKay; Salva; Swick; What So Not; George Maple; Djemba Djemba

Tkay Maidza chronology
| Switch Tape (2014) | Tkay (2016) | Last Year Was Weird (Vol. 1) (2018) |

Singles from Tkay
- 1. "Carry On" Released: 30 August 2016; 2. "Simulation" Released: 16 October 2016

Tkay is the debut studio album by Australian singer and rapper Tkay Maidza. It was released on 28 October 2016 by Dew Process and peaked at number 20 on the ARIA Charts.

At the ARIA Music Awards of 2017, the album was nominated for Best Urban Album and Breakthrough Artist.

== Background ==
The concept for the album began in 2014, around the time Maidza was working on her debut extended play, entitled Switch Tape. The EP was released in October 2014, through Dew Process Records. In December 2014, Maidza announced that she was working on her debut studio album.

In 2016, Maidza gained greater international notice when she collaborated with DJ and record producer Martin Solveig on his single "Do It Right". "Do It Right" sparked Maidza's lead single from the album, "Carry On", which features vocals from rapper Killer Mike,

In the beginning of October 2016, the album's first promotional single was released, entitled "Tennies". Two weeks after, the album's second official single, entitled "Simulation", was released on 16 October 2016. The song was revealed to have been co-written with rising electronic musician George Maple, who previously co-wrote and co-produced Maidza's song "Ghost".

== Reception ==
In a 3 ½ star rating, music journalist Bernard Zuel said "It's no surprise Tkay Maidza's debut album arrives fully sprung: performing live, the Adelaide-based rapper/singer is a ball of energy with a rapid flow to match the tempo... Maidza's energy is channelled and modified so tempos are varied without losing drive. R&B feels like her home turf instead of a token effort, and there's a natural link between songs incorporating the perspective of a young woman facing the world straight on. Her vocals are more adaptable than expected: clarity is allowed more of a show at times so her strong lyrical core comes through; and her singing – not her strength but clearly a long-term plan – reveals welcome imperfection rather than weakness."

Daniel Patrin from Renowned for Sound said "TKAY serves as a soulful party dream. Executed and displayed with a fiery pressure and physical organisation, it's humbled in an artistic rawness that demands sharp attention."

Chelsey Deeley from Music Feeds said "Containing pure dance-movers, hip-hop tinged electronics and fiery rapping delivery, you'll spend more time moving your feet than you will analysing the subject matter". Adding "Take this album for what it is, a punchy, eclectic mix of dance floor bangers, and the sassy, yet playful rhetoric of a home-grown star on the rise."

== Track listing ==
| No. | Title | Writer(s) | Producer(s) | Length |
|---|---|---|---|---|
| 1. | "Always Been" | Takudzwa Maidza; Andrea Fratangelo; Danny Omerhodic | Swick; Lewis Cancut | 3:20 |
| 2. | "Afterglow" | Maidza; Jess Higgs; Chris Emerson; Andrew Fitzgerald Swanson; Nat Dunn | What So Not; George Maple; Djemba Djemba | 3:00 |
| 3. | "Carry On" (featuring Killer Mike) | Maidza; Daniel Benjamin Cobbe; Michael Render | Dann Hume | 3:33 |
| 4. | "Simulation" | Maidza; Luke McKay; Higgs | LK McKay | 3:25 |
| 5. | "Tennies" | Maidza; Paul Salva, Jr. | Salva | 3:17 |
| 6. | "Monochrome" | Maidza; Lee Mortimer | Friend Within | 3:29 |
| 7. | "Follow Me" | Maidza; Higgs; Andrew Hershey | Dre Skull | 3:47 |
| 8. | "Castle in the Sky" | Maidza; Daniel Farber | Farber | 3:20 |
| 9. | "Drumsticks No Guns" | Maidza; Stefan Gräslund | Gräslund | 2:43 |
| 10. | "State of Mind" | Maidza; Noah Beresin; Dunn | Noah Breakfast | 3:27 |
| 11. | "House of Cards" | Maidza; Henry Allen; Dunn | King Henry | 4:07 |
| 12. | "Supasonic" | Maidza; McKay | LK McKay | 2:38 |
| 13. | "You Want" | Maidza; McKay | LK McKay | 3:40 |
| 14. | "At Least I Know" | Maidza; Christoph Andersson | Andersson | 4:08 |
| Total length: | | | | 47:54 |

== Charts ==
| Chart (2016) | Peak position |
|---|---|
| Australian Albums (ARIA) | 20 |

== Release history ==
| Country | Date | Format | Label | Catalogue |
|---|---|---|---|---|
| Various | 28 October 2016 | digital download; CD; LP | Dew Process | DEW9000887-DEW9000896 |
| North America | late 2016 | digital download; CD; LP | Interscope Records | —N/a |
| Europe | January 2017 | digital download; CD | Kitsuné Music | CDB-068 |
