= The Dubs =

American doo wop vocal group

- Origin: Harlem, New York, United States
- Genres: Doo wop
- Years active: 1956–1958; 1959–present
- Labels: Johnson, Gone, ABC-Paramount, Josie
- Members: Leslie Anderson (lead); Don Raphael (bass); Donald Moyer (tenor)
- Past members: Cleveland Still; Richard Blandon; Billy Carlisle; James "Jake" Miller; Thomas Gardner; Tommy Grate; Cordell Brown; Kirk Harris; Dave Shelley; Jay McKnight; Bobby 'T-Boy' Taylor; Robert Taylor Jr; Kenny White; Danny Foy; Michael Smith; Doretha Gills; Darryl Blandon

The Dubs are an American doo wop vocal group formed in 1956, best known for their songs "Could This Be Magic", "Don't Ask Me to Be Lonely" and "Chapel of Dreams".

== Original career, 1956-1958 ==
The original members of the Dubs were:

Richard Blandon (born September 16, 1934 Montgomery, Alabama – died December 30, 1991, New York) (lead)
Cleveland Still (born October 17, 1934 – died July 17, 2026 (first tenor)
William "Billy" Carlisle (born September 25, 1934 – died May 1996) (second tenor)
James "Jake" Miller (baritone)
Thomas Gardner, replaced in 1957 by Tommy Grate (bass)

The Dubs formed from the merging of two short-lived vocal groups in Harlem, New York, The Five Wings and The Scale-Tones. The Five Wings (originally "The 5 Stars") were an up-and-coming group with members Jackie Rue (lead, later of Jackie and the Starlites), Frank Edwards (tenor), Billy Carlisle (second tenor), Melvin Flood (baritone), and Tommy Grate (bass). They recorded for King Records in 1955, but when they were unable to find success, the group began to splinter. Rue, Flood, and Edwards left, Kenny "Butch" Hamilton joined, and, shortly afterwards, Carlisle's cousin Richard Blandon was in following his discharge from the United States Air Force. Meanwhile, The Scale-Tones had been formed by James "Jake" Miller and Thomas Gardner, who had added Cleveland Still (lead), James Montgomery, and Don Archer. They made one record on the Jay-Dee label in early 1956.

After some prompting by Blandon when he showed up at a Scale-Tones' rehearsal, a new group emerged. This included Blandon and Carlisle from the Five Wings, and Still, Miller and Gardner from the Scale-Tones. The Five Wings' manager, Buddy Johnson's brother Hiram, offered to manage the new group. As The Marvels, they recorded an unsuccessful single, "I Won't Have You Breaking My Heart", for ABC-Paramount.

The group then renamed themselves The Dubs, and released Blandon's song "Don't Ask Me To Be Lonely" on the Johnson label set up by their manager. Radio acceptance was almost immediate, and the record was picked up for national release on George Goldner's Gone label. It peaked at #72 on the Billboard Hot 100 charts in the summer of 1957, although like all their other records it surprisingly failed to make the R&B chart. Gardner then left the group to be replaced by Tommy Grate.

The group's next single, "Could This Be Magic", also written by Blandon, was another pop hit, rising to #23 later in 1957 and becoming recognized over the years as a doo-wop classic. This success landed the group a spot on an Alan Freed package and they toured extensively in the U.S. and Canada.

However, subsequent singles from the group were less successful and, in November 1958 the group decided to split up, disappointed over their meagre earnings. Blandon joined The Vocaleers (who had previously had a 1953 hit, "Is It A Dream"), and the other members found jobs outside the music industry.

== Later versions of the group ==
In July 1959, some eight months after its initial release, "Chapel of Dreams" was reissued and rose to #74 on the charts. To build on its relative success, Blandon left the Vocaleers and reformed The Dubs with Miller, Grate and Carlisle. Cleveland Still, then working as a shipping clerk, did not return, and was replaced by Cordell Brown. The group signed again with ABC-Paramount, and recorded a string of singles over the next two years. In 1962, Still temporarily returned to replace Brown, and the group recorded for several labels, including Josie for one side of a split album with The Shells, The Dubs Meet the Shells.

Richard Blandon kept the group active during the 1960s, often re-recording their old hits. By 1971 the group was a trio comprising Blandon, Still, and tenor Kirk Harris, and in 1973 they added baritone Dave Shelley.

In the mid 1980s the partnership between Blandon and Still ended, with each forming their own version of The Dubs. Still's group included lead Leslie Anderson, Bernard Jones, John "Spider" Truesdale and Stephen Brown.

Blandon's group included Harris, Jay McKnight, and Kenny White; by 1990, Harris and White had left and been replaced by Danny Foy, Michael Smith, and Doretha Gills. After Richard Blandon died in 1991, his brother, Darryll, took over the lead. The group with Darryl recorded an album, The Magic is Back, in 1997. McKnight later joined Norman Fox & The Rob-Roys.

Stephen Brown died in 1989. John "Spider" Truesdale died in 2017, and Bernard "BJ" Jones died between 2018 and 2021.
