= Jackie & the Starlites =

- Origin: United States
- Genres: Doo-wop
- Years active: 1960–1963
- Labels: Fury Records, Mascot Records
- Past members: Jackie LaRue; Alton Thomas; John Felix; Billy Montgomery; Darryl York

Jackie & the Starlites were an American doo wop group active between 1960 and 1963.

Their leader, Jackie LaRue, sang with The Five Wings (who recorded for King Records in 1955) and The Dubs prior to joining the Starlites in 1960. They are best known for the single "Valerie" (or "Valarie"), cut for Fury Records in 1960. The song reached the lower echelons of the U.S. charts that year, and featured LaRue literally breaking down into a fit of crying jags over a lost love. Their lone other charting hit was for Mascot Records in 1962, a tune called "I Found Out Too Late" which reached #17 on the R&B charts. By 1963 the group was defunct.

"Valarie" was later covered by Frank Zappa on the album Burnt Weeny Sandwich, another version of which was included on the 2010 rerelease of Cruising with Ruben & the Jets as Greasy Love Songs.

== Members ==
- Jackie LaRue
- Alton Thomas
- John Felix
- Billy Montgomery
- Darryl York
