= OutInPerth =

Australian LGBT publication

OUTinPerth
- Type: Website
- Editor: Graeme Watson, Leigh Andrew Hill
- Founded: 2002
- Language: English
- Website: www.outinperth.com

OUTinPerth is an online LGBTIQA+ publication in Perth, Western Australia. The website covers local, national, and international LGBTIQA+ news. It is owned and operated by Graeme Watson and Leigh Andrew Hill.

While it was originally found in over 300 bars, shops and any locations across Western Australia, OUTinPerth became a fully online publication in February 2019.

The publication halted briefly in April 2016 when its owners went into liquidation. It resumed after its staff bought the rights and conducted a fundraising campaign.
