= Tkay Maidza =

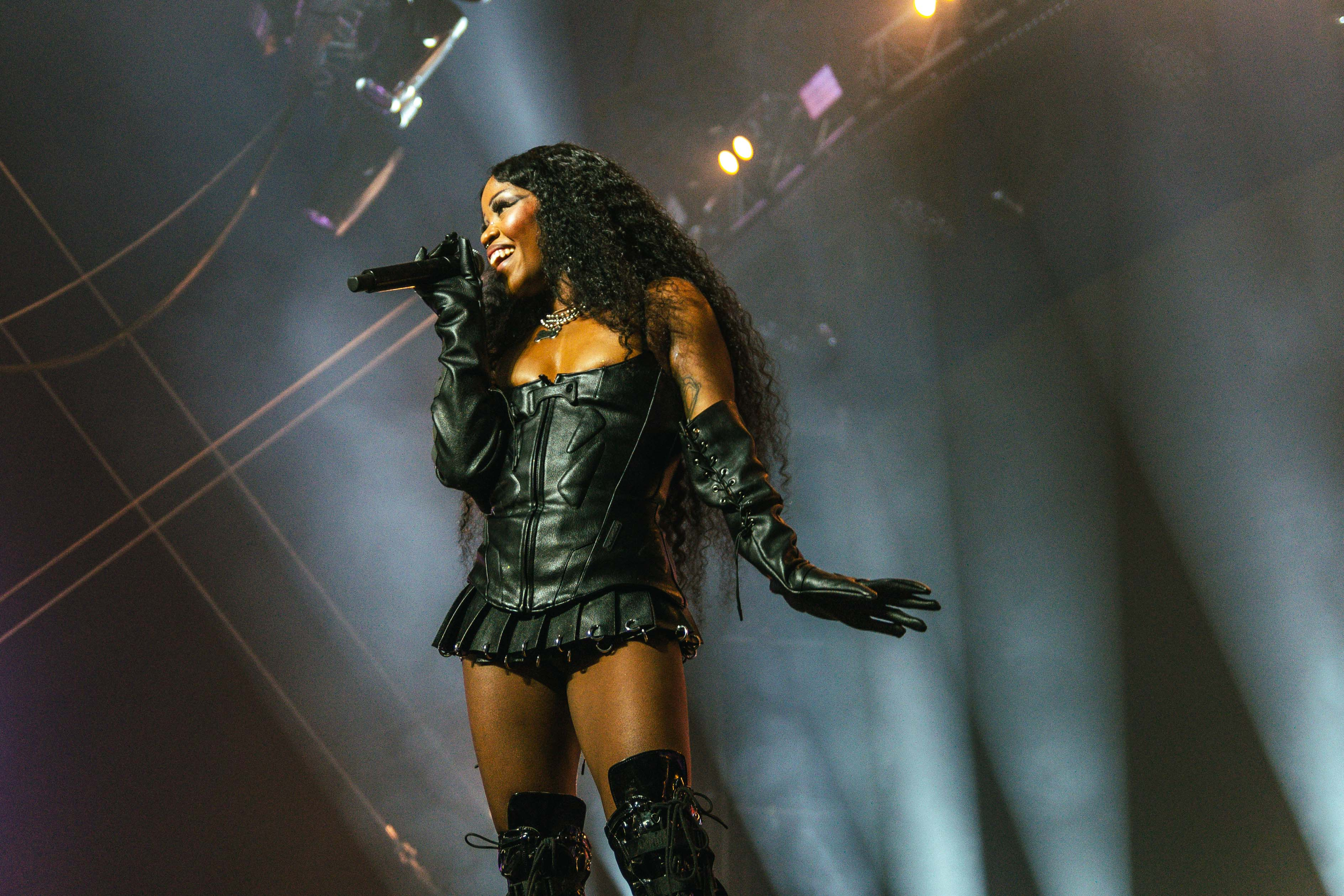
- Maidza performing in 2024

Background information
- Born: Takudzwa Victoria Rosa Maidza; 17 December 1995 (age 30); Harare, Zimbabwe
- Origin: Adelaide, South Australia
- Genres: Hip hop; synthpop; dance-pop; electronic; alternative R&B
- Occupations: Singer-songwriter; rapper
- Instrument: Vocals
- Years active: 2013–present
- Labels: 4AD; Dew Process; Kitsuné; Downtown; Universal Music Australia (UMA); Interscope
- Website: www.tkaymaidza.com

Takudzwa Victoria Rosa "Tkay" Maidza (/tiːˈkeɪ ˈmaɪdzə/ tee-KAY MY-dzə; (born 17 December 1995) is a Zimbabwean-born Australian singer-songwriter and hip hop artist from Adelaide, South Australia. She has been nominated for and won many awards, and released two albums: Tkay (2016) and Sweet Justice (2023). She collaborated with Flume on her 2023 single "Silent Assassin".

== Early life and education ==
Takudzwa Victoria Rosa Maidza was born in Harare, Zimbabwe. Her mother is an industrial chemist and her father a metallurgist. Her father played in bands, mostly traditional Zimbabwean or African folk music, and the family used to go along and watch.

In 2001, her family moved to Australia when she was five years old. They lived in Perth and Kalgoorlie in Western Australia and then in Whyalla in South Australia, before relocating to Adelaide in 2010.

Maidza graduated from St Michael's College, Henley Beach, in 2012, and started studying architecture at the University of South Australia before becoming a full-time musician. She took part in Adelaide's Northern Sound System artist development program.

She also turned her back on a promising career as a professional tennis player, having spent eight years training for it.

== Career ==
=== 2013–2017: Switch Tape and Tkay ===
In January 2013, Maidza uploaded "Handle My Ego" featuring Badcop onto triple J unearthed. In December 2013, Maidza released her debut single, "Brontosaurus" with producer BadCop. The song peaked at number 89 on the ARIA Charts. This was followed by "U-Huh", produced by Adelaide born, now Sydney based Dew Process producer, LK McKay, in July 2014, which was certified platinum in 2022.

In October 2014, Maidza released her debut EP and mixtape, Switch Tape, featuring collaborations with Night Slugs' Bok Bok and producer SBTRKT.

Maidza has played Splendour in the Grass and the CMJ Music Marathon in 2014 and at the 2015 St Jerome's Laneway Festival. She performed at the Triple J "Beat the Drum" concert in 2015 to celebrate the 40th anniversary of the radio station, both as a solo artist and with many other Australian guest rappers on an extended version of Hilltop Hoods' "Cosby Sweater". Maidza played most of the Australian major festivals in 2015, including Groovin' the Moo, Falls Festival, Meredith Festival, and a cameo at Stereosonic with WhatSoNot.

In May 2016, Martin Solveig released the Maidza featured single, "Do It Right".

On 30 August 2016, Maidza released single "Carry On", featuring guest vocals from US rapper Killer Mike. The track is the first single from her debut album, titled Tkay, which was released on 28 October 2016. Tkay peaked at number 20 on the ARIA charts. The album was nominated for numerous awards at the ARIA Music Awards of 2017.

=== 2018–2022: Last Year Was Weird ===
In August 2018, Maidza released the first of a trilogy of EPs titled Last Year Was Weird.

In May 2020, Maidza announced she had signed with English independent label 4AD and released single "Shook" with praise from NME and Rolling Stone. In August 2020, Last Year Was Weird (Vol. 2) was released. At the ARIA Music Awards of 2020, the EP was nominated for Best Soul/R&B Release.

In February 2021, Maidza released her new track "Kim" with US artist Yung Baby Tate, in which she takes on the identities of various pop culture icons with the name, including rapper Lil' Kim and celebrity Kim Kardashian.

The third and final EP in her Last Year Was Weird series was released in July 2021. At the ARIA Music Awards of 2021, Last Year Was Weird (Vol. 3) won Best Soul/R&B Release.

On 19 November 2021, Maidza released "Real Nice (H.C.T.F.)" with Young Franco featuring Nerve, which served as the theme song for the A-League, the Australian and New Zealand professional soccer league.

=== 2023: Sweet Justice ===
In March 2023, Maidza's cover of Pixies' "Where Is My Mind?" was used in an AirPods commercial by Apple.

In July 2023, Maidza released "Silent Assassin" with Flume. This was followed by "Ring-a-Ling" and the announcement of her second studio album, Sweet Justice, which was subsequently released on 3 November 2023.

== Influences and style ==
Maidza said in 2016 that she admired the work of Kendrick Lamar, Santigold, Lauryn Hill, and Childish Gambino.

In 2021, she described her style as "left of anything. It's alternative hip-hop. Alternative pop. Alternative R&B".

== Personal life ==
In 2021, Maidza was living in Los Angeles.

== Discography ==
- Tkay (2016)
- Sweet Justice (2023)

== Awards and nominations ==
Maidza was awarded a Robert Stigwood Fellowship, which provided mentorship and professional development, by the Music Development Office in SA.

=== APRA Awards ===
The APRA Awards are held in Australia and New Zealand by the Australasian Performing Right Association to recognise songwriting skills, sales and airplay performance by its members annually.

Year	Nominee / work	Award	Result	Ref.
2016	"M.O.B" (Tkay Maidza, Luke McKay)	Urban Work of the Year	Nominated	
2023	"Bang My Line" (Cosmo's Midnight featuring Tkay Maidza)	Most Performed R&B / Soul Work of the Year	Nominated	
2024	"Ring-a-Ling"	Most Performed Hip Hop/Rap Work	Nominated	

=== ARIA Music Awards ===
The ARIA Music Awards is an annual awards ceremony that recognises excellence, innovation, and achievement across all genres of Australian music.

Year	Nominated work	Category	Result	Ref.
2017	TKAY	Breakthrough Artist	Nominated	
2017	TKAY	Best Urban Album	Nominated	
2019	"Awake"	Best Hip Hop Release	Nominated	
2020	Last Year Was Weird, Vol.2	Best Soul/R&B Release	Nominated	
2021	Last Year Was Weird, Vol.3	Best Soul/R&B Release	Won	
2021	Nicholas Muecke for Tkay Maidza's "24k"	Best Video	Nominated	
2023	"Silent Assassin" (with Flume)	Best Hip Hop/Rap Release	Nominated	
2024	Sweet Justice	Best Solo Artist	Nominated	
2024	Sweet Justice	Best Soul/R&B Release	Won	
2026	"Romanticize"	Best Soul/R&B Release	Nominated	

=== Berlin Music Video Awards ===
The Berlin Music Video Awards is an annual international festival that celebrate the art of music videos.

Year	Nominee / work	Award	Result	Ref.
2024	Ring-a-Ling	Best Art Director	Nominated	

=== BET Awards ===
The BET Awards is an American award show that was established in 2001 by the Black Entertainment Television network to celebrate black entertainers and other minorities in music, film, sports and philanthropy.

Year	Nominee / work	Award	Result	Ref.
2016	Tkay Maidza	International Viewers' Choice Award	Nominated	

=== J Awards ===
The J Awards are an annual series of Australian music awards that were established by the Australian Broadcasting Corporation's youth-focused radio station Triple J. They commenced in 2005.

Year	Nominee / work	Award	Result	Ref.
2020	"Don't Call Again" (featuring Kari Faux)	Australian Video of the Year	Nominated	

=== MTV Europe Music Awards ===
The MTV Europe Music Awards is an award presented by Viacom International Media Networks to honour artists and music in pop culture.

Year	Nominee / work	Award	Result	Ref.
2016	Herself	Best Australian Act	Nominated	
2018	Herself	Best Australian Act	Won	

=== National Live Music Awards ===
The National Live Music Awards are a broad recognition of Australia's diverse live industry, celebrating the success of the Australian live scene.

Year	Nominee / work	Award	Result	Ref.
2016	Herself	Live Hip Hop Act of the Year	Won	
2016	Herself	International Live Achievement (Solo)	Nominated	
2018	Herself	Live Hip Hop Act of the Year	Nominated	
2018	Herself	South Australian Live Voice of the Year	Won	
2023	Herself	Best Hip Hop Act	Nominated	

=== Rolling Stone Australia Awards ===
The Rolling Stone Australia Awards are awarded annually in January or February by the Australian edition of Rolling Stone magazine for outstanding contributions to popular culture in the previous year.

Year	Nominee / work	Award	Result	Ref.
2015	Tkay Maidza	Best New Artist	Won	
2021	Last Year Was Weird, Vol. 2	Best Record	Won	
2021	"Shook"	Best Single	Nominated	
2024	"Silent Assassin" (with Flume)	Best Single	Nominated	
2025	Sweet Justice	Best LP/EP	Shortlisted	

=== South Australian Music Awards ===
The South Australian Music Awards (previously known as the Fowler's Live Music Awards) are annual awards that exist to recognise, promote and celebrate excellence in the South Australian contemporary music industry. They commenced in 2012.

Year	Nominee / work	Award	Result (wins only)	Ref.
2014	Tkay Maidza	Best Electronica Artist	Won	
2015	Tkay Maidza	Best Release	Won	
2015	Tkay Maidza	Best Female	Won	
2015	Tkay Maidza	Best Song	Won	
2015	"Switch Lanes" (directed by Sachio Cook)	Best Video	Won	
2016	Tkay Maidza	Best Song	Won	
2016	"Do It Right" (with Martin Solveig)	Best International Collaboration	Won	
2017	Tkay Maidza	Best Female Artist	Won	
2018	Tkay Maidza	Most Popular Hip Hop Award	Won	
