= Nino and the Ebb Tides =

American doo-wop band

- Also known as: The Ebb Tides
- Origin: The Bronx, New York
- Genres: Doo-wop
- Years active: 1956–1965
- Labels: Acme; Recorte Records; Madison Records; Mr. Peacock Records; Mr. Peake Records
- Past members: Antonio Aiello; Vinnie Drago; Tony Delesio; Ralph Bracco; Tony Imbimbo; Anthony DiBari

Nino and the Ebb Tides were a doo-wop musical group based in the Bronx, New York, formed in 1956.

Their first recording, Franny Franny (credited to "The Ebb Tides"), was the result of meeting talent scout Murray Jacobs in 1957 and was widely played by Alan Freed. Later releases were on Jacobs' newly formed Recorte Records, before the group moved on to Madison Records.

One of their recordings that reached the charts, "Jukebox Saturday Night", was a cover of a Glenn Miller tune. On September 4, 1961, their "Juke Box Saturday Night" charted on Billboard's Top 100, reaching number 57.

The group was managed by Ralph Fusco, also from the Bronx, NY.
