= The Shells =

- Origin: Brooklyn, New York, United States
- Genres: Doo-wop
- Years active: 1957–1963
- Label: Johnson Records
- Past members: Nate Bouknight; Randy Shade Alston; Bobby Nurse; Danny Small; Gus Geter; Alphonse Merkman

The Shells were an American doo wop ensemble formed in Brooklyn, New York, United States, in 1957.

The group scored a US pop hit in 1957 with the song "Baby Oh Baby", released on Johnson Records; the song cracked the Top 30. Further singles passed with little success until 1960, when producers Donn Fileti and Wayne Stierle re-issued "Baby Oh Baby". The tune hit number 21 on the US Billboard Hot 100 upon re-release. The group issued several further singles, as well as a split LP with The Dubs in 1963.

== Members ==
- Nate Bouknight
- Randy Shade Alston
- Bobby Nurse
- Danny Small
- Gus Geter
- Alphonse Merkman

== Singles ==
Note:This list is incomplete

- "Angel Eyes" (1957) and (What's In An Angel's Eyes 1960)
- "Baby Oh Baby" (1957; re-released 1961)
- "Sippin' Soda" (1958)
- "She Wasn't Meant for Me" (1959)
- "Be Sure My Love" (1960)
- "So Fine" (1960)
- "Explain it to Me" (1961)
- "Happy Holiday (1962; with Ray Lamont Jones)
- "Deep in my Heart" (1962)
- "Will you Miss me When I'm Gone?" (date unknown)
- My Cherie (1957)
