= Dan Farber =

Israeli musician

Dan Farber דן פרבר
- Also known as: Metro
- Born: 23 January 1987 (age 39); Tel Aviv, Israel
- Genres: Hip hop; trap; pop; EDM; R&B
- Occupations: Record producer; songwriter; rapper
- Years active: 2004–present
- Labels: TACT; Dim Mak; Buygore; Atlantic

Dan Farber (Hebrew: דן פרבר; born 23 January 1987) is an Israeli record producer and songwriter. In the 2000s, he performed as a rapper under the stage name Metro (Hebrew: מטרו). His most notable collaborations include working with Subliminal, Lizzo, Dizzee Rascal, Sarit Hadad and Tkay Maidza.

== Early life ==
Farber was born in 1987 in Tel Aviv, Israel and raised in Los Angeles.

== Musical career ==
Farber began his musical career in the 2000s as a rapper, songwriter and record producer. In 2005 he signed a deal with Subliminal's TACT Family, producing albums released by the label, including Subliminal's Jew-Niversal and The Shadow's debut Lo Sam Zain, among others. In 2010, Farber released two singles that were supposed to be included on his debut album, "BeToch Bu'ah" and "Mishak Shel Dma'ot". The singles have not been successful and the album was shelved due to controversy with the record label.

In 2014 he released his debut EP, Middle Eastern Jungle, on Dim Mak Records. That year, Farber signed a record deal with Borgore's Buygore, releasing some singles by the label and co-writing Borgore's tracks. In 2015, he produced the debut album by Yael Borger, Borgore's sister.

In July 2017, Farber co-produced the sixth studio album by British rapper Dizzee Rascal Raskit, which reached the tenth place in the UK Albums Chart. That year, he signed a record deal with Atlantic Records.

In July 2019, Farber co-produced the gold record "Tempo", the second single from Lizzo's Grammy Award–winning studio album Cuz I Love You.

== Personal life ==
Farber lives in Los Angeles.

== Discography ==
=== Extended plays ===
- Middle Eastern Jungle (2014)
