= History of Irish Americans in Philadelphia =

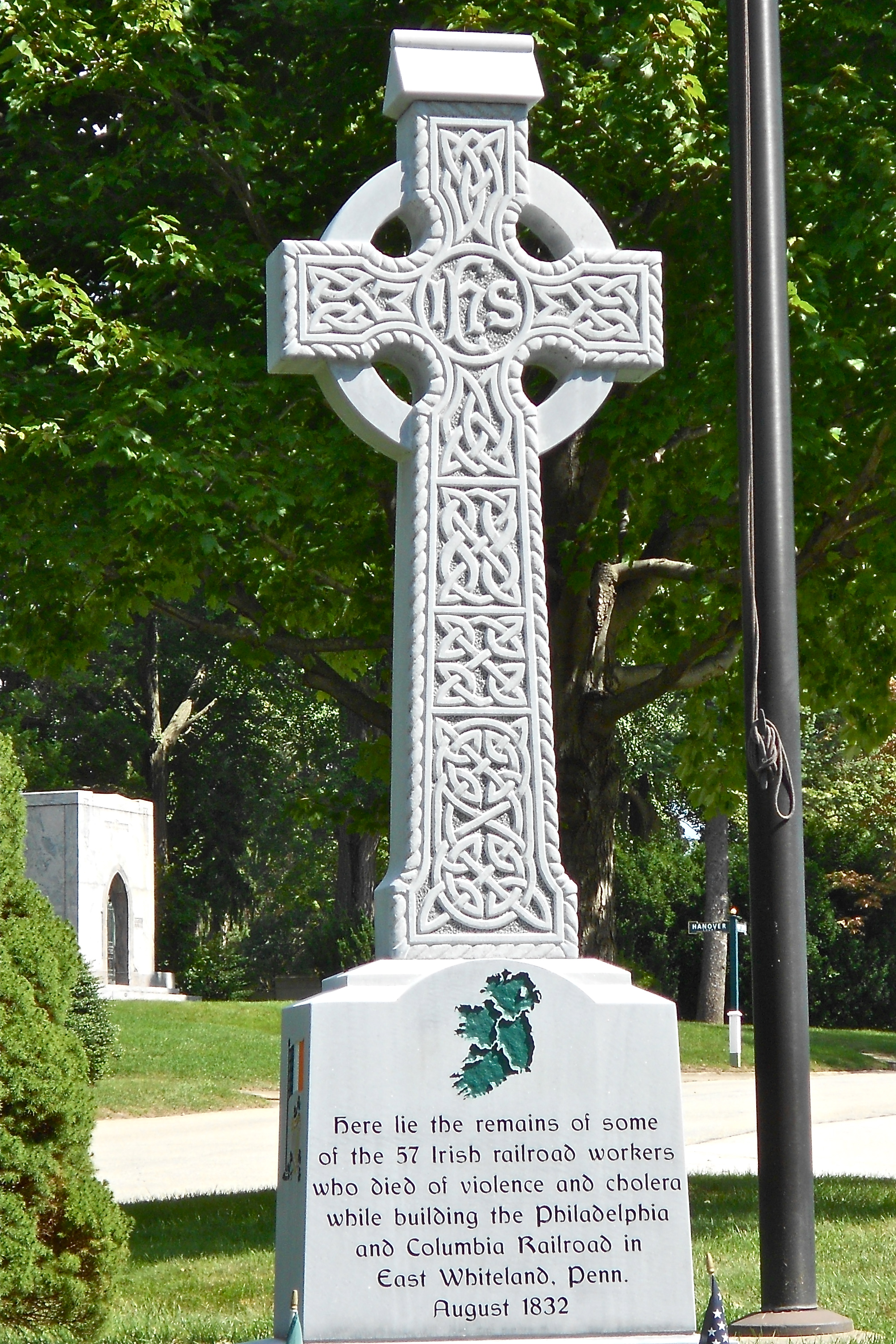
Grave of some of the 57 Irish victims of Duffy's Cut in West Laurel Hill Cemetery

People of Irish descent form the largest ethnic group in the city of Philadelphia and its surrounding counties. The Irish have lived in Philadelphia since the pre-American Revolution period. Irishmen had participated in pro-Revolutionary activities in Philadelphia during the Revolutionary War. Like many American cities in the 19th century, Philadelphia, which was once a Quaker stronghold, changed dramatically with the influx of European immigrants. The first major influx of Irish came in 1844 from rural areas, spurred by the Irish Famine. Because of the Quaker belief and pledge of religious tolerance, Irish Catholics and Protestants, among others, made the city incredibly diverse. Philadelphia at the time had a need for industrial labor, and at the time Philadelphia was becoming a major industrial center in the United States. Irish took industrial positions. In the 1840s and 1850s, anti-Catholic sentiment grew against the Irish, and eventually led up to riots, such as the Philadelphia nativist riots and the Lombard Street riot. Eventually the Irish gained financial and social status in the latter half of the 19th century and founded institutions during the period. Many Irish Philadelphians would later move on to other major Americans cities, such as Detroit, Milwaukee, Seattle, and St. Louis.

Philadelphia's Irish population have left their mark in a number of ways. Traditionally, the Philadelphia Police Department and Philadelphia Fire Department have always had a large Irish American influence. Many neighborhoods, such as Kensington and Fishtown of Northeast Philadelphia, and Pennsport of South Philadelphia are still heavily Irish. One of the most prominent Irish Philadelphians was Grace Kelly, an acclaimed actress who became Princess of Monaco. Prominent local politicians past and present, such as James Logan, would have an impact as well. The Irish were also responsible for establishing many Catholic institutions, such as St. Joseph's University, La Salle University, and Villanova University.

== History ==
=== Pre- and early America ===
The Irish had a major impact on the city even prior to its inception. William Penn, founder of Philadelphia and the Province of Pennsylvania, had notable ties to Ireland. Penn converted to Quakerism as a result of a sermon preached in Cork.

The Irish Catholics were a recognizable part in the city in the pre-Revolutionary War years. Philadelphia had a large presence of Irish bars and taverns, such as "Isabella Barry's Faithful Irishman", and "The Jolly Irishman". Patriotism became a well known characteristic of Irish in Philadelphia during the Revolution.

The Society of the Friendly Sons of St. Patrick was founded in 1771.

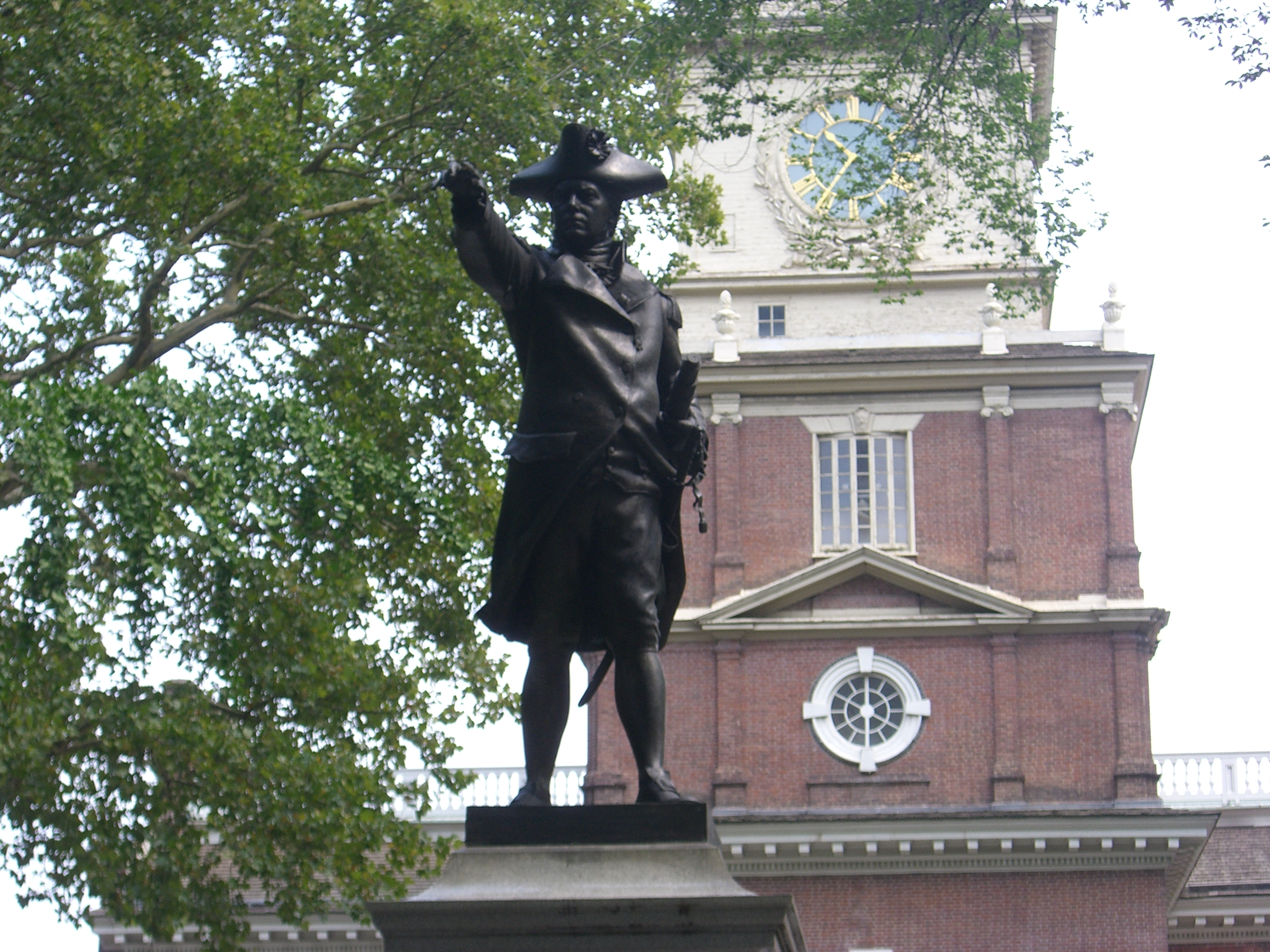
Commodore John Barry statue in front of Independence Hall

The first St. Patrick's Day parade in Philadelphia was in 1771. Prior to the first parade, the Irish were already celebrating St. Patrick's Day in Philadelphia. Before the American republic was founded, Irishmen came together in 1771 to pay honor to Ireland's patron as founding members of the Society of the Friendly Sons of St. Patrick for the relief of Emigrants from Ireland. George Washington, who has encouraged the many Irish soldiers under his command during the American Revolution to fete St. Patrick's Day, was an honorary member of this society. The designation of March 17 as a day of special observance was a very early Philadelphia custom. Philadelphia's Saint Patrick's Day parade is the second oldest in the United States.

Many Irish fought in the Battle of White Marsh during the Philadelphia campaign in the Revolutionary War. Perhaps no Irishman would have a bigger impact during the Revolutionary War than John Barry. He came to be widely credited as "The Father of the American Navy" (and shares that moniker with John Paul Jones) and was appointed a captain in the Continental Navy on December 7, 1775. He was the first captain placed in command of a US warship commissioned for service under the Continental flag. After the war, he became America's first commissioned naval officer, at the rank of commodore, receiving his commission from President George Washington in 1797.

=== 19th century ===
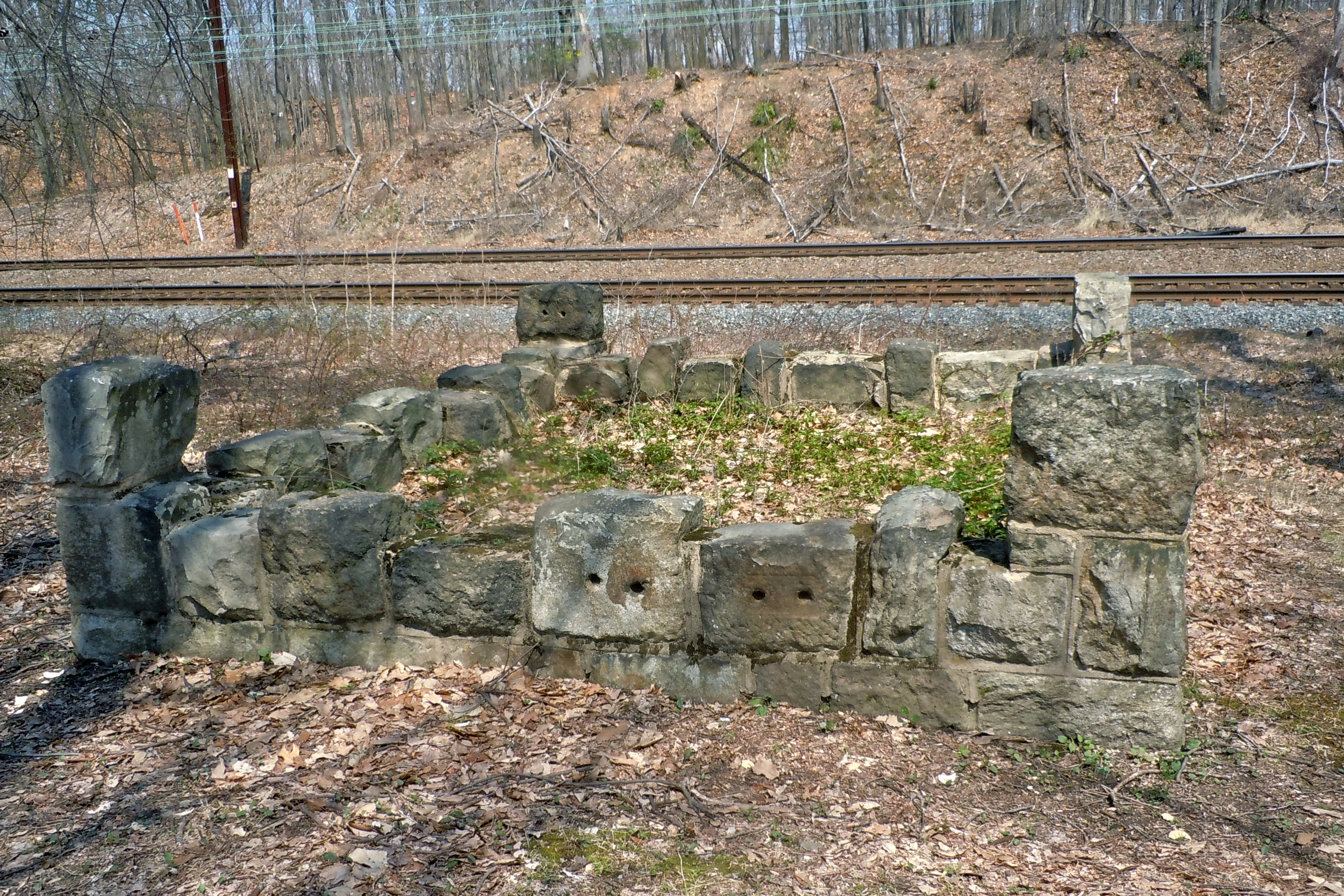
Enclosure at Duffy's Cut where the majority of the remains are believed to rest, possibly after having been moved.

Several Irish associations were formed in the 19th century. The first mutual aid groups to support individual counties were those for County Donegal and County Mayo, and others were subsequently formed. The Total Abstinence Brotherhood was founded to promote Catholic-based morality and an abstinence from alcohol. The Clan na Gael and the Fenian Brotherhood were formed to support Ireland-based nationalist groups. Some groups had Philadelphia-based chapters with their own meeting halls. They included the Ancient Order of the Hibernians, The Irish Catholic Benevolent Union, and the Irish League.

==== Duffy's Cut ====
Duffy's Cut is the name given to a stretch of railroad tracks about 30 miles west of Philadelphia, originally built for the Philadelphia and Columbia Railroad in the summer and fall of 1832. The line later became part of the Pennsylvania Railroad's Main Line. Railroad contractor Philip Duffy hired 57 Irish immigrants to lay this line through the area's densely wooded hills and ravines. The workers came to Philadelphia from the Ulster counties of Donegal, Tyrone and Londonderry to work in Pennsylvania's nascent railroad industry. Less than two months after their arrival, all 57 died during the second cholera pandemic. While most died of the disease, forensic evidence suggests that some may have been murdered, perhaps due to fear of contagion, as the pandemic spanned several continents and many years.

The site is located near Malvern, Pennsylvania, in East Whiteland Township near the intersection of King Road and Sugartown Road, where a Pennsylvania state historical marker has been placed.

==== The famine generation ====
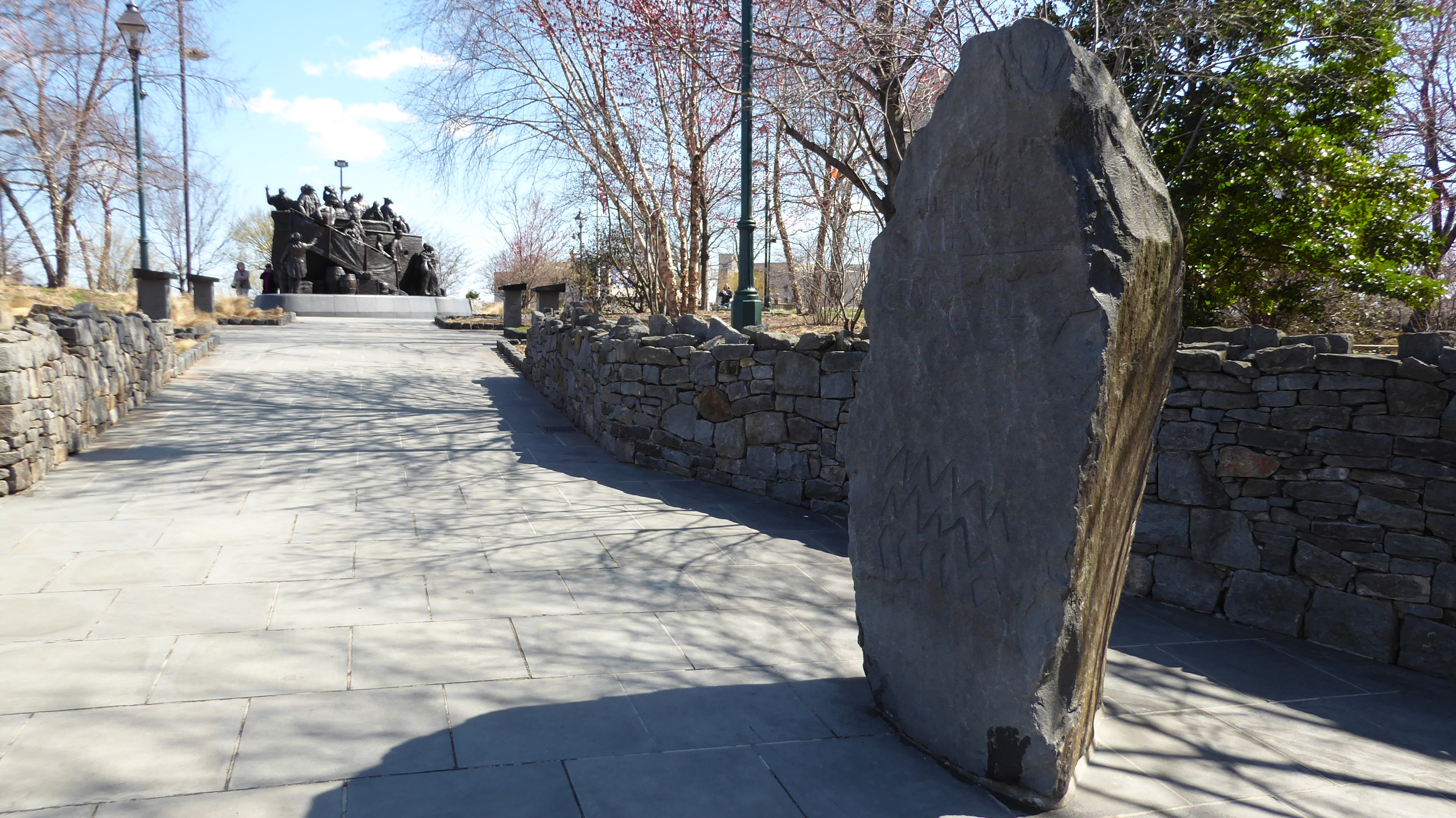
"Leacht Cuimhneacháin na nGael", Irish famine memorial located in Philadelphia.

By 1846, Philadelphia had received Irish immigrants for six generations, but it was the seventh generation that was to greatly change the city's composition and posture with respect to immigrants. The increase of Irish immigrants in the post-famine years introduced a ghetto system. During the famine, the Society of Friends in Philadelphia distinguished itself by its dedication to the relief of the suffering in Ireland. The Philadelphia Society of Friends Famine Relief Committee took charge of soliciting donations from Quakers across the United States and forwarding them to Ireland. Although Quaker families had found hospitality and refuge in Ireland in the seventeenth century, they also found hostility. It is a mark of the high principles of these families that many of the descendants of the earlier Quaker emigrants contributed heavily in the 1840s to the Irish.

==== Nativist and Lombard street riots ====
The Lombard Street riot was a three-day race riot in 1842. The riot was the last in a 13-year period marked by frequent racial attacks in the city. It started on Lombard Street, between Fifth and Eighth streets. During the years immediately before the riots, there were periodic outbreaks of racial, ethnic and religious violence among Irish Catholics, German Protestants, African Americans and even pacifist Quakers. These were the result of social and economic competition, especially between Irish Catholics and African Americans, who were generally at the bottom of the social hierarchy. Many Irish refused to work on labor teams with African Americans.

Irish Catholics, often competitors for the lowest-paying, unskilled and menial jobs, perceived the city's more successful African-American residents as flaunting their success, setting the stage for blacks to become targets for the immigrants' frustrations and jealous rage.

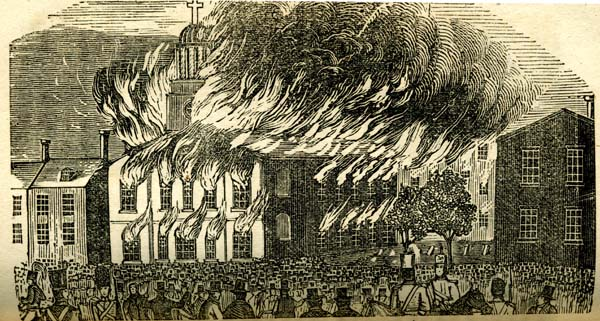
St. Augustine's Church on fire during the Nativist Riots

On the morning of August 1, 1842, a parade was held by over 1,000 members of the black Young Men's Vigilant Association on Philadelphia's Lombard Street between Fifth and Eighth Streets in commemoration of the eighth anniversary of the end of slavery in the British West Indies. As the paraders neared Mother Bethel Church, they were attacked by an Irish Catholic mob. The rioters moved west, setting fires and attacking firefighters and police as they went, heading for the home of African-American leader Robert Purvis. Purvis and his home were reportedly saved from the Irish mob solely by a Catholic priest's intervention.

Requests to the mayor and police for protection initially led to the arrest of several of the victims and none of the rioters. Over three days of attacks, the Second African American Presbyterian Church (on St. Mary's Street near 6th Street), the abolitionist Smith's Hall, and numerous homes and public buildings were looted, burned and mostly destroyed. The mayor had credible evidence of a plan to burn several local churches, which he ignored. Eventually, as the rioting began to subside, the local militia was brought in to restore order.

The Philadelphia Nativist Riots were a series of riots that took place between May 6 and 8 and July 6 and 7, 1844, in the districts of Kensington and Southwark. The riots were a result of rising anti-Catholic sentiment at the growing population of Irish Catholic immigrants. In the five months prior to the riots, nativist groups had been spreading a rumor that Catholics were trying to remove the Bible from public schools. A nativist rally in Kensington erupted in violence on May 6 and started a deadly riot that would result in the destruction of two Catholic churches and numerous other buildings. Riots erupted again in July, after it was discovered that St. Philip Neri's Catholic Church in Southwark had armed itself for protection. Fierce fighting broke out between the nativists and the soldiers sent to protect the church, resulting in numerous deaths and injuries. Several Catholic churches were burned. Nationally, the riots helped fuel criticism of the nativist movement, despite denials from nativist groups of responsibility. The riots made deficiencies in law enforcement in Philadelphia and the surrounding districts readily apparent, influencing various reforms in local police departments and the eventual consolidation of the city in 1854.

=== 20th century ===
During the 20th century the Irish Center/Commodore Barry Club and the Irish American Club raised funds for Irish-related causes through meetings.

==== The Kelly family ====
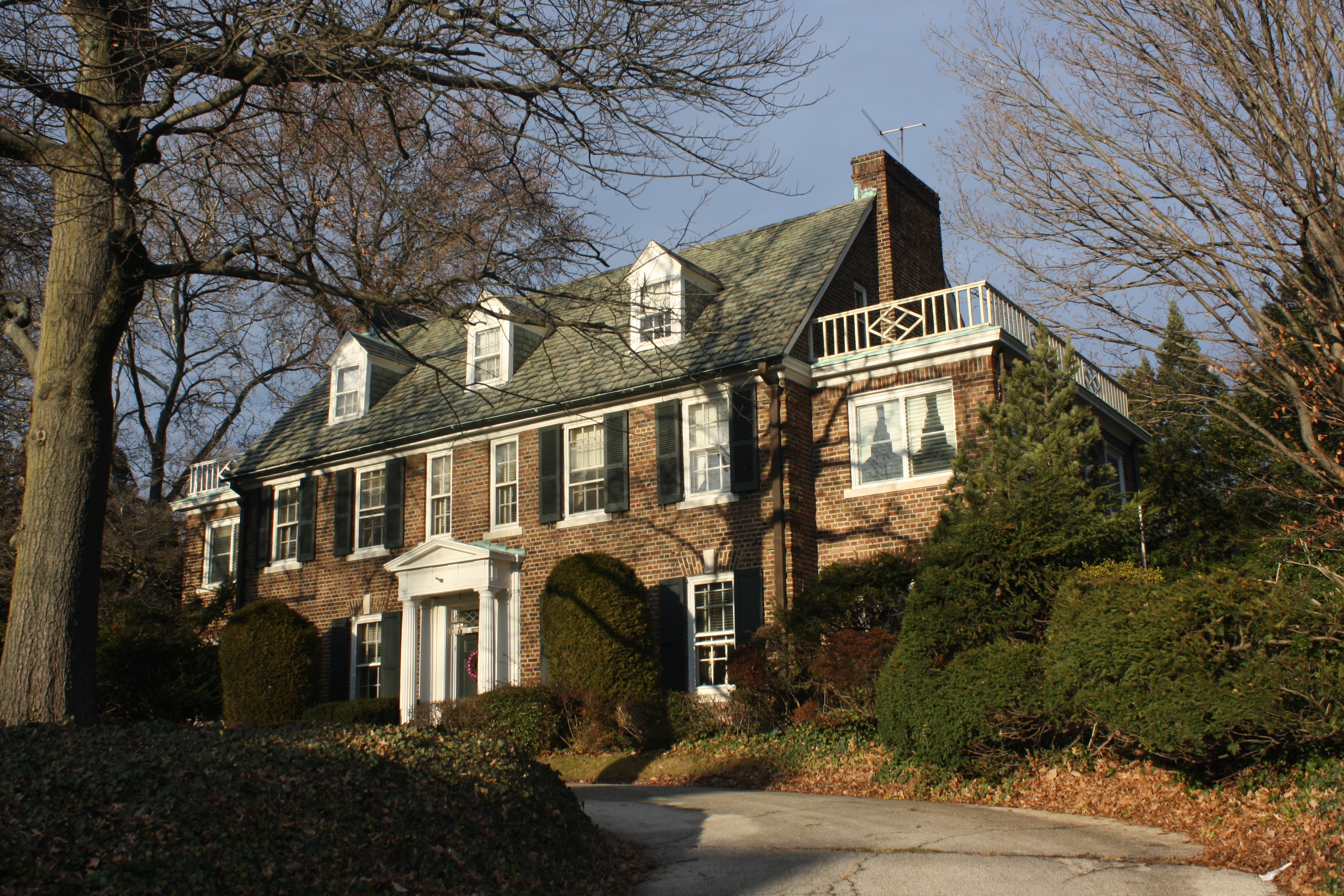
The Kelly family home built by Jack Kelly Sr. in 1929, in the East Falls section of Philadelphia

It was during the 20th century that Philadelphia's most prominent Irish family would gain notice. Jack Kelly Sr. (1889–1960), had won three Olympic gold medals for sculling and owned a successful brickwork contracting company that was well known on the East Coast. A registered Democrat, he was nominated to be mayor of Philadelphia for the 1935 election but lost by the closest margin in the city's history. In later years, he served on the Fairmount Park Commission and, during World War II, was appointed by President Roosevelt as National Director of Physical Fitness. Two of his brothers were also notable: Walter C. Kelly (1873–1939) was a vaudeville star who also made films for Metro-Goldwyn-Mayer and Paramount Pictures, and George Kelly (1887–1974) was a Pulitzer Prize-winning dramatist, screenwriter, and director.

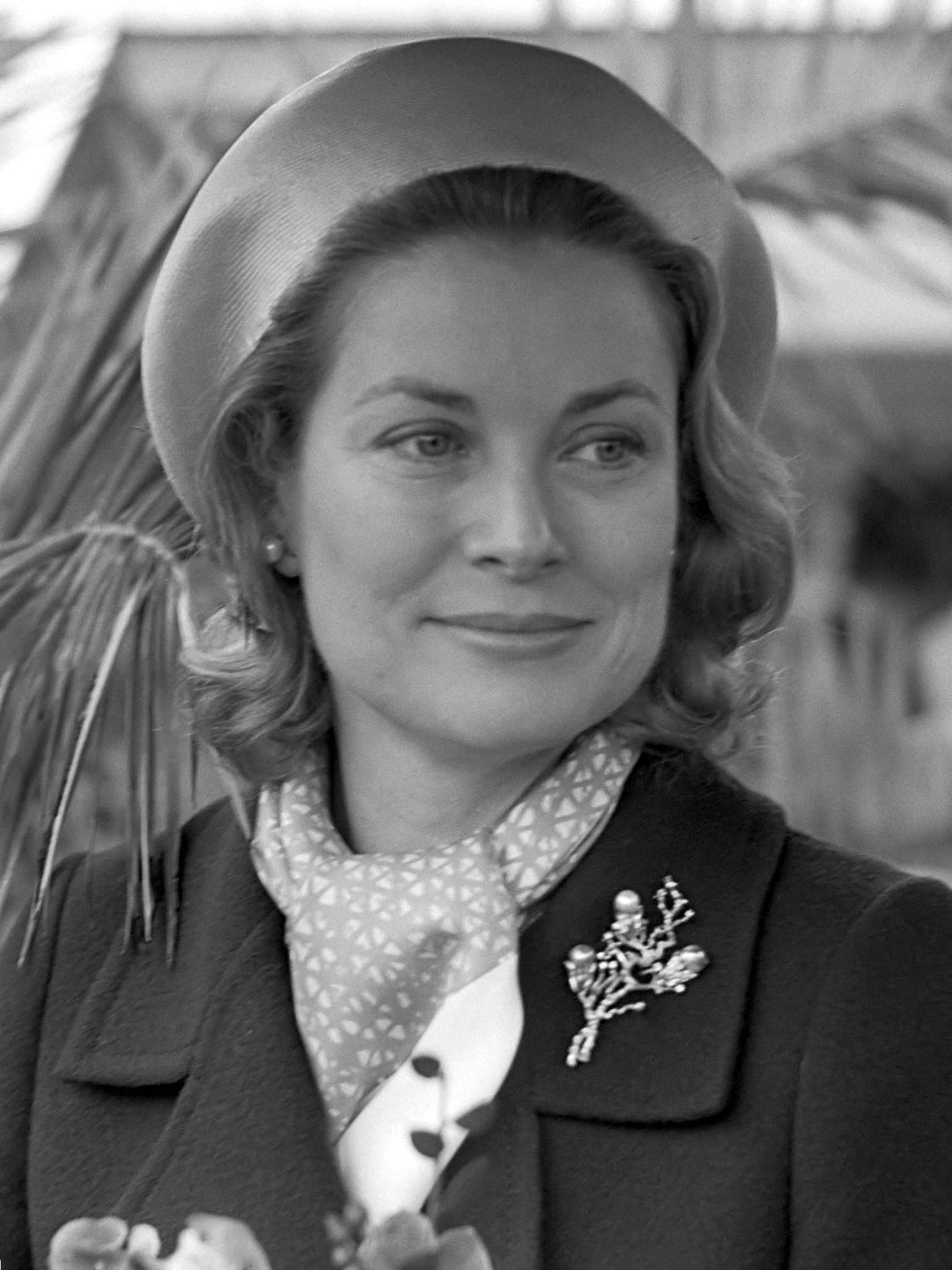
"Princess Grace of Monaco"

The most well known Kelly family member was Grace Kelly. Grace Kelly was born on November 12, 1929, at Hahnemann University Hospital in Philadelphia. She had two older siblings, Margaret (1925–1991) and Jack Jr. (1927–1985), and a younger sister, Elizabeth (1933–2009). The children were raised in the Roman Catholic faith. After embarking on an acting career in 1950, at age 20, Kelly appeared in New York City theatrical productions and more than 40 episodes of live drama productions broadcast during the early 1950s Golden Age of Television. In October 1953, she gained stardom from her performance in the film Mogambo, which won her a Golden Globe Award and an Academy Award nomination in 1954. Subsequently, she had leading roles in five films, including The Country Girl (1954), for which her deglamorized performance earned her an Academy Award for Best Actress. Other films include High Noon (1952) with Gary Cooper, Dial M for Murder (1954) with Ray Milland, Rear Window (1954) with James Stewart, To Catch a Thief (1955) with Cary Grant, and High Society (1956) with Frank Sinatra and Bing Crosby.

Kelly retired from acting at the age of 26 to marry Rainier III and began her duties as Princess of Monaco. They had three children: Caroline, Albert II, and Stéphanie. Kelly retained her American roots, maintaining dual U.S. and Monégasque citizenship. She died on September 14, 1982, a day after suffering a stroke while driving her car, which caused a crash.

Despite the Irish having a huge influence to the city and area, it wouldn't be until 1962 that Philadelphia would have its first Irish Catholic mayor. James Tate was Mayor of Philadelphia from 1962 to 1972.

Perhaps the most well-known Irish mayor the city ever had was William J. Green III. As mayor, Green was often forced by circumstances to make difficult and unpopular choices. He was required to balance a city budget still at a record high $285 million deficit inherited from Mayor Rizzo, the largest ever inherited by an incoming Philadelphia mayor. The resulting disputes with municipal labor unions, open battles with City Council, quiet disputes with campaign contributors, and an adversarial relationship with the mass media sapped his morale. "Reporters are the type of people who tore the wings off flies when they were young," he complained at the time. His efforts to balance the budget were successful, however, and for the first time in years new businesses were choosing to relocate to Philadelphia, which won a national marketing award during the Green administration. In a city divided by race, Green appointed the first African American managing director, future Mayor Wilson Goode, aggressively supported Joseph Coleman as the first African American president of City Council, and appointed the first African American superintendent of the Philadelphia public schools, Constance Clayton. Another member of his cabinet was the city's first female city solicitor. The Green administration is also remembered for having brought young talent into the City government: Chaka Fattah received his first government job in Green's Commerce Department, one headed by Dick Doran; Ed Deseve, Green's finance director, went on to head the U.S. Office of Management and the Budget in the administration of President Bill Clinton; Bill Marrazo, a Green commissioner of the Philadelphia Water Department, is now president of WHYY, Philadelphia's principal public television station.

Green decided not to seek re-election during the Democratic primary and concentrated on his family when his wife Patricia became pregnant. Pat Green was 40 and Green feared for her health and the health of his unborn child if she faced the stress of a political campaign during the pregnancy. After his youngest child, Maura Elizabeth Green, was born healthy near the end of his term, Green joked, "I am the winner" of the 1983 mayoral contest.

=== 21st century ===
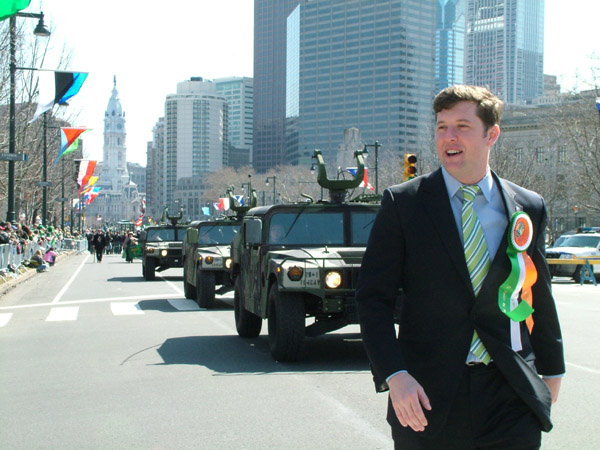
Then Congressman Patrick Murphy walking in the 2007 Philadelphia St. Patrick's Day Parade

Due to the change in demographics in the city, the Irish are no longer a dominant ethnicity. These events have brought changes to some of the cities neighborhoods that were predominantly known as Irish neighborhoods, such as Fishtown. However, the Irish still have a lasting impact in the city. In 2015, Philadelphia elected Irish American Jim Kenney as the 99th mayor of the city. Several current local politicians of Irish descent include Pat Meehan, Brendan Boyle, currently a member of the US House of Representatives for Pennsylvania's Second District, Mike Stack, who was formerly the 33rd Lieutenant Governor of Pennsylvania, and Patrick Murphy, formerly the Secretary of the Army.

== Culture ==
=== Media ===
18 Irish newspapers had been established since the 1800s. The Roman Catholic Archdiocese of Philadelphia newspaper, the Catholic Standard and Times, has covered news related to Irish affairs. It was founded in 1866.

Irish radio broadcasts appeared during the 20th century. From March 17, 1926, the Irish Hour by Patrick Stanton operated over the radio airwaves, playing Irish music and news broadcasts. Stanton later acquired WJMJ, which played Irish music.

=== Arts and entertainment ===
A Philadelphia tradition since the early twentieth century, the Mummers Parade is held each New Year's Day in Philadelphia, Pennsylvania. It is believed to be the oldest folk festival in the United States. Numerous Irish immigrants and Irish-Americans from South Philadelphia became involved in the Mummers Parade as both Mummers performers and parade goers.

Several Irish themed bands have emerged from the area. The Green Fields of America is an ensemble which performs and promotes Irish traditional music in the United States.

"The Green Fields of America" was formed in 1978 in Philadelphia and still led by musician and folklorist Mick Moloney. The band was created to present and tour some of Irish America's finest musicians and dancers. "The Green Fields of America" was the first group on either side of the Atlantic to bring together Irish vocal, instrumental, and dance traditions on the concert and festival stage. Featuring Irish stepdance they introduced their sound to general American audiences.

The television series "It's Always Sunny in Philadelphia" is perhaps the most well known Philadelphia entertainment with an Irish theme. The series follows the exploits of "The Gang", a group of self-centered friends who run the Irish bar Paddy's Pub in South Philadelphia.

=== Cuisine ===
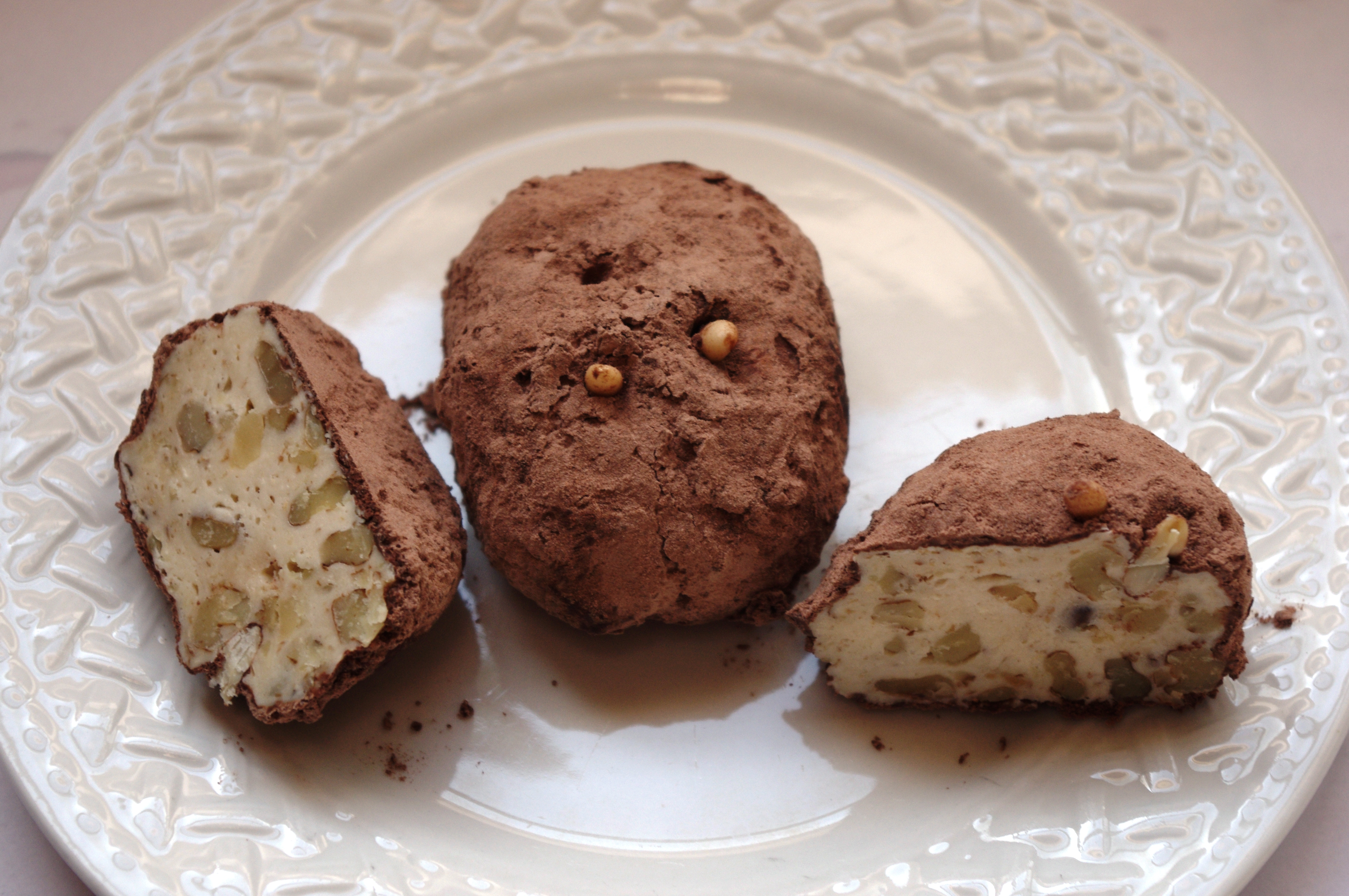
Irish potato candy, popular around St. Patrick's Day

Irish potato candy is a traditional Philadelphia confection that, despite its name, is not from Ireland, and does not usually contain any potato. The candies have a coconut cream inside (generally made from some blend of coconut, confectioner's sugar, vanilla, and cream or cream cheese) and are rolled in cinnamon on the outside, resulting in an appearance reminiscent of small potatoes. The treats are about the size of a large marble and are especially popular around St. Patrick's Day.

Oh Ryan's of Boothwyn, Pennsylvania, claims to be the largest distributor of Irish Potatoes, shipping about 80,000 pounds to major chains and smaller candy stores, mostly in the Philadelphia area. See's Candies, based in South San Francisco, also makes a version composed of a divinity and English walnut interior dusted with cocoa and using pine nuts as potato "eyes." The potatoes are showcased as a seasonal product by Philadelphia-area supermarkets, such as Acme Markets.

=== Sports ===
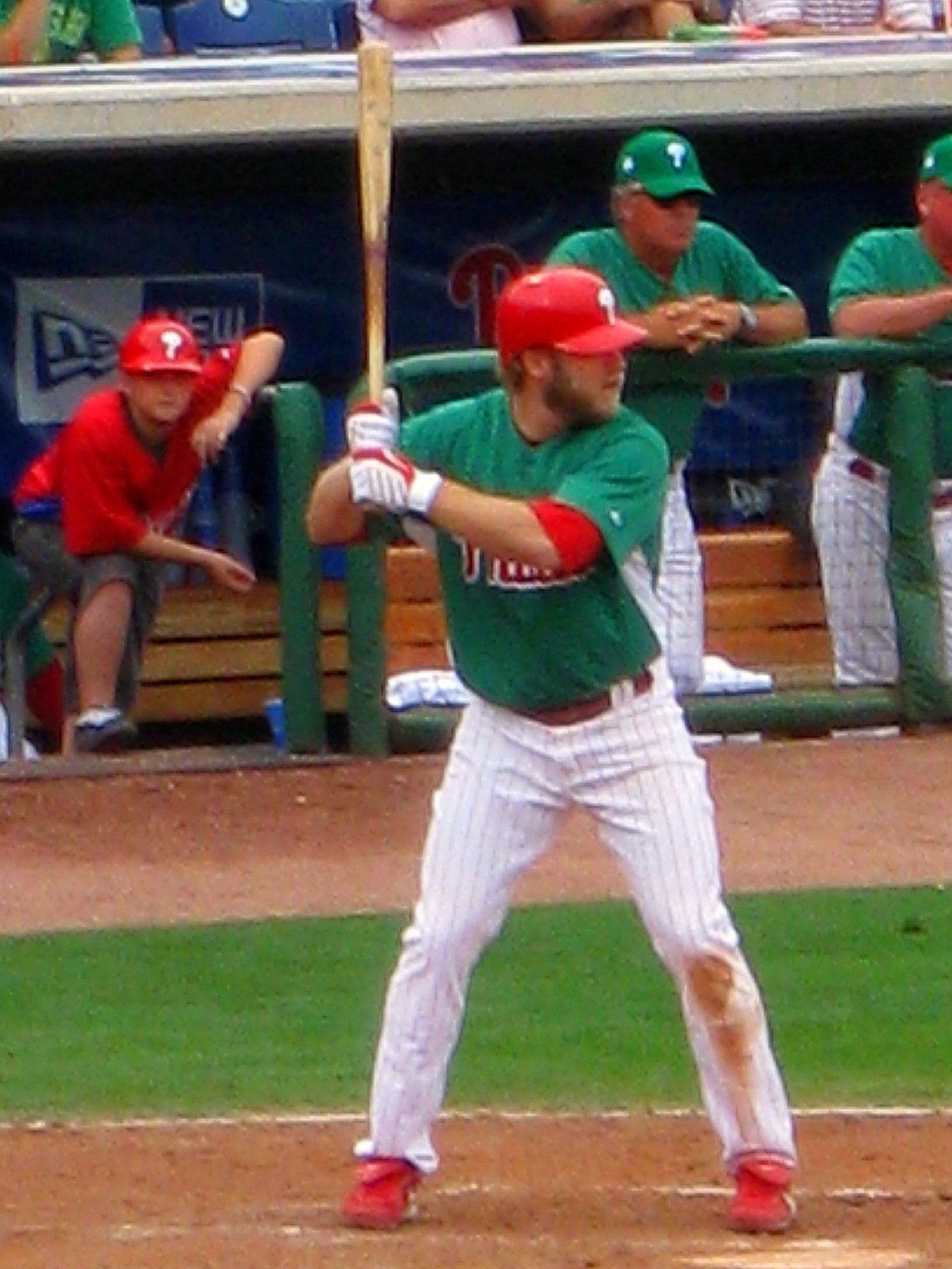
The Phillies started the tradition of wearing green uniforms on St. Patrick's day.

The Philadelphia Phillies always play at home during spring training on St. Patrick's Day. The Phillies hold the distinction of being the first baseball team to wear green uniforms on St. Patricks Day. The tradition was started by Phillies pitcher Tug McGraw, who dyed his uniform green the night before March 17, 1981.

Rugby is a popular sport within the Philadelphia Irish community. The Philadelphia Whitemarsh RFC, a rugby union team, was founded in 1985, the Philadelphia Fight, a semi-professional rugby league football team, was founded in 1998, and the Northeast Philadelphia Irish, a team within the Eastern Pennsylvania Rugby Union, was founded in 2011 and has both men and women clubs.

Numerous colleges in the area offer club rugby teams, with most area teams competing as part of the Eastern Pennsylvania Rugby Union. The Collegiate Rugby Championship (CRC), is a college rugby sevens tournament held every June at Talen Energy Stadium near Philadelphia. The CRC is the highest profile college rugby competition in the United States, with the tournament broadcast live on NBC every year. The Collegiate Rugby Championship has succeeded in drawing media attention, corporate sponsorships and attendance. Philadelphia also takes part in hurling, camogie, and Gaelic football. These sports are within the Philadelphia Division GAA Board, which is affiliated to the North American Board.

== Crime ==
The prominent Irish street gang pre-twentieth century were the Schuylkill Rangers headed by Jimmy Haggerty, whose boyhood home was located on Arch Street in the area between Eighteenth and Nineteenth Street known as "McAran's Garden".

After numerous arrests for theft and similar offenses, Haggerty and Schuylkill Ranger Hugh Murphy were convicted of the robbery of a Ninth Street store and sentenced to ten years imprisonment on December 12, 1865. He was pardoned by Governor Andrew G. Curtin eight months later, in part to Haggerty's political connections and his promise to leave the country upon his release, and lived in Canada for a brief time before returning to the city to resume his criminal career. Haggerty remained a major underworld figure in Philadelphia until January 1869 when he was arrested on several counts of assault with intent to kill; during his arrest, he shot the arresting police officer. He was caught trying to escape from prison but was later released on bail and fled the city. Staying in New York for a brief time, he returned to Philadelphia in April to surrender himself to authorities after the wounded police officer had received "hush money". He won both court cases against him, but was ordered at the second trial to return to the Eastern State Penitentiary by the District Attorney for violating the terms of his release. While his lawyers argued the ruling, Haggerty disappeared from the courthouse during a recess in what was suspected to have been a planned escape.

During prohibition, Daniel "Danny" O'Leary fought with Maxie Hoff over control of Philadelphia's bootlegging throughout Prohibition. Jack "Legs" Diamond was a prominent mobster in both Philadelphia and New York City.

In the years following World War II, the K&A Gang was the dominant Irish gang in the city's underworld. A multi-generational organized crime group made up of predominantly Irish and Irish American gangsters, the gang originated from a youth street gang based around the intersections of Kensington and Allegheny, which grew in power as local hoods and blue collar Irish Americans seeking extra income joined its ranks. In time, the group expanded and grew more organised, establishing lucrative markets in gambling, loan sharking, and burglary.

The gang moved into the methamphetamine trade in the late 1980s and expanded into the Fishtown and Port Richmond neighbourhoods. John Berkery, a member of the K&A burglary crew, became leader of the gang, and was influential in expanding the drug trade. In 1987, Scarfo crime family soldier Raymond Martorano, Berkery, and dozens of others, were indicted for their involvement in a large methamphetamine ring.

== Demographics ==
Philadelphia has a high percentage of Irish Americans, making up 14.2% of the population. Due to the change of the city's demographics, most of Philadelphia's Irish population are now in the suburbs. Many surrounding towns have large Irish populations, such as Crum Lynne, Pennsylvania (39.2% Irish), Drexel Hill, Pennsylvania (37.9% Irish), and Gloucester City, New Jersey (38.8% Irish). Havertown, Pennsylvania (21.7% Irish) is often known as the "33rd county," a reference to the 32 counties of Ireland.

== Notable individuals ==
- Kevin Bacon, actor, musician
- Samuel Barber, composer
- Brendan F. Boyle, politician
- Kevin J. Boyle, politician
- Peter Boyle, actor
- John Barry, Revolutionary War naval officer, "The Father of the American Navy"
- Ethel Barrymore, actress, "First Lady of the American Theater"
- John Barrymore, actor
- Lionel Barrymore, actor, director
- Georgiana Drew Barrymore, actress
- Bob Brady, politician, Chairman of the Democratic Party of Philadelphia
- Samuel Brady, Irish colonial Indian fighter
- Joseph Breen, film censor, applied Hays Code
- Samuel Brady Irish American frontiersman
- Gia Carangi, Often considered to be the world's first supermodel, one of the first famous women to die of AIDS
- Mathew Carey, publisher, economist
- Imogene Coca, actress, comedian
- Bradley Cooper, actor, producer
- Kim Delaney, Emmy Award-winning actress
- Jack "Legs" Diamond, gangster
- Johnny Dougherty, prominent labor leader
- John Drew Jr., stage actor
- Michael (Mike) Driscoll, Philadelphia City Council Member, businessman and founder of the iconic Irish Pub, "Finnigan's Wake" in Philadelphia
- Daniel Faulkner, Philadelphia police officer.
- Kate Flannery, actress
- Franklin B. Gowen, President of Philadelphia and Reading Railroad
- John Joseph Graham, Auxiliary bishop, Archdiocese of Philadelphia
- William J. Green Jr., politician
- William J. Green III, 94th mayor
- Jimmy Haggerty, gangster
- Alexander Haig, Army general, 59th Secretary of State
- William Harnett, painter
- Edward "Babe" Heffron, soldier, "Band of Brothers"
- Bobby Henon, politician
- Edward Hughes, bishop, Metuchen, New Jersey
- William F. Keller, politician
- Dorothy Kelly, actress
- George Kelly, playwright, screenwriter, director, and actor
- Grace Kelly, actress, Princess of Monaco
- Jack Kelly Jr., four-time Olympian rower
- Jack Kelly Sr., triple Olympic gold medal winner, patriarch of Kelly family
- Walt Kelly, animator, cartoonist
- Jamie Kennedy, actor, comedian
- Jim Kenney, 99th mayor
- James V. Lafferty, inventor, Lucy the Elephant
- James Logan, 14th mayor, statesman
- Jeanette MacDonald, actress, singer of musicals
- Chris Matthews, political commentator, talk show host, and author
- Seamus McCaffery, Philadelphia police officer, Justice of Supreme Court of Pennsylvania, "Eagles Court"
- John McDermott, professional golfer, U.S. Open champion
- Maje McDonnell, baseball coach, scout, official with the Philadelphia Phillies
- Brian McDonough, Television and Radio personality, author, physician, dual citizen of Ireland and United States
- Joseph McGarrity, founder, Society of the Friendly Sons of Saint Patrick for the Relief of Emigrants
- Mike McGeary, baseball player
- Kathleen McGinty, Chair of the Council on Environmental Quality
- Rob McElhenney, actor, comedian, creator of It's Always Sunny in Philadelphia
- Joseph P. McFadden, auxiliary bishop, Archdiocese of Philadelphia, Bishop of Harrisburg
- Henry Plumer McIlhenny, chairman of the Philadelphia Museum of Art
- Jim McKay, television sports journalist, reported on the Munich massacre at the 1972 Summer Olympics
- Joseph McKenna, 42nd United States Attorney General
- Benny McLaughlin, 1948 Olympic soccer player
- James McNulty (Irish activist), commandant of the Doe Battalion, 1916 Easter Rising
- Chris Mooney, basketball coach, University of Richmond
- Alecia Beth "Pink" Moore, singer, songwriter, dancer, actress
- St. Clair Augustine Mulholland, American Civil War colonel, Medal of Honor recipient
- Patrick Murphy, politician, Secretary of the Army
- Jim Murray, co-founder of the Ronald McDonald House, General Manager of the Eagles
- Philadelphia Jack O'Brien, world light heavyweight boxing champion
- Fran O'Hanlon, basketball coach, Lafayette College
- Danny O'Leary, gangster, bootlegger
- Danny Rapp, singer, frontman of "Danny & the Juniors"
- Ed Reavy, fiddler and composer
- Frank Sheeran, gangster, labor union official
- Michael J. Stack, politician
- Mike Stack (III), 33rd Lieutenant Governor of Pennsylvania
- James Tate, 92nd mayor, first Irish Catholic mayor
- Charles Thomson, secretary of the Continental Congress, Revolutionary War
- Brian Tierney, publisher of The Philadelphia Inquirer
- William Wrigley Jr., chewing gum industrialist, founder and eponym of the Wm. Wrigley Jr. Company
- John Russell Young, seventh Librarian of the United States Congress
- Sean Tobin , Television Reporter

== See also ==
- Irish Americans
- Demographics of Philadelphia
- Northeast Philadelphia
- History of the Irish in Baltimore
- History of Irish Americans in Boston
- Irish Americans in New York City
- Irish Americans in the American Civil War
- Friendly Sons of St. Patrick
- Green Fields of America
- Acme Markets
