= Martorano =

Martorano is a surname. Notable people with the surname include:

- Egídio Martorano (1932–2022), Brazilian politician
- George Martorano (born 1950), American convicted criminal
- James Martorano (born 1941), American mobster
- Johnny Martorano (born 1940), American hitman
- Paulo Martorano (born 1933), American footballer
- Raymond Martorano (1927–2002), Italian–American mobster
