= Collectables Records =

American reissue record label

- Founded: 1980
- Founder: Jerry Greene; Nina Greene
- Genre: Doo-wop, rockabilly, rock and roll, pop, rock, country music, blues, funk
- Country of origin: U.S.
- Location: West Conshohocken, Pennsylvania
- Official website: www.oldies.com

Collectables Records is an American reissue record label, founded in 1980 by Jerry Greene. Greene also formed the Lost Nite and Crimson record labels.

== History ==
It maintains a catalogue of over 3,400 active titles on compact disc, with thousands of additional titles available on vinyl. It has released hundreds of recordings from the vaults of major labels, such as Columbia, Atlantic, RCA Victor, Capitol, Vee-Jay and others, making many available on CD for the first time. Genres found on Collectables include doo-wop, rockabilly, rock and roll, pop, rock, funk, jazz, comedy, and blues. Collectables Records released recordings by Johnny "Guitar" Watson, the Cleftones, and other doo wop albums.

Collectables Records publishes the 'Priceless Collection' series of budget compilations. Many of the label's other releases combine the contents of two original LPs on a single CD. The company also manufactures multi-CD compilation box sets sold exclusively through retailers such as QVC, Costco and Sam's Club.

Collectables is one of a group of companies, including Alpha Video, Gotham Distributing Corporation and the e-commerce website OLDIES.com, owned and operated by Jerry Greene and the Greene family.

== Quality of sound ==
Early LPs and CDs were often dubbed from scratchy records. Both Sides Now publisher Mike Callahan (in his book of CD reviews Oldies on CD), regularly gave early Collectables' CDs low scores based on sound quality. Over the years, the sound quality has improved greatly on Collectables' releases. Beginning in the mid-1990s, Little Walter DeVenne remastered many of the label's reissues, and the company has also made extensive use of the in-house mastering and restoration services of the major labels from whom they license material.

== Artists ==
The following artists have had at least one recording re-issued on Collectables Records.

- 1910 Fruitgum Company
- Gregory Abbott
- Barbara Acklin
- Roy Acuff
- Faye Adams
- Johnny Adams
- Cannonball Adderley
- The Addrisi Brothers
- The Ad Libs
- Jewel Akens
- Al B. Sure!
- The Alan Parsons Project
- Lee Allen
- Mose Allison
- The Allman Brothers Band
- America
- The Ames Brothers
- Ed Ames
- Ernestine Anderson
- Lee Andrews & The Hearts
- La Vern Baker
- The Beach Boys
- Chuck Berry
- Blues Magoos
- Brass Construction
- Brotherhood of Man
- Dave Brubeck
- Anita Bryant
- B.T. Express
- The Buckinghams
- The Capris
- Ray Conniff
- The Capitols
- Bruce Channel
- The Channels
- Chubby Checker
- The Checkmates
- Don Cherry
- Dee Clark
- The Classics
- The Cleftones
- Perry Como
- Ray Conniff
- The Crests
- The Cyrkle
- The Danleers
- Doris Day
- Jimmy Dean
- The Dell Vikings
- Devo
- Dion
- Dion and the Belmonts
- Ronnie Dove
- The Drifters
- Sheena Easton
- The Edsels
- Ray Ellis
- Emerson, Lake & Palmer
- The Emotions
- Preston Epps
- The Fabulaires
- Percy Faith
- Fancy
- Eddie Fisher
- The 5th Dimension
- The 5 Royales
- The Five Satins
- John Fred & His Playboy Band
- Stan Freberg
- Larry Graham
- The Harptones
- The Hi-Lo's
- Lena Horne
- Billy Idol
- The Islanders
- Burl Ives
- J.J. Jackson
- Wanda Jackson
- Harry James
- The Jive Five
- Johnny Maestro & the Brooklyn Bridge
- Buddy Knox
- Andre Kostelanetz
- Mark Lindsay
- Little Joe Blue
- The Mandrake Memorial
- The Marcels
- Johnny Mathis
- Gene McDaniels
- Lou Monte
- The Nutmegs
- The Outcasts (Manhasset, New York, U.S.)
- The Outcasts (Texas, U.S.)
- Carl Perkins
- Dan Pickett
- Elvis Presley
- ? and the Mysterians
- The Raindrops
- Randy & the Rainbows
- Eddie Rambeau
- Genya Ravan
- The Ravens
- Lou Rawls
- Johnnie Ray
- Red Crayola
- Jim Reeves
- Johnny Rivers
- Kenny Rogers
- The Royal Guardsmen
- Joey Scarbury
- Marlena Shaw
- The Shells
- Dinah Shore
- Bobby Short
- The Silhouettes
- Ginny Simms
- Joe Simon
- Warren Smith
- The Spaniels
- Benny Spellman
- Crispian St. Peters
- Jo Stafford
- Terry Stafford
- The Staple Singers
- Kay Starr
- Ray Stevens
- Al Stewart
- Enzo Stuarti
- Sugarloaf
- Gene Summers
- The Sunrays
- The Swallows
- Billy Swan
- Bettye Swann
- 13th Floor Elevators
- The Three Degrees
- The Tokens
- Kenny Vance
- Jimmy Velvit
- Johnny "Guitar" Watson
- We The People
- Roger Whittaker
- The Willows
- The Zakary Thaks
- Joe Zawinul

== See also ==
- Charly Records
- Rhino records
- Kent Records
- Bear Family Records
- Eric Records
- List of record labels
