= Jerry Blavat =

American disc jockey (1940–2023)

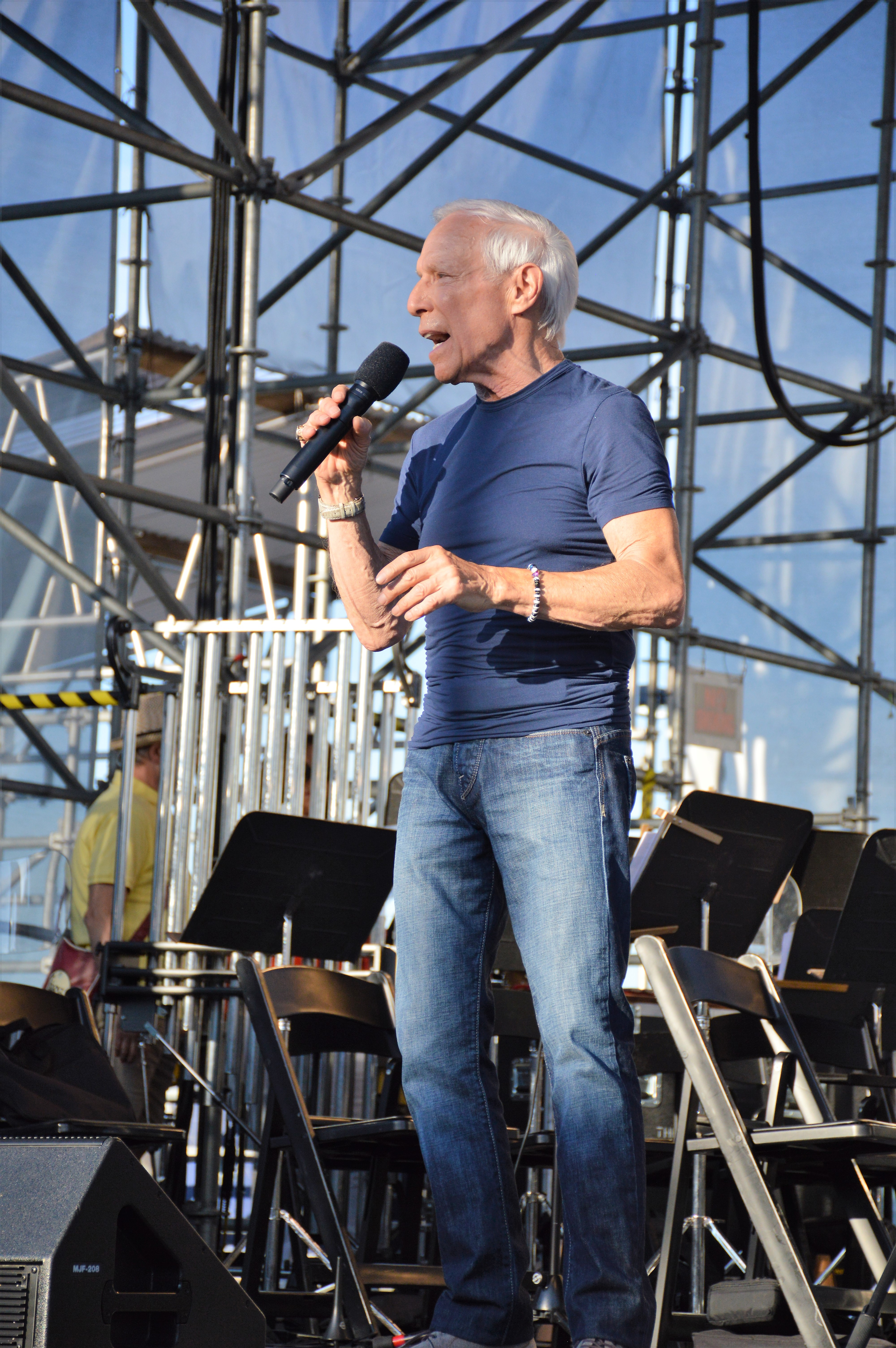
- Blavat in 2019
- Born: Gerald Joseph Blavat; July 3, 1940; Philadelphia, Pennsylvania, U.S.
- Died: January 20, 2023 (aged 82); Philadelphia, Pennsylvania, U.S.
- Children: 4
- Presenting career
- Show: Geator Gold Radio
- Stations: WFIL-TV, WVLT-FM, WTKU-FM, WXPN & WTYM-DB
- Style: Oldies
- Country: United States
- Website: Official website

Gerald Joseph Blavat (July 3, 1940 – January 20, 2023), also known as "The Geator with the Heater" and "The Big Boss with the Hot Sauce," was an American disc jockey and performer who had been a major influence in promoting oldies music on the radio. A Philadelphia icon, he gained local fame hosting live dances in the area, leading to his own independent radio show, on which he introduced many acts in the 1960s to a wide audience, including the Four Seasons and the Isley Brothers. Several notable musicians who hailed from the Philadelphia suburbs, including Daryl Hall and Todd Rundgren, cited Blavat as inspiring their musical careers.

== Early life ==
Jerry Blavat was born in South Philadelphia to a Jewish father and Italian mother. His sister, Roberta, was born two years earlier. His father was a bookmaker and his mother worked at the Philadelphia Naval Shipyard during World War II.

== Career ==
In 1953, Blavat debuted on the original Bandstand on WFIL-TV with Bob Horn and Lee Stewart. In 1956, he managed a national tour for Danny and the Juniors, and he worked as Don Rickles' valet in 1958–59. He got his start in radio on January 15, 1961, at WCAM in Camden, New Jersey. By 1963, his show was syndicated in Atlantic City, Trenton, Pottstown, Wilmington and Allentown. He said he refused to follow a playlist, "playing music from the heart, not a research chart." During the 1960s, Blavat was a partner in the Lost Nite and Crimson record labels, with Jared Weinstein and Collectables Records' founder Jerry Greene. Blavat made promotional appearances at Record Museum, a now-defunct chain of record stores based in Philadelphia, which was owned by Greene and Weinstein.

From 1965 to 1967, Blavat produced and hosted a weekly television show in Philadelphia called The Discophonic Scene, a dance show for "all my yon [sic] teens" along the lines of American Bandstand (which began in Philadelphia a decade earlier), referring to himself as "the Geator with the Heater" and "the big boss with the hot sauce." He guest-starred on television shows including The Mod Squad, The Monkees, The Tonight Show, and The Joey Bishop Show. He appeared in the movies Desperately Seeking Susan, Baby It's You, and Cookie. In 1972, Blavat purchased a nightclub in Margate, New Jersey, and named it "Memories".

== Alleged Mafia connections ==
In 1981, Blavat was having dinner at a South Philadelphia restaurant with Philadelphia Greek Mob boss Chelsais "Steve" Bouras, Philadelphia crime family soldier Raymond Martorano, and several other guests when Bouras was shot dead in a contract killing.

In the early 1990s, an investigation by the New Jersey State Commission of Investigation into organized crime's influence in the liquor business made public Blavat's association with the Bruno-Scarfo crime family. During the investigation, Thomas A. DelGiorno, a former Scarfo family capo, testified that Blavat had regularly paid a "street tax" to the crime family, had purchased a $40,000 yacht for crime boss Nicodemo Scarfo and was one of several individuals who purchased a condominium in Florida for Scarfo. In exchange, the criminal organization secured employment for Blavat throughout the state and also kept union organizers out of Blavat's nightclub. DelGiorno also testified that Blavat regularly served as a driver for crime boss Angelo Bruno. Blavat pled the fifth and repeatedly denied any wrongdoing, claiming that his relationship with the Bruno family was strictly personal and based on Mrs. Bruno's and his mother's ancestors having come from the same town in Italy.

== Later years ==
External videos
- “Lens Through Time: Jerry Blavat”, August 2, 2012, Philadelphia: The Great Experiment

In 1993, Blavat was inducted into the Philadelphia Music Alliance's Hall of Fame. In 1998, he was included in the Rock & Roll Hall of Fame as part of a permanent exhibit in its Museum of Radio and Records. In 2002, he was inducted into the Broadcast Pioneers of Philadelphia's "Hall of Fame". On January 15, 2020, Blavat celebrated his 60th consecutive year on radio.

Blavat continued to broadcast on local radio seven days a week and perform at several record hops and events a week in the greater Philadelphia area. He had been producing oldies concerts at the Kimmel Center for the Performing Arts in Philadelphia every year since January 2002. He was a regular columnist with his columns "Geator Gab" and "Ask the Geator" for the Atlantic City Weekly for over 20 years and from 2020 through 2022 wrote "Geator Gab" exclusively for the New Jersey Free Press. He had been a member of the New York Friars' Club since 2010 and had been the emcee of Time Life's annual Malt Shop Memories Cruise since 2011. His night club, Memories, where he continued to DJ during the summer, has been operating in Margate, New Jersey, since 1972. As of 2020, Blavat was a DJ for oldies radio station WVLT-FM 92.1 in the South Jersey area, for the University of Pennsylvania's public radio station WXPN in Philadelphia, for radio stations WTKU-FM and WOND in Atlantic City, WBCB (AM) in Bucks County and Trenton, and WISL (AM) in Shamokin, Pennsylvania. In 2020, Jerry expanded his radio network to the internet station Tyme 102.9 WTYM-DB in Zephyrhills, Florida.

In July 2011, Blavat's autobiography, You Only Rock Once: My Life In Music, was published by Running Press. After its third printing it was released two years later in paperback and as an audiobook in 2014.

Blavat was voted "Best Philly Icon" in a 2018 readers' poll conducted by Philadelphia magazine.

== Personal life and death ==
Blavat had four daughters, Kathi Furia, Geraldine Blavat, Stacy Braglia, and Deserie Downey, plus five grandchildren and five great-grandchildren. He was separated from his wife, Patricia Blavat, since 1972 and was in a long-term relationship with Rosalie (Keely) Stahl since 1989.

Blavat died in hospice at Methodist Hospital in Lower Moyamensing following complications from myasthenia gravis on January 20, 2023, at the age of 82. The City of Philadelphia ordered flags flown at half-mast and his funeral service at the Cathedral Basilica of Saints Peter and Paul (Philadelphia) was open to the public and attended by thousands. Dionne Warwick delivered the eulogy, citing Jerry as a major influence in launching her career.

== See also ==
- History of the Jews in Philadelphia
- History of the Italian Americans in Philadelphia
