= Sal Rota =

American musician

Sal Rota is an American musician, keyboard player, singer and songwriter. He was born in Philadelphia. He was a member of R&B group The Crystal Mansion, along with David White. In his 15 years of performing keyboards, organ and vocals with the Crystal Mansion, Sal recorded 2 albums and opened for acts such as Sly and the Family Stone, Rare Earth, Steppenwolf, and Mahavishnu Orchestra, among many others. Beginning in 1979, he was also a member of The Soul Survivors, known for their hit "Expressway to Your Heart", and then worked at The Springfield Inn with The Rage Band for 12 years.

Sal provided backup vocals on an album by Bernadette Peters.

== Discography ==
Crystal Mansion Featuring Johnny Caswell (1969, Capitol Records)
The Crystal Mansion (1971, Motown/Rare Earth)
Bernadette Peters (1980) MCA. Billboard 200 #114 (retitled and expanded as Bernadette in a 1992 CD reissue)
