= Lost Nite Records =

American reissue record label

Lost Nite Records was an American reissue independent record label, that was founded by Al Trommers, Jerry Greene, Jared Weinstein and Johnny Esposito in 1959 when they acquired the masters of "There's a Moon Out Tonight" by the Capris from Planet Records and rereleased it on Lost Nite in 1960.

== History ==
After this, Jerry and Jared relocated to Philadelphia from New York City. At this time, disc jockey Jerry Blavat was a partner in label until the late 1960s, at which time he sold back his interest in the company to Greene and Weinstein. Lost Nite, and its sister label Crimson Records, were known for releasing rare and hard-to-find doo-wop and R&B records. Lost Nite was one of the few labels responsible for keeping the doo-wop genre alive during the late 1960s and 1970s. The most popular single released by the label was "There's A Moon Out Tonight" by The Capris. The label released doo wop group the Paragons LP also. After the demise of Lost Nite, founder Jerry Greene established Collectables Records in 1980.

== Discography ==
LN2X series

- WFIL History of Rock: The 50s, Part 3 by Various Artists (1976) (2-LP)

2500 series

- WCBS-FM History of Rock: The Sixties, Part 1 by Various Artists (2-LP Picture Disc)

Collectors Limited Edition series

- LLP-1 Lee Andrews and the Hearts by Lee Andrews & the Hearts (1981)
- LLP-2 Lee Andrews and the Hearts, Part 2 by Lee Andrews & The Hearts (1981)
- LLP-3 The Jesters by The Jesters (1981)
- LLP-4 The Paragons by The Paragons(US doo wop group)(1981)
- LLP-5 The Collegians by The Collegians (1981)
- LLP-6 The Flamingos, Part 1 by The Flamingos (1981)
- LLP-7 The Flamingos, Part 2 by The Flamingos (1981)
- LLP-8 The Five Satins, Vol. 1 by The Five Satins (1981)
- LLP-9 The Five Satins, Part 2 by The Five Satins (1981)
- LLP-10 The Charts by The Charts (1981)
- LLP-11 The Bop Chords by The Bop Chords (1981)
- LLP-12 Jackie and the Starlites by Jackie & The Starlites (1981)
- LLP-13 Lewis Lymon and the Teenchords by Lewis Lymon & The Teenchords (1981)
- LLP-14 The Kodaks by The Kodaks (1981)
- LLP-15 The Channels, Vol. 1 by The Channels (1981)
- LLP-16 The Channels, Part 2 by The Channels (1981)
- LLP-17 Gladys Knight and the Pips by Gladys Knight & the Pips (1981)
- LLP-18 The Spaniels, Vol. I by The Spaniels (1981)
- LLP-19 The Spaniels, Vol. II by The Spaniels (1981)
- LLP-20 The El Dorados by The El Dorados (1981)
- LLP-21 The Dells by The Dells (1981)
- LLP-22 Jerry Butler and the Impressions by Jerry Butler & The Impressions (1981)
- LLP-23 The Moonglows by The Moonglows (1981)
- LLP-24 The Turtles by The Turtles (1981)
- LLP-25 The Turbans by The Turbans (1981)"Lost Nite Album Discography".

== See also ==
- Crimson Records
- List of record labels
