= Soul Survivors (band) =

American soul and R&B music group

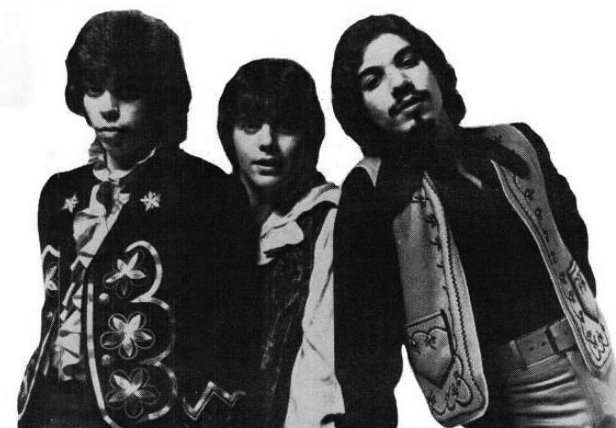
- Soul Survivors in 1969 (l-r Charlie Ingui, Kenny Jeremiah, Richie Ingui)

Background information
- Origin: Philadelphia, Pennsylvania, United States
- Genres: R&B

The Soul Survivors are an American, Philadelphia-based, soul and R&B group, founded by New York natives Richie and Charlie Ingui along with Kenny Jeremiah. The Soul Survivors are known for their 1967 hit single "Expressway to Your Heart", which was the first hit by Philadelphia soul record producers and songwriters Kenny Gamble and Leon Huff.

== History ==
The Soul Survivors first played together in New York under the name The Dedications, founded by Kenny Jeremiah, who released several singles under this name in 1962 and 1964. They adopted the name Soul Survivors in 1965. They signed to Philadelphia label Crimson Records, who put them in touch with Gamble & Huff. "Expressway to Your Heart" was a #1 hit regionally in Philadelphia and New York in the fall of 1967, and the tune reached #4 on the Billboard Hot 100 nationally. "Expressway to Your Heart" spent 15 weeks in the charts and sold over one million copies.

The follow-up was "Explosion in Your Soul", which was not as successful (U.S. #33); a third release, "Impossible Mission", also was a minor hit in 1969 (U.S. #68). They quit playing for a few years, but re-formed with a different lineup in 1972. They had one more hit, "City of Brotherly Love" in 1974. In the 1970s, the group lost its record contract and its manager and eventually disbanded. Charlie Ingui became a landscaper, Richie Ingui became a house painter, Paul Venturini became a restaurateur, and drummer Joe Forgione owned an auto body shop. At that time, Steely Dan noted in their song "Hey Nineteen": "It's hard times befallen the Soul Survivors".

In 1987, the Inqui brothers began playing occasional gigs as the original Soul Survivors and signed a five-record contract in 1991 with Society Hill Records. As of 2006, they were playing occasional dates in the Eastern United States. Chuck Trois also went on to release a solo 45 rpm single on A&M Records in August 1969, with "Mr. Holmes" on one side, and "A National Band" on the other.

Paul Venturini (b. June 10, 1945) died on April 17, 2001. Richie Ingui died of heart failure on January 13, 2017, at the age of 70. Jeremiah died of COVID-19 on December 4, 2020, at age 78.

== Members ==
- Charlie Ingui - vocals - original member *
- Richie Ingui - vocals (born Richard Ingui in Manhattan, New York; November 15, 1947 – January 13, 2017) - original member*
- Kenny Jeremiah - vocals (born Kenneth Scott Jeremiah in Northfield, New Jersey; November 22, 1942 – December 4, 2020) - original member*
- Joe Forgione - drums - original member* November 22, 1944 – October 20, 2003
- Paul Venturini - organ - original member*
- Chuck Trois - guitar
- Mike Burke - guitar
- Edward Leonetti - guitar
- Tony Radicello - bass
- John (Beedo) Dzubak Sr. - drums
- Sal Rota - keyboards
- Novac Noury (Jerry Noury) - organ and bass pedals during 1966
- Neil Larsen - keyboards (1974 album)
- Ralph Capobianco-Drums
- Mario Flamini-Drums
- Kevin Irvine-Keyboards,Vocals
- Frank Pagliante-Bass
- Mike DiMartinis-Guitar,Vocals
- David Kershner-Trumpet
- Jim Verdeur-Saxophones

== Discography ==
=== Albums ===
| Year | Album | Billboard 200 | R&B | Record Label |
|---|---|---|---|---|
| 1967 | When the Whistle Blows Anything Goes | 123 | 25 | Crimson Records |
| 1969 | Take Another Look | – | – | Atco Records |
| 1974 | Soul Survivors | – | – | TSOP Records |
| 1997 | Expressway to Your Heart | – | – | Collectables Records |

=== Singles ===
| Year | Title | Peak chart positions | | Record Label | B-side | Album |
| Year | Title | US | R&B | Record Label | B-side | Album |
|---|---|---|---|---|---|---|
| 1967 | "Expressway to Your Heart" | 4 | 3 | Crimson Records | "Hey Gyp" | When the Whistle Blows Anything Goes |
| 1967 | "Explosion in Your Soul" | 33 | 45 | Crimson Records | "Dathon's Theme" | |
| 1968 | "Impossible Mission (Mission Impossible)" | 68 | – | Crimson Records | "Poor Man's Dream" | |
| 1968 | "Turn Out the Fire" | – | – | Atco Records | "Go Out Walking" | Take Another Look |
| 1969 | "Mama Soul" | 115 | – | Atco Records | "Tell Daddy" | Take Another Look |
| 1970 | "Still Got My Head" | – | – | Atco Records | "Temptation 'Bout to Get Me" | |
| 1974 | "City of Brotherly Love" | – | 75 | TSOP Records | "The Best Time Was the Last Time" | Soul Survivors |
| 1974 | "What It Takes" | – | – | TSOP Records | "Virgin Girl" | Soul Survivors |
| 1975 | "Lover to Me" | – | – | TSOP Records | "Your Love" | Soul Survivors |
| 1976 | "Happy Birthday, America, Pt. 1" | – | – | Philadelphia International Records | "Happy Birthday, America, Pt. 2" | |

== Note ==
The Soul Survivors are not to be confused with the 1960s Denver-based garage rock band, also known as the Soul Survivors. The band included Bob Raymond, who was later with Sugarloaf.
