= K&A Gang =

Irish-American mob in the criminal underworld

The K&A Gang
- Founding location: Kensington, Philadelphia
- Years active: 1950s – mid 2000s
- Territory: Various neighborhoods in Northeast Philadelphia; River Wards; Kensington; Fishtown; Port Richmond; Philadelphia Badlands
- Ethnicity: Irish American
- Membership (est.): around 50–60 members and associates
- Criminal activities: Burglary, loan sharking, illegal gambling, drug trafficking, gun-running, racketeering, extortion, robbery, murder
- Allies: Scarfo crime family Genovese crime family Philadelphia Greek Mob; Pagan's Motorcycle Club; Outlaws Motorcycle Club
- Rivals: Various local street gangs: Junior Black Mafia; Kielbasa Posse

The K&A Gang, or the Northeast Philly Irish Mob, was a predominantly Irish-American criminal network based in Philadelphia, Pennsylvania. The K&A Gang was started following World War II and controlled the city's Irish-American criminal underworld for much of the late 20th century. The group was mainly a burglary ring for much of its early history, but shifted into loansharking, illegal gambling, racketeering, and ultimately drug trafficking in its later existence. The name K&A is derived from Kensington and Allegheny, the road intersection where the gang originally formed.

Domestically, the network was known to have ties to various criminal organizations in its surrounding area. They were known to have amicable ties to the La Cosa Nostra, namely the Scarfo crime family, but also the South Jersey faction of the New York City-based Genovese crime family, the local Greek mob, local Jewish-American gangsters, and various independent drug and hijacking gangs of various European ethnicities in the Greater Philadelphia area.

== History ==
=== Beginnings as a burglary ring ===
From the post-war 1950s to the 1970s, members of the network were tied to burglaries and theft operations all along the East Coast. While most of their work was around the Philadelphia area, they ventured out from their turf since the group's inception. A favored target was the wealthy residential Jewish suburbs, which would be the livelihood of the group for many years. The crew was adamant about not carrying weapons with them while they burglarized. This was largely due to the liability of increased jail time if caught with a firearm. They also traded the cliché burglary attire for professional suits, while on the job, in case they were stopped. In those days, there was no overarching structure within the gang. It was horizontal in nature, there being several prominent "crew chiefs" who held influence.

Their reach even extended outside the boundaries of Philadelphia as they targeted other ventures. In North Carolina, several members were known as the "Hallmark Gang" and would collaborate with the Dixie Mafia. They are also allegedly responsible for the Pottsville Heist in 1959. George Holmes alleges that a showgirl named Lillian Reis and Vickie Mason(AKA, Viola Lorenzo) gave the gang the tip they needed to pilfer $478,000 in cash and jewelry from the home of John B. Rich. Lillian "Tiger Lil" Reis and Her good friend Vickie were well-known nightclub entrepreneurs and former showgirls who had ties to the gangsters.

=== Expansion into the methamphetamine trade ===
By the late 1970s, with the advent of modern home-security technologies, the burglary racket was no longer viable as a main source of income. With the rise of the drug culture of the 1980s, the group began to focus less on their signature brand of thievery and more towards traditional criminal schemes and the booming methamphetamine trade. This was largely due to the immense profit that was available due to the high demand in the area.

By the early 1980s, John Carlyle Berkery had close ties with Angelo Bruno and Raymond Martorano of the Philadelphia crime family, as well as John McCullough, union boss of the Roofers' Union, Local 30. It was through these influential connections that the K&A Gang would expand into other rackets establishing its foothold in the Northeast.

In 1983, Philadelphia garnered a reputation as the "meth capital of the world", according to a statement published by the Associated Press, from a local police officer. It is widely held that this was made possible due to the K&A Gang, and the Junior Black Mafia, among others.

After being indicted for 14 counts of trafficking in methamphetamine and the chemical P2P in January 1982, Berkery fled to Ireland to avoid prosecution, where he supposedly had contacts in the Irish Republican Army. After spending five years on the run, he was captured in June 1987 and subsequently faced trial in the fall of 1987. Berkery admitted to engaging in a large scale meth deal with Chelsais Bouras, leader of the Philadelphia Greek Mob. Ronald Raiton, a notable criminal figure in the methamphetamine trade, testified that Berkery had bought 200 gallons of P2P from Raiton over the course of a year in 1980–1981. Prosecutors stated that Berkery and Raymond Martorano had planned to take over all meth trafficking in Philadelphia.

=== String of drug ring arrests ===
Carl "Better Days" Jackson assumed control of the group. Jackson went on to lead the group until their convictions in late 1987, just a week after their former boss faced trial and was also found guilty. Jackson was said to have gained around four million dollars in drug profits in the period between his takeover of the gang's meth endeavours and his eventual arrest. He received a lifetime sentence in accordance with the Continuing Criminal Enterprise Statute, otherwise known as the "drug kingpin" law.

Along with Carl Jackson and 22 affiliates of the K&A meth ring were indicted under federal drug manufacturing charges related to an operation that authorities believe produced roughly ten million dollars' worth of speed in hidden labs across the Pennsylvania area. They were said to have manufactured 100 pounds of methamphetamine at a time, which was then distributed by Jackson's subordinates. At the time, US Attorney Edward Dennis claimed in a press release that the gang was "one of the largest methamphetamine organizations in the nation". Edward Loney was to arrange the procurement of 50 gallons of P2P, a precursor chemical, along with Waldemar "Walter" Roeder from Toronto, while Jackson sold mass quantities to contacts in New York.

After the downfall of Carl Jackson, Roy Stocker became the dominant K&A member operating a methamphetamine manufacturing enterprise. In 1981, Stacker sought a partnership with Scarfo in an methamphetamine operation in Northeast Philadelphia, through Albert "Reds" Pontani. Between 1981 and 1986, he allegedly produced and distributed methamphetamine, commonly known as speed, and also allegedly took part in extortion, loan-sharking and burglary. The meth rings were sanctioned by the Scarfo crime family, who received a cut of the profits. In February 1991, Roy Stocker and three others were found guilty of operating a ring that sold $52 million worth of methamphetamine between 1981 and 1987.

=== Roofers' Union corruption ===
In the early 2000s, the Traitz brothers, who were connected to the K&A Gang through the Roofers' Union, Local 30, were indicted for the murder of Robert Hammond. He was allegedly assumed to be an informant on the meth operation that the Traitz brothers ran in tandem with members of the K&A Gang.

== Historical membership ==
=== Leaders ===
==== Burglary ring-era captains ====
The K&A burglary crew was a coalition of "crew chiefs" and the organization was a horizontal one in terms of structure.

- James "LaPa" McQuoid - K&A crew chief
- Edward "Effie" Burke Jr. – Influential K&A crew chief
- William "Willie" Sears – K&A crew leader
- Louis "Junior" Kripplebauer – K&A crew leader

==== Post-1980s leaders ====
Around 1980, the group switched to methamphetamine and with it came the need for a more hierarchical organization:

- (circa 1980–1982) – John Berkery – Scarfo crime family associate of Ray Martorano
- (1982–1987) – Carl Jackson – Leaders of the gang
- (1987–1991) - Roy Stocker – Influential meth manufacturer and K&A burglar who aligned himself with Nicky Scarfo
- Charles "Chick" Goodroe – Influential member in the K&A burglary ring
- Francis James Brewer – Member of the K&A burglary ring
- Leo Gillis – Member of the K&A burglary ring
- James "Jimmy" Dolan – Recruit of Eddie Burke and member of the K&A burglary ring
- Hugh "Hughie" Breslin – Member of the burglary crew – deceased
- James "Jimmy" Laverty – Member of the burglary ring
- John Gerard – Member of Carl Jackson's crew
- Dean Heiser – Member of the burglary ring
- Henry Saby – Member of Carl Jackson's meth ring
- Kenneth Miller – Cook for Carl Jackson's operation
- James McKenzie – Carl Jackson's key distributor
- Edward Loney – Carl Jackson's P2P supplier
- William "Chucky" McIlvain – Member of Carl Jackson's crew
- Raymond Brown – Member of the Stocker drug ring
- James "Lefty" Shannon – Member of the Stocker gang
- Terry Lees – Roy Stocker's methamphetamine cook
- William Stearn – Former Roofers' Union Local 30 president & member of the Stocker meth ring
- Robert "Irish Bobby" Kallaur – Former professional boxer and enforcer for Roy Stocker
- Michael Caputo – Member of the Stocker drug ring
- Barry Saltzburg – Member of the Stocker organization
- John "John L" McManus – Former K&A Burglar of repute. Friend and Associate of Hughie Breslin, Jimmy Laverty, John McCullough, Jack Johnston, Eddie Berkery, Charles "Chicky" Shaeffer, James "Junior" Smith and Pete Logue. Also uncle of John and Mark Goodwin from the Traitz Brothers RICO Trial. (See Hornblaum book—various references and clippings below upon release and marketing of the book.)
- John Goodwin – Former K&A burglar & Roofers' Union member and member of the Traitz meth ring
- John Boggs
- Rob "Juvie" Stewart – Member of the notorious DZP/Local 666 gang
- Donald "Don" Ray McCullough Jr. – K&A associate – whereabouts are unknown
- Owen "O" Dunn K&A associate, mostly known as C.K. member (County Kings crew)
- Joseph "Blackie" Battel -Greeb Street Counts K&A member and crew chief, Roofers' Union affiliate, owner of Northeast Philadelphia's Sherwood Club
- Daniel Gundaker – Member of the burglary ring

== See also ==
- History of Irish Americans in Philadelphia
- Philadelphia Badlands
