= The Soul Survivors (Denver band) =

American garage rock band

Background information
- Origin: Denver, Colorado, United States
- Genres: Garage rock; folk rock; psychedelic
- Years active: 1960s
- Label: Dot
- Past members: Allen Kemp (deceased); Gene Chalk (deceased); Bob Raymond (deceased); John Day; Pat Shanahan

The Soul Survivors were an American garage rock band from Denver, Colorado, who were active in the mid-1960s. Included in their roster were Allen Kemp and Pat Shanahan, who later become members of the Poor before joining Ricky Nelson as members of his "Stone Canyon Band" and later the New Riders of the Purple Sage in the late 1970s. They are not to be confused with the Philadelphia group of the same name.

The Soul Survivors were founded in 1963 in Denver, Colorado. Their membership consisted of Allen Kemp on lead guitar, Gene Chalk on rhythm guitar, Bob Raymond on bass, John Day on organ, and Pat Shanahan on drums. The band practiced in garages and backyards, sometimes to the dismay of neighbors who complained of the noise. They signed with Dot Records of Los Angeles and released two singles in the mid-1960s. In October 1965 they cut their debut single for Dot, the fuzz-drenched "Can't Stand to Be in Love With You" backed with "Look at Me." In March 1966 they followed it up with "Hung Up on Loosin' b/w "Snow Man", also on Dot. Group members Allen Kemp, Pat Shanahan and John Day moved to Los Angeles and teamed up with Randy Meisner, previously with the Drivin' Dynamics, and Randy Naylor to form the Poor. After the demise of the Poor, Kemp and Shanahan went on to play in Rick Nelson's "Stone Canyon Band" ("Garden Party") and later in New Riders of the Purple Sage. Day joined the short-lived group Two Guitars, Piano, Drum and Darryl. Meisner later joined popular 1970s rock bands the Eagles and Poco. Raymond would later join the group Sugarloaf (band).

== Membership ==
- Allen Kemp (lead guitar)
- Gene Chalk (rhythm guitar)
- Bob Raymond (bass)
- John Day (organ)
- Pat Shanahan (drums)

== Discography ==
- "Can't Stand to Be in Love With You" b/w "Look at Me" (Dot 19793, October 1965)
- "Hung Up on Loosin' b/w "Snow Man" (Dot 16830, March 1966)
