= Philadelphia Greek Mob =

Greek-American organized crime group

- Founding location: Philadelphia, Pennsylvania, United States
- Years active: ca.1970-ca.1990
- Territory: Greater Philadelphia (including South Jersey), Baltimore, and Washington, D.C.
- Ethnicity: Greek American
- Activities: Racketeering, drug trafficking, arms trafficking, extortion, loansharking, illegal gambling, labor racketeering, fraud, smuggling, and murder
- Allies: K&A Gang; Philadelphia crime family

The Philadelphia Greek Mob, also known as the Philadelphia Greek Mafia, was a loose-knit Greek mafia faction consisting of Greek-American racketeers and drug dealers operating in Philadelphia, Pennsylvania. The group was closely affiliated with the Italian-American Philadelphia crime family, and it fell under almost complete control of the Italian-American Mafia family during the reign of Philadelphia Mafia boss Nicky Scarfo. While based in and operating mostly in Philadelphia and the Greater Philadelphia metro area, especially South Philadelphia, West Philadelphia, Upper Darby, and South Jersey, the organization also had operations in Baltimore and Washington, D.C., at its peak.

== History ==
A loose confederation of Greek-American gangsters headed by Chelsais "Steve" Bouras controlled a vast drug market in Philadelphia and operated under the protection of Philadelphia crime family boss Angelo Bruno.

Throughout the 1970s until 1981, Bouras headed the Greek Mob in Philadelphia, participating in mostly loansharking, extortion, methamphetamine trade, and illegal gambling. Bouras directed the mob efficiently, and he carried out business with more prominent families such as the Philadelphia Mafia. He was a close associate of Italian wiseguy and Scarfo soldier Raymond Martorano.

=== Assassination of Bouras ===
On May 27, 1981, at the Venetis Greek restaurant in South Philadelphia, Bouras and his girlfriend, Jeannette Curro, were gunned down while dining with Ray Martorano and Philadelphia radio personality Jerry Blavat.

Bouras was 50 years old and Jeannette Curro was 54. Though Bouras and Curro were killed, Martorano and Blavat were only wounded. It is reported that Nicodemo Scarfo of Philadelphia's notorious Philadelphia crime family ordered the hit, as Bouras had refused to pay Scarfo's street taxes, specifically for his meth ring. There have also been speculations that Martorano arranged the hit for Scarfo because of eyewitness claims that the gunman motioned for Martorano to move out of the way before opening fire. To this day, no one has ever been connected with the hit. The assassination took place just one day after the murder of another Greek mobster, Harry Peetros of Upper Darby.

Curro's family also had ties to the Mafia; the FBI had been investigating her nephew, Joe "Crutch" Curro, a made member of the Philadelphia Cosa Nostra, after they recorded him on a 1976 FBI wiretap at Frank’s Cabana Steaks in South Philadelphia, at the time a base of operations for Philadelphia Mafia capo Frank Sindone.

After Bouras' assassination, the Greek Mob did get involved with the mob war in Philadelphia in the 1980s, attempting to gain rackets in Atlantic City, but activity declined after the war. They were also involved in the high profile prosecution of Mafia lawyer Robert F. Simone in 1994. Simone was a close associate in the 1980s.

A two-year FBI investigation into a cocaine ring run by the Greek mafia in Baltimore, Philadelphia, and Washington, D.C. resulted in charges being filed in August 1987.

== Current activity ==
Although rather prominent in the 1970s and 1980s, the Greek Mob has cooled down and remains rather dormant. However, there have been some occurrences of members being found loan sharking in Philadelphia in modern times. The reason for this dormant period could be traced back to the leaders' loss in the 1980s mob war in Philadelphia, which was initiated after Martineos' assassination.
