= There's a Moon Out Tonight =

Single by The Capris
- B-side: "Indian Girl"
- Released: 1958 (limited); 1960
- Recorded: 1958
- Genre: Doo-wop
- Length: 2:10
- Label: Planet (1958); Lost Nite (1960); Old Town (1960)
- Songwriters: Al Striano; Alberico Gentile; Joe Luccisano

"There's a Moon Out Tonight" is a song originally released in 1958 by The Capris. The initial release on the Planet label saw very limited sales, and the Capris disbanded. In 1960, after a disk jockey played the song on air, the public interest that was generated led to it being re-released on the Lost Nite label, and later that year on the Old Town label. The group reunited shortly thereafter.

In early 1961, "There’s a Moon Out Tonight" spent 14 weeks on the Billboard Hot 100 chart peaking at No. 3, while reaching No. 11 on Billboard's Hot R&B Sides, and No. 14 on Canada's CHUM Hit Parade.

The song was ranked No. 50 on Billboard's end of year "Hot 100 for 1961 - Top Sides of the Year" and No. 51 on Cash Box's "Top 100 Chart Hits of 1961".

== Chart performance ==
Chart (1961)	Peak position
US Billboard Hot 100	3
US Billboard Hot R&B Sides	11
Canada – CHUM Hit Parade	14
