= The Capris =

American doo wop group

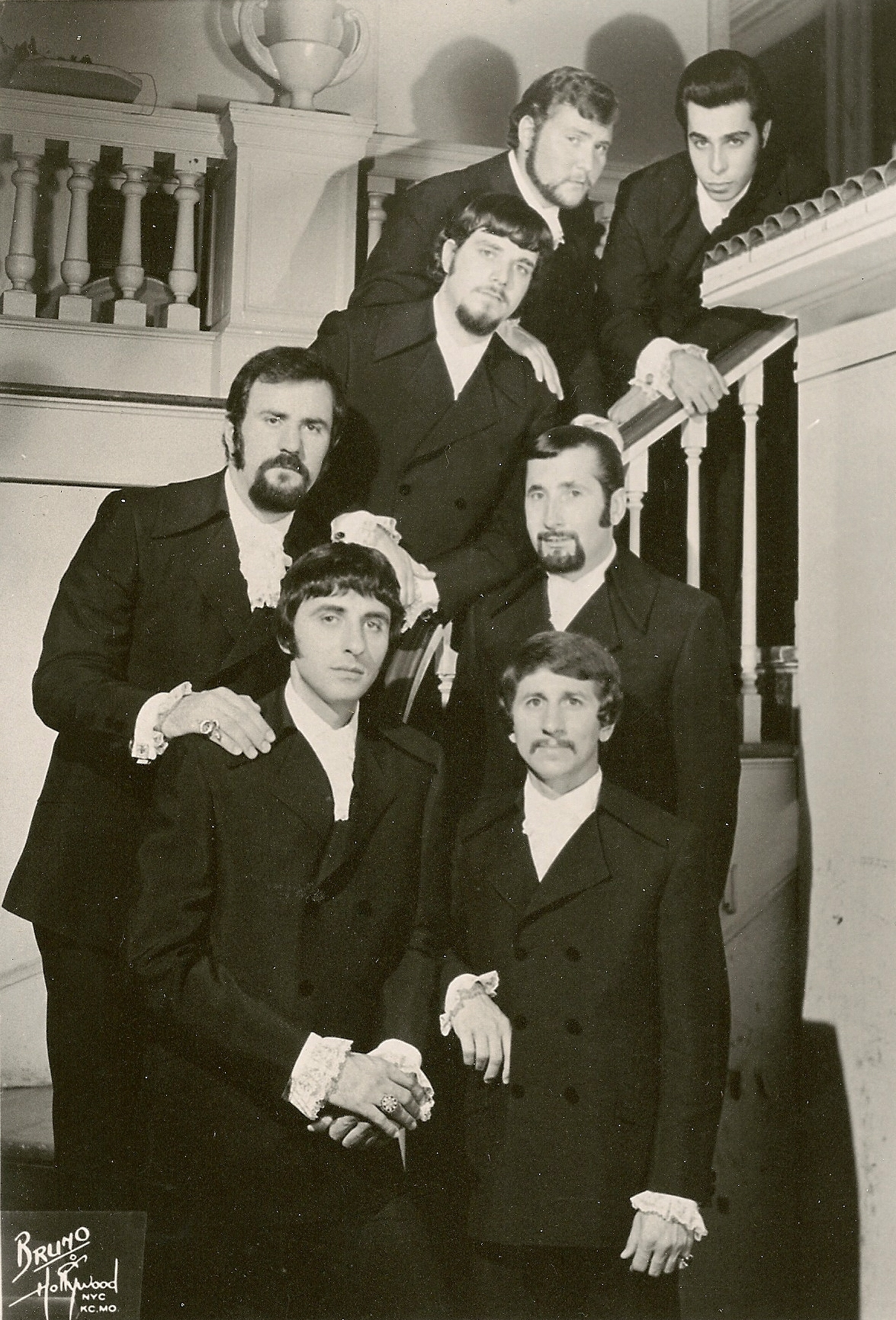
- The Capris, 1969

Background information
- Origin: Ozone Park, Queens, New York, United States
- Genres: Doo wop
- Years active: 1957–1958, 1960–present
- Labels: Planet, Lost Nite, Old Town, Ambient Sound, Columbia Records
- Members: Frank Reina (original **) Tony Sergi; John Monforte; Michael D'Amore
- Past members: John Apostol ** Nick "Santo" Santamaria; Mike Mincieli ** Vinnie Naccarato; John Cassese; Bill Chefalas ** Johnny Harris ** Mickey Henry ** Andy Katchianos; Al Diaz**; Tony Danno; Tommy Ferrara; Wayne Smith; Lou Esposito **Shown in picture above

The Capris are an American doo wop group who became a one-hit wonder in 1961 with "There's a Moon Out Tonight." They experienced a popularity and performing resurgence in the 1980s, when three members reformed and The Manhattan Transfer recorded their song, "Morse Code of Love," which reached the US Hot 100 and the U.S. AC top 20.

== History ==
The group originated in Ozone Park, Queens in 1957 when they were teenagers. The original members were Rosario Morice (aka Sonny Boy, Lead), though he left the group before recording he has always been recognized by the group when attending a performance. Nick Santamaria (aka Nick Santo, lead), Mike Mincieli (first tenor), Frank Reina (second tenor), Vinnie Naccarato, (baritone), and John Cassese (bass). They were all around 15 years of age at the time and still in school. Rosario, Vinnie, Mike, Tony, and John all went to John Adams High School, while Nick was a student at Woodrow Wilson and Frank attended Franklin K. Lane. Mike Mincieli, started the group and recruited the members. In the spring/summer of 1958 the final member was recruited and really got things together. They originally called themselves "the Supremes" but soon changed to "The Capris." It is often thought their name came from the island of Capri, since the boys were all Italian, but Nick confirmed in a 1993 interview with Greg Milewski, that they named themselves after the 1957 Lincoln Capri.

By 1958 the group had started gaining experience and popularity by performing at local venues, school dances and churches. They attracted the attention of independent record producers. Soon they would record their first single.All of the original members were Italian Americans from the borough of Queens in New York, United States. Started by first tenor Mike Mincieli and Rosario Morice (Sonny) who later left the group when he joined the Navy, the original group coalesced in 1958 – also including Nick Santo (Santamaria) lead baritone, second tenor Frank Reina, baritone Vinnie Narcardo, and bass John Cassese. Their name was taken from the Lincoln Capri. In 1958, they recorded two songs for Planet Records, "Indian Girl," and "There's a Moon Out Tonight." When the record sold badly, they disbanded and went their separate ways. Alan Fredericks, a late night radio disc jockey continued to play their song, piquing the interest of Jerry Greene, an employee of the Times Square Record Store. Greene purchased the master and re-issued the record on Lost Nite Records. WINS 1010's disc jockey Murray the K played the song often, and it sold well. Realizing that their manufacturing and distribution capacity could not meet the demands of a hit record, Greene and Lost Nite sold their interest to Old Town Records, which had the capacity to meet the needs of the 1961 number three national hit.

Their break came when they responded to an ad placed in a local paper by two wanna-be producers. At the audition, they sang a ballad, "There's A Moon Out Tonight" (words and music by Joseph Luccisano, Alfonso Gentile & Alfred Striano) and soon they found themselves at Bell Sound Studios New York cutting the song, along with an uptempo number, "Indian Girl." Released on Planet Records in the autumn of 1958, the record became an almost instant obscurity. (An original Planet pressing of the single can now fetch up to $1500 in collectors circles.) "There's A Moon Out Tonight" has a unique ending, chiming down from falsetto to bass instead of the other way around. Each Capri sings the tune's title in turn, but slightly lower (and slower) than the preceding member. Along with that song, they only recorded one other song, entitled "Indian Girl," on the flip side.

An obsessive record collector Jerry Greene (later the owner of the reissue label Collectables) was working at Times Square Record Shop (a purveyor of records located in the heart of Times Square, Broadway and 42nd Street), not for money, but in exchange for hard-to-get records. Under the wise ownership of Irving "Slim" Rose, the subway arcade shop influenced radio play and record sales nationwide in the early 1960s. Since the doo-wop sound was still current in New York City in the early 1960, it was possible for some 45s specifically reissued at Slim's behest to receive much wider airplay, as new singles, since they were not national hits (or, in many cases, even known) on first release. "There's a Moon Out Tonight," The Shells' "Baby Oh Baby," the Chanters' "No, No, No," and, notably, the Edsels', "Rama Lama Ding Dong," all began their long ascent of the national charts from that lowly subway arcade.

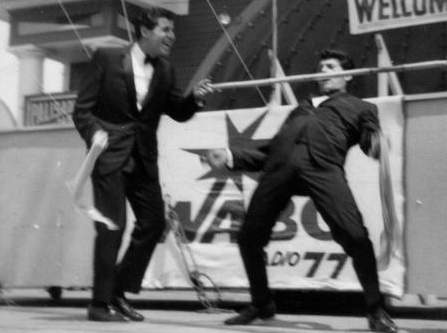
Palisades Amusement Park - 1962 Narcardo and Cassese perform "Limbo" on the free act stage.

For a time, the Capris toured and performed in major venues all over the United States, but none of their follow up records sold well, and by 1963, members of the original group started to leave the ensemble. Some continued to perform locally as the Capris, but with no national profile.

By 1965, Vinnie (died 30 December 2008) and John had left the group. To replace them, in 1966, they recruited John Apostle (died 24 December 2003) to sing bass. For the next three years, the group performed in various local clubs, and since they were only a three-member vocal group, hired various local backup musicians to work with them.

In May, 1969, John Apostle, wanting to have a more stable and permanent show group, approached Bill Chefalas, the lead singer and bass player of The Carasels, a New York City area, top-40, show group—formed in 1965—and asked him if he would be interested in combining groups, and thus, the Capris became a seven-member, self-contained show group. They now consisted of Frank Reina (lead singer), Mike Mincieli (first tenor), John Apostle (bass), Bill Chefalas (falsetto, bass guitar, music and show arranger), Al Dimone (second tenor, guitar), Mickey Henry (keyboard), and Johnny Harris (drums). Before playing bass guitar, Chefalas received formal piano training, studied drums with Louie Belson, and played with various jazz groups. He sang backup falsetto on many recordings by Help Truth and the Portraits and was formerly the lead singer and bass player with The Resounders. The group now again had five vocalists that could cover the range of the original founding group, of which, two of them were also musicians.

The newly formed group rehearsed for a few months and on July 10, 1969, recorded the "Freedom Medley" at Town Sound Studios in Englewood, New Jersey. The recording was a combination of "People Gotta Be Free" and "Abraham, Martin and John" and was produced and arranged by Chefalas. It was the only studio recording the Capris ever made that used a full orchestra, including violins. It was submitted to six record companies but never picked up. The recording they were told, did not have the "oldie" sound and was too contemporary. On September 6, 1969, the new Capris, ready to go on the road, performed their first night club act at the Quiet Village in Levittown, New York. From then on, all the club shows were arranged and scored by Chefalas.

In the early 1970s there was a renewed interest in America for oldies music from the 1950s. With this increased interest came a desire for fans from the sock hop era to see their heroes in concert one more time and for new fans to discover what all of the fuss was about. Soon, a series of "rock and roll revival" concerts were held in New York City, and on November 29, 1969, The Capris were the opening act at Richard Nader's Rock & Roll Revival, Volume II, at Madison Square Garden's Felt Forum, which headlined Jackie Wilson, and Bill Haley and the Comets. Nader died on December 9, 2009.

In March 1970, Mickey Henry, the keyboard player left the group and was not replaced. In December 1970, Andy Katchianos replaced Johnny Harris (died December 1972) on the drums.

For the next 11 years, the group continued to perform over four hundred shows in numerous night clubs, concerts, and private affairs in and around the tri-state area and along the east coast. On June 2, 1972, the group performed at Richard Nader's Rock & Roll Spectacular, Volume VIII, at Madison Square Garden, which headlined Fats Domino, Bo Diddley, Chubby Checker, and a surprise appearance by Little Richard. The show was recorded and released as Live at Madison Square Garden 1972. That performance, which was reportedly released two different ways—the original Warner Bros. LP was heavily sweetened in the studio, where the subsequent reissues were made from untouched tapes from the original show.

Andy Katchianos was replaced by Al "Baby Al" Puglisi on drums in 1975. In 1976, Puglisi left to join Tommy James and the Shondells and was replaced by Tony Danno on drums. In 1982, Danno switched places and became baritone singer with The Capris and consequently left the group in 1985 to join Lenny Coco and the Chimes. He now sings with The Manhattan Skyline. Danno was the original drummer for Harold Melvin and the Blue Notes and played on many of their albums.

In 1976, Tom Ferrara, who had been an original member of the Del Satins (Teardrops Follow Me), which had become Johnny Maestro (died March 24, 2010) & The Brooklyn Bridge, replaced John Apostle. Ferrara's brother Fred, was also a member if the Del Satins and went on as a member of the Brooklyn Bridge. Apostle died on December 24, 2003. Maestro was well known in the entertainment industry, with more than 25 years of experience as a performer, booking agent, personal manager, concert promoter, theatrical producer and publisher. In 1972, he formed Banner Talent Associates, through which he represented artists such as Gary U.S. Bonds, The Brooklyn Bridge, The Five Satins, The Belmonts, The Capris, Chubby Checker and The Drifters. He managed the careers of The Brooklyn Bridge, The Belmonts, The Dovells, The Crystals, Bullet, Jay and The Americans, Tommy James and The Shondells, and Wild Cherry. Apostle had promoted concerts at Madison Square Garden, Nassau Coliseum and various other venues in the New York metropolitan area.

The group appeared as a closing act at many New Year's Eve celebrations at the Colonie Hill Resort in Hauppauge, Long Island, including 1977 with Gloria Gaynor, 1978 with Enzo Stuarti, 1979 with Robert Goulet, and in 1981 with Frankie Avalon.

In 1980, Chefalas and Dimone retired and left the group, and in 1982, Nick Santo rejoined and resurrected the group and they went into the studio to record a new album, "There's a Moon out Again," for Ambient Sound (Records). Besides doing covers of some doo wop classics, The Capris also included a couple of original tunes. One of these was a song called "Morse Code of Love," a song that Nick had started writing in 1961, but never finished until 1981. It was also released as a single in 1982, backed with "There's a Moon out Again," and featured Nick singing lead, Tommy Ferrara singing bass, Mike Mincieli singing first tenor, Frankie Reina singing second tenor, and Tony Danno singing baritone. Although a new record, oldies stations started picking up the song (after it was released as a single), as the tune sounded like it was from the late 1950s, and thinking it was a hot oldie they had overlooked, "Morse Code Of Love" eventually became the number one requested "oldie" in Pittsburgh, Boston and Philadelphia. The song got even more exposure when it was covered by the Manhattan Transfer, as "Baby Come Back To Me" in 1985. This version peaked at number 83 on Billboard.

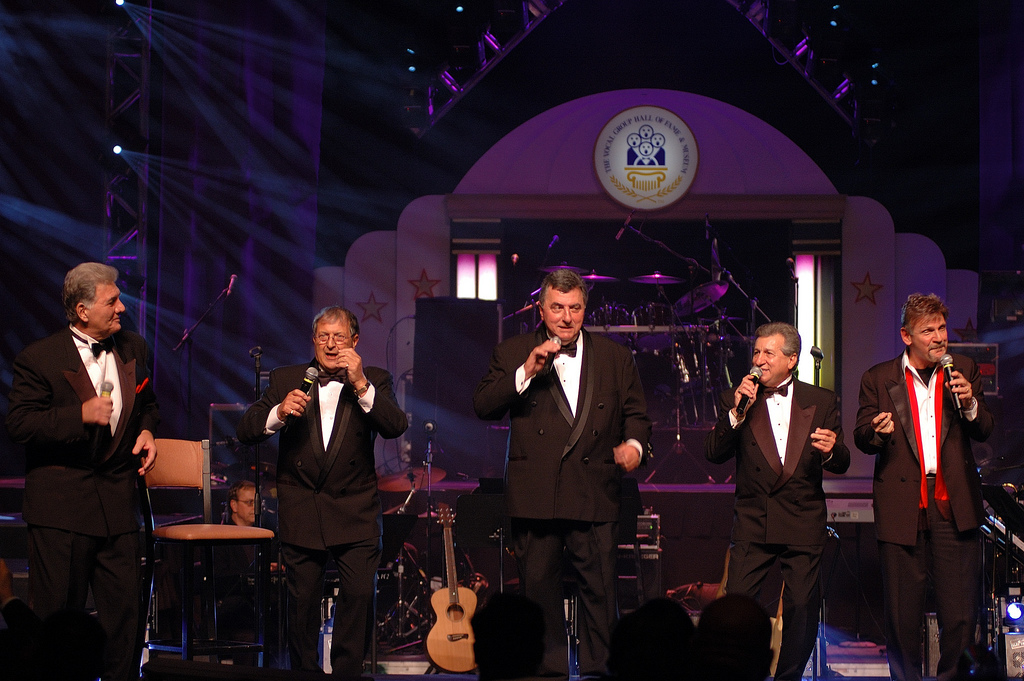
The Capris - 2007 Vocal Group Hall Of Fame induction ceremony

Nick Santo, who left the group in 1962 and joined the New York City Police Department in 1965, continued to write songs. In 1982, Santo, Mike Mincieli, and Frank Reina – joined at the time by Tommy Ferrara of The Del-Satins and Tony Danno, recorded There's a Moon Out Again, an album of 12 songs, including nine compositions by Santo. "The Morse Code of Love," one of Santo's songs, quickly became a requested number on Oldies radio, with many disc jockeys and audience members believing it to be an unreleased song by the original Capris. In 1984, The Manhattan Transfer recorded "The Morse Code of Love" as "Baby Come Back to Me" for their Bop Doo-Wopp album and released it as a single. It reached number 83 on the Billboard Hot 100 and number 14 on the Adult Contemporary Chart.

Santo, Mincieli, and Reina, with other singers, continued to perform as the Capris until at least 2002.

Santo died as a result of cancer on December 30, 2010, at age 69. The Capris are still performing with Frank Reina (original member )

Mike Mincieli (born Michael Mincieli; their original first tenor) died on March 15, 2015.

Wayne Smith, their most recent lead singer, died on March 12, 2016.

== Style ==
Santo's favorite singer was Clyde McPhatter, along with James Shephard of Shep and the Limelites. The Capris patterned their sound on African-American vocal groups, rather than fellow Italian-Americans such as Dion DiMucci.

== Discography ==
=== Singles ===
Singles
Title	Release info	Year	Notes
"There's a Moon Out Tonight" / "Indian Girl"	Planet P-1010	1958	
"There's a Moon Out Tonight" / "Indian Girl"	Lost-Nite L-101	1960	
"There's a Moon Out Tonight" / "Indian Girl"	Old Town 1094	1960	
"There's a Moon Out Tonight" / "Indian Girl"	Trommers TR-101	1961	
"Where I Fell in Love" / "Some People Think"	Old Town 1099	1961	
"Tears in My Eyes" / "Why Do I Cry"	Old Town 1103	1961	
"Girl in My Dreams" / "My Island In The Sun"	Old Town 1107	1961	
"Limbo" / "From the Vine Came the Grape"	Mr. Peeke Records MP 118	1962	
"Freedom Medley" (unreleased)		1969	
"Morse Code of Love" / "There's a Moon Out Again"	Ambient Sound / CBS	1982	

=== Albums ===
- 1982: There's a Moon Out Again
- 1992: Morse Code of Love
- 2000: There's A Moon Out Tonight - The Very Best Of The Capris
