= Expressway to Your Heart =

Single by The Soul Survivors

from the album When the Whistle Blows Anything Goes
- B-side: "Hey Gyp"
- Released: July 1967
- Genre: Philadelphia soul
- Length: 2:21
- Label: Crimson 1010
- Songwriter: Kenny Gamble and Leon Huff
- Producer: Kenny Gamble and Leon Huff

The Soul Survivors singles chronology
"Expressway to Your Heart" (1967)	"Explosion in Your Soul" (1967)

"Expressway to Your Heart" is a song written by Kenny Gamble and Leon Huff and performed by the Soul Survivors. It appeared on their 1967 album, When the Whistle Blows Anything Goes, which was produced by Gamble and Huff.

The song reached No. 3 on the R&B chart and No. 4 on the Billboard Hot 100 in 1967, and was ranked No. 18 on Billboard magazine's Top Hot 100 songs of 1967.

== Other versions ==
- Gil Now, with French lyrics, titled "Les Oiseaux dans la ville" in 1968.
- Don Bryant, on his album Precious Soul.
- The Vibrations with Gamble & Huff producing, in 1969 on Neptune Records.
- Amen Corner as the B-side to their single "Judge Rumpel Crassila" in 1969 in the Netherlands.
- Jerry Garcia and Merl Saunders, in 1973.
- Margo Thunder, as a single in 1975. It reached No. 25 on the R&B chart.
- Mike Finnigan, as a single in 1978.
- The Blues Brothers, as a single in 1981.
- Breakfast Club, as a single in 1988. It reached No. 30 on the Dance chart in 1989.
- King Tee sampled The Soul Survivors version on their song "Do Your Thing" which was featured on his 1990 album, At Your Own Risk.
- Bruce Springsteen performed it on his 2009 Working on a Dream Tour.
- Southside Johnny and the Asbury Jukes

== In popular culture ==
- The 1987 film Adventures in Babysitting featured a version of the song performed by Southside Johnny and the Asbury Jukes.
- The 1987 Disney Channel TV special D-TV: Doggone Valentine used the Soul Survivors version, shown with clips of Goofy and other Disney cartoon dog characters in their cars, fighting their way through various traffic jams.
- The Soul Survivors rendition was used in the 1996 movie, Striptease.
