= Crimson Records =

American independent record label

Crimson Records was an American reissue independent record label founded by Jerry Greene in the early 1960s, and was a sister label of Lost Nite Records. Disc jockey Jerry Blavat was a co-owner of the label until the late 1960s. The label was known for releasing rare and hard-to-find doo-wop and R&B records. During its existence, Crimson released two LPs and approximately 18 singles. The most popular single released by the label was "Expressway to Your Heart" by The Soul Survivors.

== Discography ==
=== Albums ===
- LP-501 Jerry Blavat Presents Guess What? by Various Artists (issued December 1966)
- LP-502 When The Whistle Blows Anything Goes by The Soul Survivors (issued November 1967)

=== Singles ===
- 1010 "Expressway to Your Heart" by The Soul Survivors
- 1012 "Explosion (In My Soul)" by The Soul Survivors b/w "Dathon's Theme"
- 1016 "Impossible Mission (Mission Impossible)" by The Soul Survivors
- 1008 "I Need Your Love" b/w "Not My Baby" by The Masters (with John Oates)

== See also ==
- Lost Nite Records
- List of record labels
