= Daniel O'Leary (mobster) =

American mobster

Daniel J. "Danny" O'Leary (January 30, 1900 - August 15, 1928) was an Irish Philadelphia mobster involved in bootlegging who, a rival of Maxie "Boo Boo" Hoff throughout Prohibition, would struggle for dominance among the many gangs of Philadelphia's underworld. His death, only six days after his participation in the gangland slaying of Hugh "Hughie" McLoon, would mark the beginning of gang wars during the late 1920s eventually leading to a Special August Grand Jury investigating corruption and influence of organized crime in the city.
