= George Martorano =

American convicted criminal (born December 21, 1950)

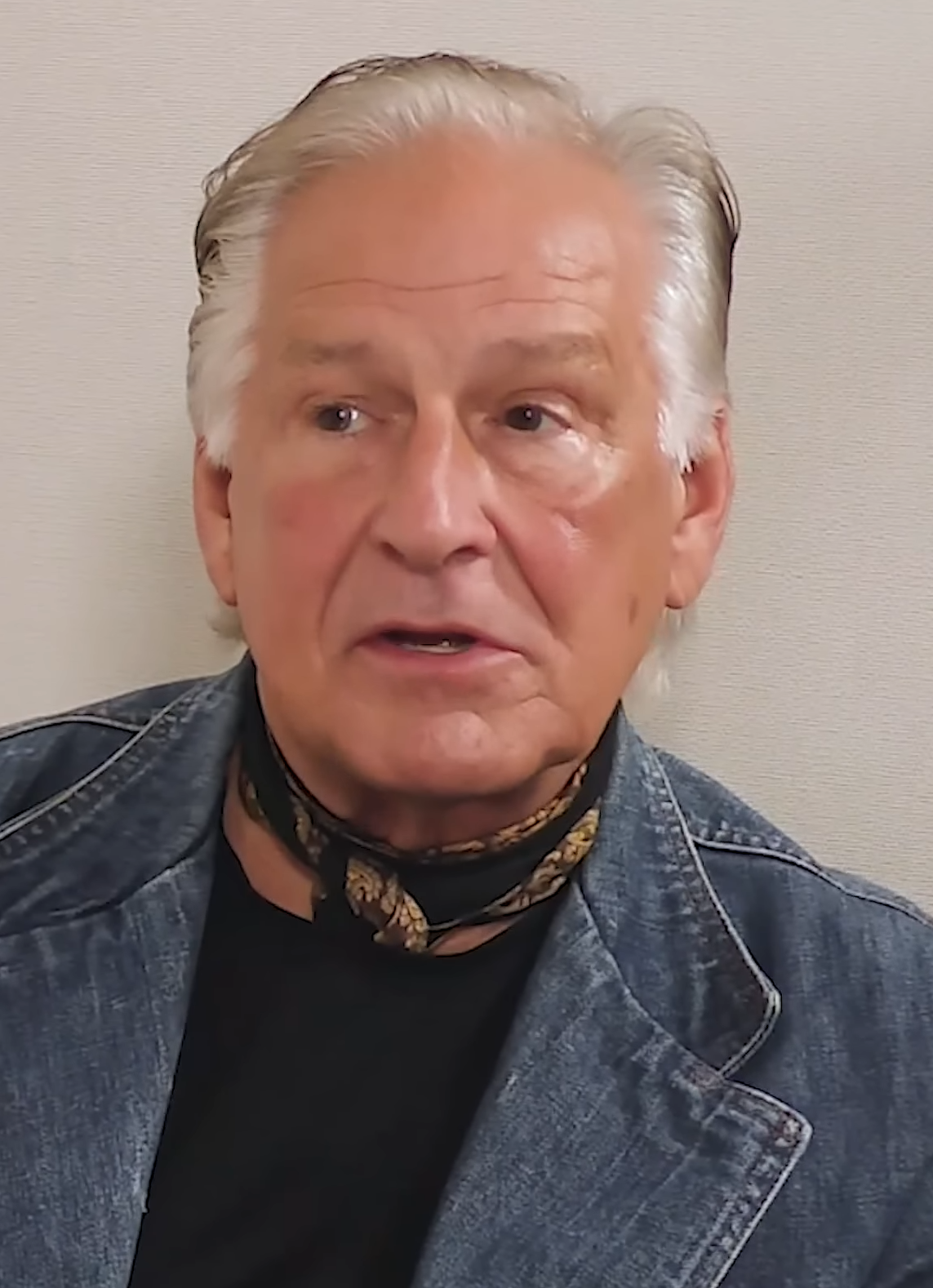
- Martorano in 2024
- Born: George John Martorano; December 21, 1949 (age 76); Philadelphia, Pennsylvania, U.S.
- Other name: "Cowboy"
- Occupations: Mobster; drug trafficker
- Relatives: Raymond Martorano (father)
- Status: Released
- Allegiance: Philadelphia crime family
- Convictions: Distribution of Narcotics, Operation of a Continuing Criminal Enterprise (1984)
- Penalty: Life imprisonment (1984)

George John "Cowboy" Martorano (born December 21, 1949) is an American former mobster and Philadelphia crime family associate. He was sentenced to life in prison without parole in 1984 on drug charges. Martorano was one of the longest-serving, first-time, non-violent offender's in the Federal Bureau of Prisons at the time of his release in October 2015, after serving over 32 years.

== Federal drug conviction ==
Martorano headed a narcotics ring which distributed 60 kilograms of cocaine, thousands of pounds of marijuana, hundreds of thousands of counterfeit Quaaludes, and an uncalculated quantity of methamphetamine per year, with annual profits exceeding $75 million. The vast operation utilized two airplanes and an airstrip in Hastings, Florida owned by Martorano, which transported cocaine and marijuana from Jamaica and South America.

The drug network was infiltrated by two undercover Federal Bureau of Investigation (FBI) agents during a fifteen-month investigation. The agents recorded over 150 conversations and 18 business meetings, mostly in Center City hotels. On September 20, 1983, Martorano and thirteen others were indicted by a federal grand jury on drug trafficking charges. Martorano was arrested in Miami. Two kilograms of heroin, thousands of pounds of marijuana, 340,000 counterfeit Quaaludes, $125,000 in cash, six cars, and three trucks were also seized as a result of the investigation.

In 1984, on the advice of his attorney Robert Simone, Martorano pleaded guilty to 19 counts of drug possession and distribution. Martorano was subsequently advised by both the prosecution and the judge, John Berne Hannum, that this plea could result in a sentence of life without the possibility of parole. The prosecution, however, had only recommended a sentence of from 40 to 54 months. On September 20, 1984, Martorano was sentenced to life in prison without the possibility of parole, the longest prison term ever imposed on a first-time non-violent offender in American history.

=== Controversy ===
Martorano's father was reputed mobster Raymond "Long John" Martorano. Louis Pichini, a prosecutor with the U.S. Organized Crime Task Force, pressured George Martorano for information on the Philadelphia Mafia. But Martorano has always denied having any detailed knowledge of his father's business dealings. Judge Hannum's excessive sentence was a part of this pressure.

Prior to Martorano's sentencing, his trial counsel, Robert Simone, was indicted on tax evasion charges. Again, before sentence was imposed in the Martorano case, Judge Hannum testified as a character witness for Simone. An article appeared in the Philadelphia Daily News criticizing the judge and called his testimony "highly unusual". Martorano stated in subsequent appeals that Judge Hannum should have recused himself from his case prior to imposing sentence.

=== Life in prison ===
Martorano holds the title of longest-serving, first-time, non-violent offender in federal custody. He claims the sentencing judge gave the unprecedented term to pressure him to inform on his father and other mob bosses.

Martorano distinguished himself during his time in federal prison. In addition to being a "model" prisoner, Martorano:

- prevented the hijacking of an aircraft by prisoners while in transit from Philadelphia to Oklahoma following the loss of his 33rd appeal. This incident has been documented by the FBI and Federal Bureau of Prisons (FBOP) and was called "extraordinary" by D.C. DeCamilla, SIS lieutenant
- was considered one of the most prolific writers in the Federal Prison System, having authored more than 31 books. He has also written numerous short stories, screenplays and poems
- published a self-help booklet for inmates entitled the ShotCaller. This publication has been approved by the FBOP for use in prisoner re-entry programs
- has developed a creative writing course - "The Write to Life" - which has assisted numerous inmates in earning GEDs and developing creative writing skills.
- is a certified suicide watch counselor. He often uses himself as an example in this role, telling fellow inmates: "If I have hope facing what I am facing every day, so can you."

=== Appeals ===
Martorano appealed his original sentence in 1987 and appeared again before Judge Hannum, receiving the same sentence. Subsequently, Martorano filed over 35 appeals. All the presiding judges upheld the original sentence.

=== Release ===
Martorano was released from United States Penitentiary, Coleman, Florida, on October 5, 2015, on a compassionate release order.
