= The Channels =

American doo wop group

- Origin: New York City, U.S.
- Genres: Doo-wop; R&B; Rock and roll
- Years active: 1955–1958,1959-1960, Mid-1960s,1970-2011
- Labels: Gone Records; Fury Records; Port Records; Hit Records; Enjoy Records; Groove Records
- Past members: Larry Hampden; Billy Morris; Edward Dolphin; Earl Michael Lewis; Clifton Wright; John Felix; Henry Fernandez; Salahuddin Aziz; Jack Brown; Luther Hudson; Joe Rivera; Bernard Jones; Stuart Morgan; Joe Odom; Wesley Neil; Cecil Wiley; Ron Coleman

The Channels were an American doo wop group from New York City.

== History ==
An R&B/soul group of the 1950s, The Channels formed in 1955 around the singers Larry Hampden, Billy Morris, and Edward Dolphin, "Joe"(Bass) and "Rico"(Lead). But soon after Joe and Rico Departed, with Earl Michael Lewis and Clifton Wright formerly of The Lotharios replacing them. Lewis was the group's main songwriter.

Clifton Wright left after they recorded "That's My Desire", so "Altar of Love" features the other four.

The group disbanded In 1958

The Channels recorded for record labels Gone, Fury, Port, Hit, Enjoy, and Groove. The lineup changed several times over the course of the group's lifetime. They enjoyed significant regional success on the East Coast but never charted a major nationwide hit.

Other notable (though not nationally charted) singles include "Bye Bye Baby" b/w "My Love Will Never Die," "That's My Desire," "The Gleam in Your Eye," "Anything You Do," and "You Can Count On Me."

Original Baritone Edward Dolphin died on July 10, 1981 (According to his son David, and social security).

Jack Brown(Who Joined In 1970, Left In 1975 and Rejoined In 1988) died on January 20, 2013.

Original 1st Tenor Lawrence "Larry" Hampden died on June 2, 2020.

== Legacy ==
"The Closer You Are" was included in Robert Christgau's "Basic Record Library" of 1950s and 1960s recordings, published in Christgau's Record Guide: Rock Albums of the Seventies (1981).

Frank Zappa recorded "The Closer You Are" on his album Them or Us (1984).

== Discography ==
=== Singles ===
| Year | Single | U.S. label |
|---|---|---|
| 1956 | "The Closer You Are / Now You Know" | Whirlin 100 / Port 70014 |
| 1956 | "The Gleam In Your Eye / Stars In The Sky" | Whirlin 102 / Port 70017 |
| 1957 | "I Really Love You / What Do You Do" | Whirlin 107 / Port 70023 |
| 1957 | "Flames In My Heart / My Lovin' Baby" | Whirlin 109 / Port 70022 |
| 1957 | "Stay As You Are / That's My Desire" | Gone 5012 |
| 1957 | "All Alone / Altar Of Love" | Gone 5019 |
| 1957 | "Bye, Bye Baby / My Love Will Never Die" | Fury 1021/1071 |
| 1959 | "The Girl Next Door / My Heart Is Sad" | Fire 1001 |
| 1963 | "In My Arms To Stay / You Hurt Me (Over Again)" | Hit 700 |
