= Raymond Martorano =

Soldier in the Philadelphia Mafia

- Born: March 27, 1927; Sicily, Italy
- Died: February 5, 2002 (aged 74); Philadelphia, Pennsylvania, U.S.
- Cause of death: Several gunshot wounds
- Other name: Long John
- Occupations: Vending machine company owner Soldier in the Philadelphia Crime Family
- Spouse: Evelyn Martorano
- Children: George Martorano, Roxanne Greenstone
- Relatives: Evelyn Greenstone, Max Greenstone (grandchildren)

Raymond "Long John" Martorano (born Ignazio Raimondo Antonino Martorano; March 27, 1927 - February 5, 2002) was an Italian-American mobster who was a made man and soldato in the Italian-American Philadelphia Crime Family. He is notable for his role in the methamphetamines trade, as well as his relations with several notable members of the city's underworld. He was also a valuable asset to the Philadelphia Italian-American Mafia due to his earning capacity and his connections with the K&A Gang (through John Berkery), Chelsais Bouras and the Philadelphia Greek Mob, the Pagans MC, the Warlocks MC, and the Junior Black Mafia.

== Early criminal career ==
In his early 20s Martorano had relocated from his native Sicily to Philadelphia. Between 1950 and 1955 he was convicted five times for illegal narcotics or liquor dealing. His sentences began as probation and grew to five years in prison.

In the 1960s and 1970s Martorano became associated with Angelo Bruno the boss of the Philadelphia crime family. In the late 1970s Martorano became one of the most successful methamphetamine dealers in the city. The dealing of drugs was supposed to be taboo in the organization, but it was obvious the "Docile Don" had turned a blind eye on the Martorano operation. While Bruno was receiving a cut of the drug profits he was also an employee of the Martorano brothers’ – Raymond and John – vending machine business. This was the mob boss’ legitimate job – a commissioned salesman for the company – for which he earned $50,000 a year. Angelo Bruno's reign marked a period of underworld calm in Philadelphia. His murder in March 1980 allowed the gloves to come off and inaugurated a period of gangland bloodshed that lasted more than two decades, mostly during the reign of Nicodemo "Little Nicky" Scarfo.

== Involvement in Mafia hits ==
In the wake of Angelo Bruno's death, and Nicky Scarfo's ascension to boss of the Philadelphia crime family Martorano, who was not a made member under Bruno, earned his button in the Scarfo Family by planning the December 16, 1980 murder of union leader John McCullough. Martorano and his brother-in-law Albert Daidone, a union organizer, hired Willard Moran, described as a low-level South Jersey racketeer, to murder McCullough.

In May 1981, at the Meletis Greek restaurant in South Philadelphia, Bouras was gunned down alongside his girlfriend Janette Curro, Ray Martorano, and Philadelphia radio personality Jerry Blavat.

By April 27, 1981, Martorano was on hand for the killing of Chelsais "Stevie" Bouras. The leader of a Greek-American gang, Bouras was dining with friends, including Martorano. Suddenly a gunman appeared at the table, motioned Martorano and others to move aside then began blasting. Tragically the shooting took the life of Bouras's girlfriend, Janette Curro. Bouras was 50 and Curro was 54. Martorano and Blavat were wounded.

By the following April Philip Testa was dead and Scarfo was the recognized leader of the family – recognized by everyone except former Bruno loyalist Harry "the Hunchback" Riccobene. After several failed attempts at bringing Harry under control by killing him, Scarfo sent Martorano and Frank Monte, the family consigliere, to speak to Mario "Sonny" Riccobene, Harry's half-brother.

Martorano and Monte asked Riccobene to set up Harry for a kill. Sonny promised to get back to them. The failed attempt to get Sonny Riccobene to "serve up Harry" marked the beginning of the Riccobene/Scarfo War.

== Arrest and imprisonment ==
In 1982 Martorano was indicted for his drug operation but managed to make bail. Whilst out on bail, he met with members of the Pagans Motorcycle club and informed them of a street tax being imposed on them by his boss Nicky Scarfo. Enraged by the tax, the Pagans kidnapped Martorano's son George and strapped him with a vest full of dynamite. Long John reportedly paid them $10,000 up front for the release of his son and promised to have the street tax removed.

In May 1982, he was convicted and sentenced to ten years. While in prison he had other problems however. In 1983 the authorities arrested Willard Moran and charged him with the McCullough murder. Anastasia wrote, "Poor planning and idle chatter" led to his capture. Moran would be the first in a "long line" of Scarfo Family members and associates to become government witnesses. Sentenced to die in the Pennsylvania electric chair, Moran flipped and ratted out Martorano and Daidone to save himself. In 1984 Moran was the key witness for the prosecution against the two men. Martorano and Daidone were found guilty and sentenced to life in prison.

In October 1986 Nick Caramandi was arrested by the FBI on extortion charges. He was placed in the Philadelphia Detention Center, which housed Martorano and his son, George "Cowboy" Martorano. The younger Martorano had built a drug empire believed to be worth $75 million before he was convicted in 1984. Under what was called "the Federal drug king pin statute" he was sentenced to life in prison.

Caramandi, feeling like he was about to be hung out to dry by Scarfo, went and talked to "Long John" about his situation. A few days later Martorano got back to Caramandi and they talked in the prison yard.

== Release from prison and death ==
On November 12, 1999, Raymond "Long John" Martorano was released from prison after spending more than 17 years behind bars. Once he was released from prison, he began planning ways to take over lucrative gambling operations. Unfortunately for Martorano, these operations were controlled by Joseph "Uncle Joe" Ligambi. Ligambi, the acting boss of the Philadelphia crime family, had a solid support network in his soldiers.

On January 17, 2002, while driving his Lincoln Town Car along the 700 block of Spruce Street in the Washington Square West section of Philadelphia, Martorano was shot and critically wounded by an unknown gunman or gunmen. He succumbed to his injuries on February 5, 2002.
